= List of Chinese painters =

This is a list of Chinese painters:

pinyin	Wade-Giles	Traditional Chinese name	Simplified Chinese name	Dates	Notes
An Zhengwen	An Cheng-wen	安正文	安正文	Ming dynasty	
Biān Jǐngzhāo	Pien Ching-chao	邊景昭	边景昭	Ming dynasty	
Biān Shòumín	Pien Shou-min	邊壽民	边寿民	1684–1752	
Cai Han	Ts'ai Han	蔡含	蔡含	1647–1686	
Cai Jin	Ts'ai Jin	蔡锦	蔡錦	1965–	
Cao Buxing	Ts'ao Pu-hsing	曹不興	曹不兴	3rd century	
Cáo Xuěqín	Ts'ao Hsueh-ch'in	曹雪芹	曹雪芹	1715–1763	also a writer
Cao Zhibai	Ts'ao Chih-pai	曹知白	曹知白	1272–1355	
Chai Jingyi	Ch'ai Ching-yi	柴靜儀	柴静仪	1639-1690	Most famous as a poet.
Chan Shing Kau	N/A	陳成球	陳成球	1952-	Ink painting
Chang Shuhong	Ch'ang Shu-hung	常書鴻	常书鸿	1904–1994	
Chen Peiqiu	Ch'en P'ei-ch'iu	陳佩秋	陈佩秋	1922–2020	Wife of Xie Zhiliu.
Chén Chún	Ch'en Ch'un	陳淳	陈淳	1483–1544	
Chen Hong	Ch'en Hung	陳閎	陈闳	Tang dynasty	
Chén Hóngshòu	Ch'en Hung-shou	陳洪綬	陈洪绶	1598–1652	
Chén Jìrú	Ch'en Chi-ju	陳繼儒	陈继儒	1558–1639	
Chen Lin	Ch'en Lin	陳琳	陈琳	Yuan dynasty	
Chen Lu	Ch'en Lu	陳錄	陈录	Ming dynasty	
Chén Róng	Ch'en Jung	陳榮	陈荣	1235–1262	
Chen Shu	Ch'en Shu	陳書	陈书	1660-1735	
Chen Yifei	Ch'en I-fei	陳逸飛	陈逸飞	1946–2005	also a fashion designer and film director; brother Chen Yiming
Cheng Jiasui	Ch'eng Chia-sui	程嘉燧	程嘉燧	1565–1643	
Cheng Shifa	Ch'eng Shih-fa	程十髮	程十发	1921–2007	
Chéng Zhèngkuí	Ch'eng Cheng-k'ui	程正揆	程正揆	1604–1670	
Chéng Suì	Ch'eng Sui	程邃	程邃	1605–1691	
Cuī Zǐzhōng	Ts'ui Tzu-chung	崔子忠	崔子忠	?–1644	(Chinese)
Cuī Bái	Tsui Po	崔白	崔白	Song dynasty	
Dài Jìn	Tai Chin	戴進	戴进	1388–1462	
Dai Xi	Tai Hsi	戴熙	戴熙	1801–1860	
Dèng Shírú	Teng Shih-ju	鄧石如	邓石如	Qing dynasty	
Dīng Guānpéng	Ting Kuan-p'eng	丁觀鵬	丁观鹏	Qing dynasty	
Ding Yunpeng	Ting Yün-p'eng	丁云鵬	丁云鹏	1547–1628	
Dǒng Qíchāng	Tung Ch'i-ch'ang	董其昌	董其昌	1555–1636	
Dǒng Yúan	Tung Yüan	董源	董源	934–962	
Du Jin	Tu Chin	杜堇	杜堇	Ming dynasty	
Du Qiong	Tu Ch'iung	杜瓊	杜琼	1396–1474	
Fàn Kuān	Fan K'uan	范寬	范宽	Song dynasty	
Fan Qi	Fan Ch'i	樊圻	樊圻	Qing dynasty	
Fan Tchunpi	Fang Ch'un-pi	方君璧		1898-1986	Names also rendered as Fang Junbi.
Fāng Cóngyì	Fang Ts'ung-i	方從義	方从义	Yuan dynasty	
Fang Ganmin	Fang Kan Min	方幹民	方干民	1906–1984	
Fei Danxu	Fei Tan-hsü	費丹旭	费丹旭	Qing dynasty	
Fù Bàoshí	Fu Pao-shih	傅抱石	傅抱石	1904–1965	grandfather of Jenny Pat
Gai Qi	Kai Ch'i	改琦	改琦	1774–1829	
Gao Cen	Kao Ts'en	高岑	高岑	Qing dynasty	
Gāo Fènghàn	Kao Feng-han	高鳳翰	高凤翰	1683–1749	
Gāo Kègōng	Kao K'o-kung	高克恭	高克恭	1248–1310	
Gāo Qípeì	Kao Ch'i-p'ei	高其佩	高其佩	1660–1734	
Gao Xiang	Kao Hsiang	高翔	高翔	1688–1753	
A Ge	Ā Gē	阿鸽		1948–	
Gong Kai	Kung K'ai	龔開	龚开	1222–1307	
Gōng Xián	Kung Hsien	龔賢	龚贤	1618–1689	
Gù Ān	Ku An	顧安	顾安	1289–?	
Gù Hóngzhōng	Ku Hung-chung	顧閎中	顾闳中	c. 937 – c. 975	
Gù Kǎizhī	Ku K'ai-chih	顧愷之	顾恺之	c. 345 – c. 406	
Gu Zhengyi	Ku Cheng-i	顧正誼	顾正谊	Ming dynasty	
Guan Daosheng	Kuan Tao-sheng	管道升	管道升	Yuan dynasty	
Guo Chun	Kuo Ch'un	郭純	郭纯	1370–1444	
Guan Tong	Kuan T'ung	關仝	关仝	906–960	
Guān Zǐlán	Kuan Tzu-lan	關紫蘭	關紫蘭	1903–1986	Fauvist painter. Also known as Violet Kwan.
Guō Xī	Kuo Hsi	郭熙	郭熙	1020–1090	
Guo Zhongshu	Kuo Chung-shu	郭忠恕	郭忠恕	?–977	
Hán Gàn	Han Kan	韓幹	韩干	706–783	
Hong Ren	Hung Jen	弘仁	弘仁	1610–1664	Buddhist monk
Hú Jiéqīng	Hu Chieh-ch'ing	胡絜青	胡絜青	1905–2001	
Hu Zao	Hu Tsao	胡慥	胡慥	Qing dynasty	
Hu Zaobin	Wu Cho-Bun	胡藻斌	胡藻斌	1897–1942	
Hua Yan	Hua Yen	華喦	华岩	Qing dynasty	
Huáng Bīnhóng	Huang Pin-hung	黃賓虹	黄宾虹	1864–1955	
Huang Ding	Huang Ting	黃鼎	黄鼎	Qing dynasty	
Huáng Gōngwàng	Huang Kung-wang	黃公望	黄公望	1269–1354	
Huang Ji	Huang Chi	黃濟	黄济	Ming dynasty	
Huáng Shèn	Huang Shen	黃慎	黄慎	1687–1772	
Ji Sheng	Chi Sheng	計盛	计盛	Ming dynasty	
Jiǎng Tíngxí	Chiang T'ing-hsi	蔣廷錫	蒋廷锡	1669–1732	
Jiāo Bǐngzhēn	Chiao Ping-chen	焦秉貞	焦秉贞	1689–1726	, , ,
Jin Nong	Chin N'ung	金農	金农	1687–1764	
Jīn Tíngbiāo	Chin T'ing-piao	金廷標	金廷标	Qing dynasty	
Jing Hao	Ching Hao			855–915	
Jizi	Wang Yunshan	姬子	姬子	1942–2015	
Jū Cháo	Chü Ch'ao	居巢	居巢	1811–1865	
Ju Lian	Chü Lien	居廉	居廉	1828–1904	
Junye Song	Chün-Yeh Sung	宋駿業	宋駿業	18th century	
Juran	Chü-jan	巨然	巨然	10th century	
Ke Jiusi	K'o Chiu-ssu	柯九思	柯九思	1290–1343	noted for his poetry
Kūn Cán	K'un Ts'an	髡殘	髡残	Qing dynasty	Buddhist monk
Lam Wai Kit		林慧潔		1966-	
Lán Yīng	Lan Ying	藍瑛	蓝瑛	1585–1664	
Lěng Mèi	Leng Mei	冷枚	冷枚	Qing dynasty	
Lǐ Chéng	Li Ch'eng	李成	李成	919–967	
Li Daoxi	Li Daoxi	李道熙	李道熙	1920-2007	
Li Di	Li Ti	李迪	李迪	ca. 1100 – after 1197	
Lǐ Fāngyīng	Li Fang-ying	李方膺	李方膺	1695–1755	
Li Gonglin	Li Gong-lin	李公麟	李公麟	1049–1106	
Li Gongnian	Li Gong-nian	李公年		early 12th century, Song dynasty	links > ;
Lǐ Kàn	Li K'an	李衎	李衎	1244–1320	
Li Keran	Li K'e-jan	李可染	李可染	1907–1989	father of Li Xiaoke
Li Rongjin	Li Jung-chin	李容瑾	李容瑾	Yuan dynasty	
Lǐ Shàn	Li Shan	李鱓	李鳝	1686? – c. 1762	
Li Shida	Li Shih-ta	李士達	李士达	Ming dynasty	
Li Shixing	Li Shih-hsing	李士行	李士行	1282–1328	
Li Shuang	Li Shuang		李爽	1957-	
Li Song	Li Sung	李嵩	李嵩	active 1190–1230	
Lǐ Táng	Li T'ang	李唐	李唐	1047–1127	
Li Tiefu	Li T'ieh fu	李鐵夫	李铁夫	1869–1952	
Li Yanshan	Li Yen-shan	李研山	李研山	1898–1961	
Li Yin	Li Yin	李因	李因	c.1610-1685	
Li Zai	Li Tsai	李在	李在	?–1431	
Li Zemin	Li Tse-min	李澤民	李泽民	Yuan Dynasty	
Liáng Kǎi	Liang K'ai	梁楷	梁楷	Southern Song dynasty	
Liáng Xuěqīng		梁学庆		1890–?, active 1930s	sister to Liang Dingming (梁鼎铭), Liang Youming (梁又铭), and Liang Zhongming (梁中铭)
Lín Liáng	Lin Liang	林良	林良	1416–1480	
Lin Tinggui	Lin T'ing-kuei	林庭珪	林庭珪	Southern Song dynasty	
Lin Xue	Lin Hsueh	林雪		Ming dynasty	Courtesy name Lin Tiansu {林天素}.
Liú Chāngmíng	Liu Ch'ang-ming	劉昌明	刘昌明	1952–	
Liu Haisu	Liu Hai-su	劉海粟	刘海粟	1896–1994	
Liú Zhèngxìng		刘正兴	刘正兴	1952-	
Liu Jue	Liu Chüeh	劉玨	刘珏	1409–1472	
Liu Jun	Liu Chün	劉俊	刘俊	Ming dynasty	
Liu Rushi	Liu Ju-shih	柳如是	柳如是	1618-1664	One of the Eight Beauties of Qinhuai.
Lou Zhenggang			婁正綱	1966–	
Lǚ Jì	Lü Chi	呂紀	吕纪	1477–?	
Lu Guang	Lu Kuang	陸廣	陆广	Yuan dynasty	
Lù Zhì	Lu Chih	陸治	陆治	Ming dynasty	
Luó Mù	Lo Mu	羅牧	罗牧	1622–?	
Luó Pìn	Lo P'in	羅聘	罗聘	1733–1799	
Luo Zhichuan	Lo Chih-ch'uan	羅稚川	罗稚川	Yuan dynasty	
Ma Lin	Ma Lin	馬麟	马麟	Song dynasty	
Ma Quan	Ma Ch'üan	馬荃	马荃	17th century	courtesy name Jiangxiang
Ma Shi	Ma Shih	馬軾	马轼	Ming dynasty	
Ma Shouzhen	Ma Shou-chen	馬守真		c.1548-1604	Courtesy name Ma Xianglan (馬湘蘭); one of the Eight Beauties of Qinhuai.
Mǎ Wǎn	Ma Wan	馬琬	马琬	Yuan dynasty	
Ma Yuan	Ma Yüan	馬遠	马远	Song dynasty	father of Ma Quan
Ma Yuanyu	Ma Yüan-yü	馬元馭	马元驭	Qing dynasty	
Méi Qīng	Mei Ch'ing	梅清	梅清	Qing dynasty	
Mi Fu	Mi Fu	米芾	米芾	1051–1107 Song dynasty	painter, poet, calligrapher
Miao Fu	Miao Fu	繆輔	缪辅	Ming dynasty	
Min Zhen	Min Chen	閔貞	闵贞	Qing dynasty	
Mok Hing Ling	Mò Qìng Líng	莫慶靈	莫庆灵	?–contemporary	
Mu Qi	Mu Ch'i	牧谿	牧谿	Southern Song dynasty	
Ni Duan	Ni Tuan	倪端	倪端	1436–1505	
Ni Tian	Ni T'ien	倪田	倪田	1855–1919	
Ní Yuánlù	Ni Yüan-lu	倪元璐	倪元璐	1593–1644	
Ní Zàn	Ni Tsan	倪瓚	倪瓒	1301–1374	
Nie Ou	Nieh Ou	聶鷗	聂鸥	1948-	
Pán Tiānshòu	P'an T'ien-shou	潘天壽	潘天寿	1897–1971	
Pú Huá	P'u Hua	蒲華	蒲华	Qing dynasty	
Pǔ Rú	P'u Ru	溥儒	溥儒	1896–1963	Also known as Pu Xinyu
Qí Báishí	Ch'i Pai-shih	齊白石	齐白石	1863–1957	
Qian Du	Ch'ien Tu	錢杜	钱杜	Qing dynasty	
Qian Gu	Ch'ien Ku	錢谷	钱谷	1508–?	
Qián Xuǎn	Ch'ien Hsüan	錢選	钱选	1235–1305	
Qiú Yīng	Ch'iu Ying	仇英	仇英	2Ming dynasty	
Qiu Zhu	Ch'iu Chu	仇珠		Ming dynasty	Daughter of Qiú Yīng.
Qu Ding	Ch'ü Ting	屈鼎	屈鼎	Song dynasty	
Rén Rénfā	Jen Jen-fa	任仁發	任仁发	1254–1327	
Rén Xióng	Jen Hsiung	任熊	任熊	1823–1857	brother of Ren Yi
Rén Xūn	Jen Hsün	任薰	任薰	1835–1893	
Rén Yí	Jen I	任頤	任颐	1840–1896	brother of Ren Xiong
Shang Xi	Shang Hsi	商喜	商喜	ca. 1430–1440	
Shao Mi	Shao Mi	邵彌	邵弥	1592–1642	Buddhist monk
Shěn Quán	Shen Ch'üan	沈銓	沈铨	1682–1760	
Shen Shichong	Shen Shih-ch'ung	沈士充	沈士充	Ming dynasty	
Shěn Zhōu	Shen Chou	沈周	沈周	1427–1509	teacher of Wen Zhengming
Shèng Mào	Sheng Mao	盛懋	盛懋	Yuan dynasty	
Sheng Maoye	Sheng Mao-yeh	盛茂燁	盛茂烨	Ming dynasty	
Shi Rui	Shih Jui	石銳	石锐	Ming dynasty	
Shí Tāo	Shih T'ao	石濤	石涛	1642–1707	
Song Maojin	Sung Mao-chin	宋懋晉	宋懋晋	Ming dynasty	
Song Xu	Sung Hsü	宋旭	宋旭	Ming dynasty	
Sū Shì	Su Shi	蘇軾	苏轼	1037–1101	famous poet, painter, calligrapher and politician
Sun Duoci	Sun To-tz'u	孫多慈	孙多慈	1912-1975	
Sun Junze	Sun Chün-tse	孫君澤	孙君泽	Yuan dynasty	
Sūn Kèhóng	Sun K'o-hung	孫克弘	孙克弘	1533–1611	
Sūn Lóng	Sun Lung	孫隆	孙隆	Ming dynasty	
Tang Di	T'ang Ti	唐棣	唐棣	Yuan dynasty	
Tang Yifen	T'ang I-fen	湯貽汾	汤贻汾	Qing dynasty	
Táng Yín	T'ang Yin	唐寅	唐寅	1470–1523	Zi name is Bohu
Tseng Yu-ho	N/A	曾佑和		1924-2017	Also known as Betty Ecke.
Wáng Duó	Wang Tuo	王鐸	王铎	1592–1652	calligrapher
Wang E	Wang O	王諤	王谔	Yuan dynasty	
Wáng Fú	Wang Fu	王紱	王绂	1362–1416	
Wang Guxiang	Wang Ku-hsiang	王谷祥	王谷祥	1501–1568	
Wang Hui	Wang Hui	王翬	王翚	Qing dynasty	
Wáng Jiàn	Wang Jian	王鑒	王鉴	1598–1677	
Wáng Jiǔjiāng	Wang Jiujiang	王久江	王久江	1957–	
Wáng Lǚ	Wang Lü	王履	王履	1332–?	
Wáng Miǎn	Wang Mien	王冕	王冕	1287–1359	
Wáng Méng	Wang Meng	王蒙	王蒙	1308–1385	
Wang Qiucen	Wáng Ch'iu-ts'en	王秋岑	王秋岑	1912–1993	
Wáng Shímǐn	Wang Shih-min	王時敏	王时敏	1592–1680	
Wang Shishen	Wang Shih-sen	汪士慎	汪士慎	Qing dynasty	
Wáng Wéi	Wang Wei	王維	王维	701–761	
Wáng Wǔ	Wang Wu	王武	王武	1632–1690	
Wang Yi	Wang I	王繹	王绎	1330–?	
Wáng Yíguāng	Wang Yiguang		王沂光		
Wang Yuan	Wang Yüan	王淵	王渊	Yuan dynasty	
Wang Yuanqi	Wang Yüan-ch'i	王原祁	王原祁	Qing dynasty	
Wáng Xīmèng	Wang Hsi-meng	王希孟	王希孟	?–1120?	
Wáng Zhènpéng	Wang Chen-p'eng	王振鵬	王振鹏	Yuan dynasty	
Wang Zhongyu	Wang Chung-yü	王仲玉	王仲玉	Ming dynasty	
Wén Bórén	Wen Po-jen	文伯仁	文伯仁	1502–1575	
Wēn Guó Liáng	Wen Guo Liang	溫國良	温国良	1942–	Professor and Academician – China Cultural Ambassador – Master of meticulous painting. From Jilin, lives in Beijing. UNESCO exhibition winner. Ref: 温国良（中国吉林籍艺术家）_百度百科 (baidu.com)
Wen Jia	Wen Chia	文嘉	文嘉	1501–1583	
Wen Shu	Wen Chou	文俶	文俶	1595–1634	Great-granddaughter of Wén Zhēngmíng.
Wén Tóng	Wen T'ung	文同	文同	1018–1079	style name Yuke (与可)
Wén Zhēngmíng	Wen Cheng-ming	文徵明	文徵明	1470–1559	, ; father of Wen Jia
Weng Zhanqiu	Weng Chan-ch’iu	翁佔秋	翁占秋	1900–1945	popularly known as Ong Schan Tchow alias Yung Len Kwui (翁联桂)
Wú Bīn	Wu Pin	吳彬	吴彬	Ming dynasty	
Wú Chāngshuò	Wu Ch'ang-shuo	吳昌碩	吴昌硕	1844–1927	
Wu Daozi	Wu Tao-tzu	吳道子	吴道子	710–780	
Wú Dàoxuán	Wu Tao-hsan	吳道玄	吴道玄	685–758	
Wu Guanzhong	Wu Kuan-chung	吳冠中	吴冠中	1919–2010	
Wú Hóng	Wu Hung	吳宏	吴宏	Qing dynasty	
Wú Lì	Wu Li	吳歷	吴历	1632–1718	
Wu Shixian	Wu Shih-hsien	吳石仙	吴石仙	Qing dynasty	
Evan Siu Ping Wu	Wu Hsiao-ping	胡小萍			
Wu Wei	Wu Wei	吳偉	吴伟	1459–1508	
Wú Zhèn	Wu Chen	吳鎮	吴镇	1280–1354	
Wuzhun Shifan	Wu Chun Shih Fan	無準師範	无準师範	1178–1249	
Wú Zhēngyàn	Wu Cheng Yen	吳爭豔	吴争艳	1980-	
Wú Zuòrén	Wu Tso-jen	吳作人	吴作人	1908–1997	
Xi Gang	Hsi Kang	奚岡	奚冈	Qing dynasty	
Xià Chǎng	Hsia Ch'ang	夏昶	夏昶	1388–1470	
Xia Gui	Hsia Kui	夏圭	夏圭	Song dynasty	
Xia Shuwen	Hsia Shu-wen	夏叔文	夏叔文	Ming dynasty	
Xia Yong	Hsia Yung	夏永	夏永	Yuan dynasty	
Xiàng Shèngmó	Hsiang Sheng-mo	項聖謨	项圣谟	1597–1658	
Xiāo Yúncóng	Hsiao Yün-ts'ung	蕭雲從	萧云从	1596–1673	
Xiao Zhao	Hsiao Chao	-	-	active 1130–1162	
Xie Huan	Hsieh Huan	謝環	谢环	(c. 1370–1450)	
Xie Shichen	Hsieh Shih-ch'en	謝時臣	谢时臣	1488–?	
Xie Sun	Hsieh Sun	謝蓀	谢荪	Qing dynasty	
Xie Zhiliu	Hsieh Chih-liu	謝稚柳	谢稚柳	1910–1997	husband of Chen Peiqiu
Xu Beihong	Hsü Pei-hung	徐悲鴻	徐悲鸿	1895–1953	
Xu Daoning	Hsü Tao-ning	許道寧	许道宁	Song dynasty	
Xū Gǔ	Hsü Ku	虛谷	虚谷	Qing dynasty	
Xú Wèi	Hsü Wei	徐渭	徐渭	1521–1593	
Xú Xī	Hsü Hsi	徐熙	徐熙	937–975	
Xue Susu	Hsueh Su-su	薛素素	薛素素	Ming dynasty	
Yan Hui	Yen Hui	顏輝	颜辉	Yuan dynasty	
Yan Li	Yen Li	嚴力	严力	1954–2026	Poet and painter.
Yan Zong	Yán zōng	颜宗	颜宗	1393-1459	
Yan Wenliang	Yen Wen Liang	顏文樑	颜文梁	1893–1988	
Yán Lìběn	Yen Li-pen	閻立本	阎立本	?-–673	
Yang Borun	Yang Pojun	楊伯潤	杨伯润	Qing dynasty	
Yang Jin	Yang Chin	楊晉	杨晋	Qing dynasty	
Yáng Wéizhēn	Yang Wei-chen	楊維楨	杨维桢	1296–1370	
Yao Tingmei	Yao T'ing-mei	姚廷美	姚廷美	Yuan dynasty	
Yè Xīn	Yeh Hsin	葉欣	叶欣	Qing dynasty	
Yì Yuánjí	I Yüan-chi	易元吉	易元吉	(ca. 1000 – ca. 1064)	known for his paintings of monkeys
Yin Zhaohui				1977-	ambiguous scenes of the human form
Yuan Jiang	Yüan Chiang	袁江	袁江	Qing dynasty	
Yuan Yao	Yüan Yao	袁耀	袁耀	Qing dynasty	
Yun Bing	Yün Ping	惲冰	恽冰	17th century	courtesy names Qingyu and Haoru
Yun Shouping	Yün Shou-p'ing	惲壽平	恽寿平	1633–1690	Father of Yun Bing
Yu Zhiding	Yü Chih-ting	禹之鼎	禹之鼎	1647–1716	
Zeng Jing	Tseng Ching	曾鯨	曾鲸	1568–1650	
Zha Shibiao	Cha Shih-piao	查士標	查士标	1615–1698	
Zhǎn Zǐqián	Chan Tzu-ch'ien	展子虔	展子虔	Sui dynasty	
Zhāng Dàqiān	Chang Ta-ch'ien	張大千	张大千	1899–1983	
Zhang Lu	Chang Lu	張風	张路	1464–1538	
Zhang Peng		張鵬	张鹏	1981–	painter and photographer
Zhang Renxi		張人希	张人希	1918–2010	painter, poet and engraver
Zhāng Sēngyáo	Chang Seng-yao	張僧繇	张僧繇	502–557	
Zhang Shengwen	Chang Sheng-wen	張勝溫	张胜温	active 1163–1189	
Zhang Shunzi	Chang Shun-tzu	張舜咨	张舜咨	Yuan dynasty	
Zhāng Shūqí	Chang Shu-ch'i	張書旂	张书旗	1900–1957	
Zhang Wo	Chang Wo	張渥	张渥	Yuan dynasty	
Zhāng Xuān	Chang Hsüan	張萱	张萱	Tang dynasty	
Zhang Yan	Chang Yen	張彥	张彦	Ming dynasty	
Zhang Yin	Chang Yin	張吟	张吟	Qing dynasty	
Zhang Renxi				1918–2010	painter, poet and engraver
Zhāng Zéduān	Chang Tse-tuan	張擇端	张择端	1085–1145 Northern Song dynasty	
Zhang Zongcang	Chang Tsung-ts'ang	張宗蒼	张宗苍	Qing dynasty	
Zhào Jí	Chao Chi	趙佶	赵佶	1082–1135	Also known as Emperor Huizong of Song dynasty
Zhào Mèngfǔ	Chao Meng-fu	趙孟頫	赵孟頫	1254–1322	calligrapher
Zhao Yong	Chao Yung	趙雍	赵雍	Yuan dynasty	
Zhao Yuan	Chao Yüan	趙原	赵原	Yuan dynasty	
Zhào Zhīqiān	Chao Chih-ch'ien	趙之謙	赵之谦	1829–1884	seal carver, calligrapher
Zhao Zuo	Chao Tso	趙左	赵左	Ming dynasty	
Zheng Sixiao	Cheng Ssu-xsiao	鄭思肖	郑思肖	1241–1318	short biography >
Zhèng Xiè	Cheng Hsieh	鄭燮	郑燮	1693–1765	courtesy name Bǎnqiáo 板橋; ext. links: (Chinese),
Zhou Chen	Chou Ch'en	周臣	周臣	Ming dynasty	
Zhōu Fǎng	Chou Fang	周昉	周昉	ca. 730–800	
Zhou Jichang	Chou Chi-ch'ang	周季常	周季常	Song dynasty	
Zhou Shuxi	Chou Shu-hsi	周淑禧	周淑禧	1624–1705	
Zhou Wenjing	Chou Wen-ching	周文靖	周文靖	Ming dynasty	
Zhou Zhimian	Chou Chih-mien	周之冕	周之冕	Ming dynasty	
Zhū Dā	Chu Ta	朱耷	朱耷	1626–1705	also known as Bada Shanren, Buddhist monk
Zhu Derun	Chu Te-jun	朱德潤	朱德润	Yuan dynasty	
Zhu Shijie	Chu Shih Chieh	朱士傑	朱士杰	1900–1990	
Zhu Zhanji	Chu Chan-chi	朱瞻基	朱瞻基	1398–1435	The Xuande Emperor of the Ming dynasty
Zong Bing	Tsung Ping	宗炳	宗炳	375–443	wrote an early text on landscape painting
Zou Yigui	Tsou I-kui	鄒一桂	邹一桂	Qing dynasty	
Zou Zhe	Tsou Che	鄒喆	邹喆	Qing dynasty	

== See also ==
- List of Chinese artists
- Chinese calligraphy
- Chinese painting
- List of calligraphers
- Lists of painters
