= List of painters by name beginning with "L" =

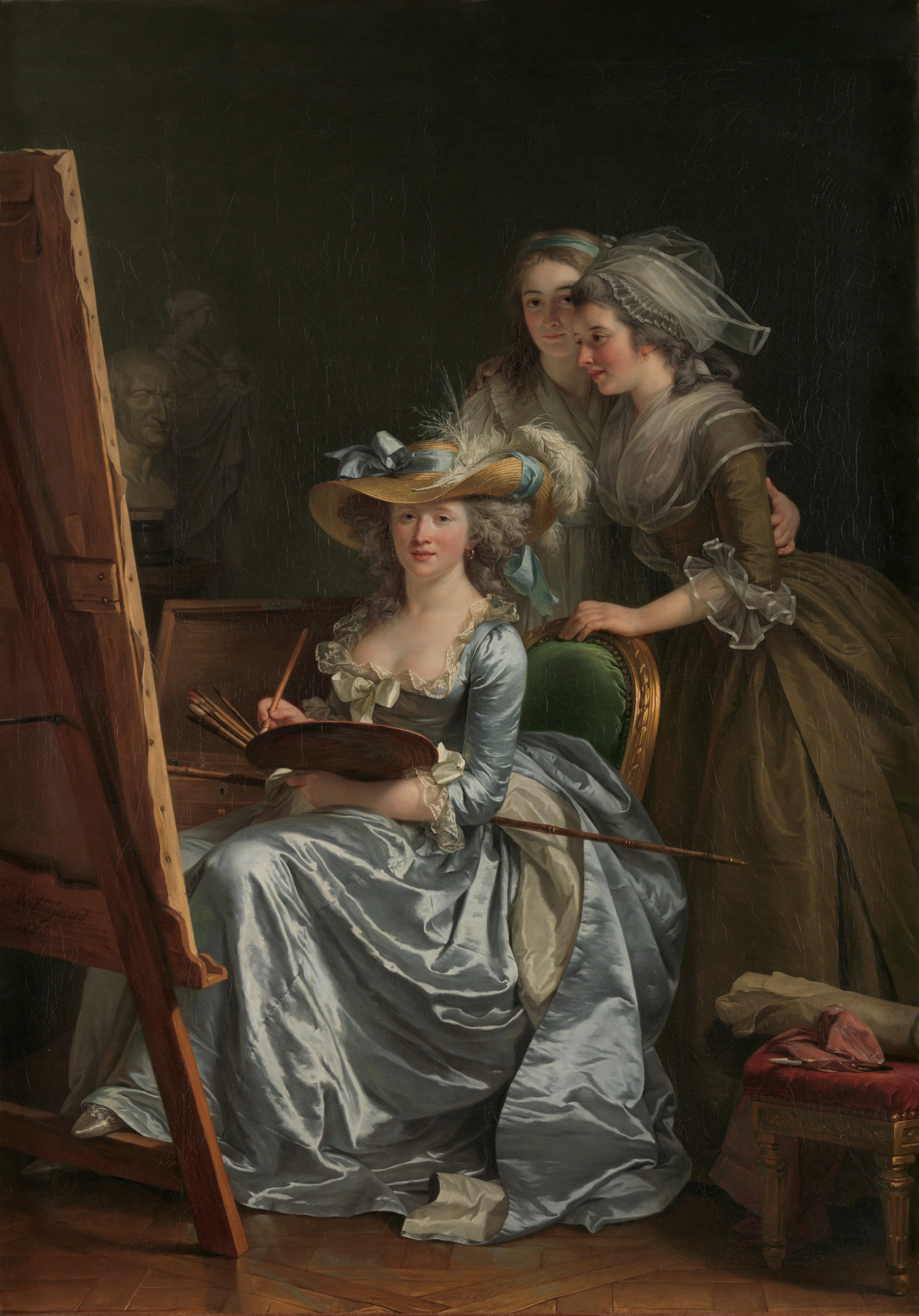
Adélaïde Labille-Guiard

Please add names of notable painters with a Wikipedia page, in precise English alphabetical order, using U.S. spelling conventions. Country and regional names refer to where painters worked for long periods, not to personal allegiances.

- Willem Labeij (1943–2011), Dutch painter
- Adélaïde Labille-Guiard (1749–1803), French miniaturist and painter
- Félix Labisse (1905–1982), French painter, illustrator and designer
- Hugo Laborice (born 1955), Mexican painter
- Georges Lacombe (1868–1916)
- Márta Lacza (born 1946), Hungarian graphic artist and painter
- Pieter van Laer (1599–1642), French sculptor and painter
- Pierre Laffillé (1938–2011), French painter
- Emile Lahner (1893–1980), Hungarian/French painter
- Annie Rose Laing (1869–1946), Scottish painter
- Gerard de Lairesse (1640–1711), Dutch painter and art theorist
- Wifredo Lam (1902–1982), Cuban/French painter
- Henry Lamb (1883–1960), English painter and physician
- George Lambourn (1900–1977), English artist
- Aleksandr Ivanovich Laktionov (1910–1972), Soviet painter
- Lam Qua (林官, 1801–1860), Chinese portrait painter
- Lan Ying (藍瑛, 1585–1664), Chinese painter
- Nicolas Lancret (1690–1743), French painter
- Myra Landau (1926–2018), Romanian/Brazilian painter
- Ronnie Landfield (born 1947), American painter
- Edwin Landseer (1802–1873), English painter and sculptor
- Fitz Hugh Lane (1804–1865), American painter and print-maker
- Giovanni Lanfranco (1582–1647), Italian painter
- Otto Lange (1879–1944), German painter and graphic artist
- Peter Lanyon (1918–1964), English painter
- Mikhail Larionov (1881–1964), Russian/Soviet painter
- Julio Larraz (born 1944), Cuban/American artist
- Carl Larsson (1859–1919), Swedish painter
- Ibram Lassaw (1913–2003), American painter
- Pieter Lastman (1583–1633), Dutch painter
- Philip de László (1869–1937), Hungarian/English painter
- Rainer Maria Latzke (born 1950), German painter
- Georges de La Tour (1593–1652), French painter
- William Langson Lathrop (1859–1938), American painter
- Robert Scott Lauder (1803–1869), Scottish painter
- Marie Laurencin (1883–1956), French painter and print-maker
- Jean-Paul Laurens (1838–1921), French painter and sculptor
- John Lavery (1856–1941), Irish painter
- Andrew Law (1873–1967), Scottish portrait painter
- Edith Lawrence (1890–1973), English painter and textile designer
- Jacob Lawrence (1917–2000), American painter
- Thomas Lawrence (1769–1830), English painter and Royal Academy of Arts president
- Jesús Mari Lazkano (born 1960) Spanish (Basque) painter
- Gregorio Lazzarini (1655–1730), Italian painter
- Charles Le Brun (1619–1690), French painter, physiognomist and art theorist
- Antoine Le Nain (c. 1599 – 1648), French painter
- Louis Le Nain (c. 1601 – 1648), French painter
- Mathieu Le Nain (1607–1677), French painter
- Charles Le Roux (1814–1895), French painter
- Henri Le Sidaner (1862–1939), French painter
- Benjamin Williams Leader (1831–1923), English painter
- Juan de Valdés Leal (1622–1690), Spanish painter and etcher
- Georges Emile Lebacq (1876–1950), Belgian painter
- Mikhail Lebedev (1811–1837), Russian painter
- Lennie Lee (born 1958), South African/English artist
- Jules Joseph Lefebvre (1836–1911), French painter, educator and theorist
- Silvestro Lega (1826–1895), Italian painter
- Fernand Léger (1881–1955), French painter, sculptor and film-maker
- Alphonse Legros (1837–1911), French painter, etcher and sculptor
- Anton Lehmden (1929–2018), Austrian painter, draftsman and print-maker
- Wilhelm Leibl (1844–1900), German painter
- Frederic Leighton (1830–1896), English painter, draftsman and sculptor
- Margaret Leiteritz (1907–1976), German painter
- Peter Lely (1618–1680), Dutch/English painter
- Ulrich Leman (1885–1988), German painter
- Georges Lemmen (1865–1916), Belgian painter
- August Lemmer (born 1862), German artist
- Tamara de Lempicka (1898–1980), Polish/American painter
- Franz von Lenbach (1836–1904), German painter
- Leng Mei (冷枚, fl. 1677–1742), Japanese painter
- Robert Lenkiewicz (1941–2002), English painter
- Achille Leonardi (c. 1800 – 1870), Italian painter
- Leonardo da Vinci (1452–1519), Italian artist and polymath
- Stanislas Lépine (1835–1892), French painter
- Mikhail Yuryevich Lermontov (1814–1841), Russian painter, writer and poet
- Niels Lergaard (1893–1982), Danish painter
- Alfred Leslie (1927–2023), American artist and film-maker
- Hans Leu the Elder (1460–1507), Swiss painter
- Michael Leunig (1945–2024), Australian cartoonist, poet and commentator
- Leo Leuppi (1893–1972), Swiss painter, graphic artist and sculptor
- Emanuel Leutze (1816–1868), American painter
- Jack Levine (1915–2010), American painter, print-maker and satirist
- Isaac Levitan (1860–1900), Russian painter
- Rafail Levitsky (1847–1940), Russian artist
- Dmitry Levitzky (1735–1822), Russian imperial artist
- Bill Lewis (born 1953), English artist, story-teller and poet
- Wyndham Lewis (1884–1957), English writer, painter and critic
- Aertgen van Leyden (1498–1564), Dutch painter, draftsman and stained-glass designer
- Lucas van Leyden (1494–1533), Dutch painter and print-maker
- Alfred Leyman (1856–1933), English painter
- Thyrza Anne Leyshon (1892–1996), Welsh painter of miniatures
- Judith Leyster (1609–1660), Dutch painter
- André Lhote (1885–1962), French painter
- Li Cheng (李成, 919–967), Chinese painter
- Li Di (李迪, c. 1100 – post-1197), Chinese imperial court painter
- Li Fangying (李方膺, 1696–1755), Chinese painter and magistrate
- Li Gonglin (李公麟, 1049–1106), Chinese painter, antiquarian and politician
- Li Kan (李衎, 1245–1320), Chinese painter
- Li Keran (李可染, 1907–1989), Chinese painter and art educator
- Li Mei-shu (李梅樹, 1902–1983), Chinese/Taiwanese painter, sculptor and politician
- Li Rongjin (李容瑾, fl. late 13th or 14th c.), Chinese painter
- Li Shan (李鳝, 1686–1756), Chinese painter
- Li Shida (李士達, fl. 16th c.), Chinese painter
- Li Shixing (李士行, 1282–1328), Chinese painter
- Li Song (李嵩, fl. 1190–1230), Chinese imperial court painter
- Li Tang (李唐, c. 1050–1130), Chinese painter
- Li Zai (李在, died 1341), Chinese painter
- Liang Kai (梁楷, c. 1140 – c. 1210), Chinese painter
- Liao Chi-chun (廖繼春, 1902–1976), Chinese/Taiwanese painter and sculptor
- Roy Lichtenstein (1923–1997), American pop artist
- Max Liebermann (1847–1935), German painter
- Irene Lieblich (1923–2008), Polish/American artist and Holocaust survivor
- Josse Lieferinxe (fl. c. 1493–1503/1508), Netherlandish painter
- Jan Lievens (1607–1674), Dutch painter
- Sándor Liezen-Mayer (1839–1898), Hungarian/German painter and illustrator
- Maxwell Gordon Lightfoot (1886–1911), English painter
- Bruno Liljefors (1860–1939), Swedish artist
- Limbourg brothers (fl. 1385–1416), Dutch/French miniature painters
- Lin Liang (林良, 1424–1500), Chinese imperial painter
- Lin Tinggui (林庭珪, fl. 1174–1189), Chinese painter
- Amalia Lindegren (1814–1891), Swedish artist and painter
- Emil Lindenfeld (1905–1986), Hungarian/American painter
- Arlington Nelson Lindenmuth (1856–1950), American painter
- Allan Linder (born 1966), American painter, sculptor and writer
- Lionel Lindsay (1874–1961), Australian artist
- Carl Walter Liner (1914–1997), Swiss painter, connoisseur and dealer
- Johannes Lingelbach (1622–1674), Dutch painter
- John Linnell (1792–1873), English painter and engraver
- Jean-Étienne Liotard (1702–1789), Swiss painter, connoisseur and dealer
- Filippino Lippi (1457–1504), Italian painter
- Fra Filippo Lippi (c. 1406 – 1469), Italian painter
- Oleg Lipchenko (born 1957), Soviet/Canadian artist and illustrator
- Arthur Lismer (1885–1969), Canadian painter and educator
- Johann Liss (c. 1590 or 1597–1627 or 1631), German painter
- Dirck van der Lisse (1607–1669), Dutch painter
- El Lissitzky (1890–1941), Soviet artist, designer and architect
- Beatrice Ethel Lithiby (1889–1966), English painter
- Stephen Little (born 1954), American artist, scholar and administrator
- Alexander Litovchenko (1835–1890), Russian painter
- Liu Haisu (刘海粟, 1896–1994), Chinese painter and educator
- Liu Jue (劉玨, 1409–1472), Chinese painter, calligrapher and poet
- Liu Jun (刘俊, fl. late 14th c.), Chinese painter
- William Home Lizars (1788–1859), Scottish painter and engraver
- Elizabeth Jane Lloyd (1928–1995), English painter and educator
- Stefan Lochner (c. 1410 – 1451), German painter
- William Mustart Lockhart (1855–1941), Scottish water-colorist
- Dorothy Lockwood (1910–1991), English painter
- Lojze Logar (1944–2014), Yugoslav/Slovenian painter and graphic artist
- Paul Lohse (1902–1988), Swiss painter and graphic artist
- Elfriede Lohse-Wächtler (1899–1940), German painter and Nazi Germany murder victim
- Germán Londoño (born 1961), Colombian painter and sculptor
- Leonard Long (born 1911), Australian painter
- McKendree Long (1888–1976), American painter and Presbyterian minister
- Barbara Longhi (1552–1638), Italian painter
- Pietro Longhi (1702–1785), Italian painter
- Charles-André van Loo (1705–1765), French painter
- Charles-Amédée-Philippe van Loo (1719–1795), French painter
- Jean-Baptiste van Loo (1684–1745), French painter
- Louis-Michel van Loo (1707–1771), French painter
- Cándido López (1840–1902), Argentinian painter and soldier
- Melchior Lorck (1526/1527 – post-1583), Danish/German painter, draftsman and print-maker
- Christian August Lorentzen (1746–1828), Danish painter
- Pietro Lorenzetti (c. 1280 – 1348), Italian painter
- Hew Lorimer (1907–1993), Scottish sculptor
- John Henry Lorimer (1856–1936), Scottish painter
- Lorenzo Lotto (c. 1480 – 1556/1557), Italian painter, draftsman and illustrator
- Károly Lotz (1833–1904) German/Hungarian painter
- Morris Louis (1912–1962), American painter German-Hungarian painter
- Louisa Matthíasdóttir (1917–2000), Icelandic/American painter
- Claude Lorrain (1600–1682), French painter, draftsman and etcher
- L. S. Lowry (1887–1976), English painter and draftsman
- Lu Guang (陆广, late 13th or 14th century), Chinese painter and poet
- Lü Ji (呂紀, born 1477), Chinese painter
- Lu Zhi (陸治, c. 1496–1576), Chinese painter, calligrapher and poet
- Edward George Handel Lucas (1861–1936), Scottish painter
- Edwin G. Lucas (1911–1990), Scottish painter
- Maximilien Luce (1858–1941), French painter, illustrator and engraver
- Lucebert (1924–1994), Dutch artist
- Ștefan Luchian (1868–1917), Romanian painter
- John Luke (1906–1975), Irish painter, sculptor and draftsman
- George Benjamin Luks (1867–1933), American painter, comics artist and illustrator
- Évariste Vital Luminais (1821–1896), French painter
- Juan Luna (1857–1899), Filipino painter, sculptor and activist
- Henning Jakob Henrik Lund (1875–1948), Greenland painter, lyricist and pastor
- J. L. Lund (1777–1867), Danish painter
- Johan Lundbye (1818–1848), Danish painter and graphic artist
- Vilhelm Lundstrøm (1893–1950), Danish painter
- Luo Mu (1622–1706), Chinese painter, poet and writer
- Luo Ping (羅聘, 1733–1799), Chinese painter
- Luo Zhichuan (羅稚川, fl. 14th century), Chinese painter
- Oskar Lüthy (1882–1945), Swiss painter
- Laura Muntz Lyall (1860–1930), Canadian painter
- Genevieve Springston Lynch (1891–1960), American painter and art teacher
