= List of painters by name beginning with "Z" =

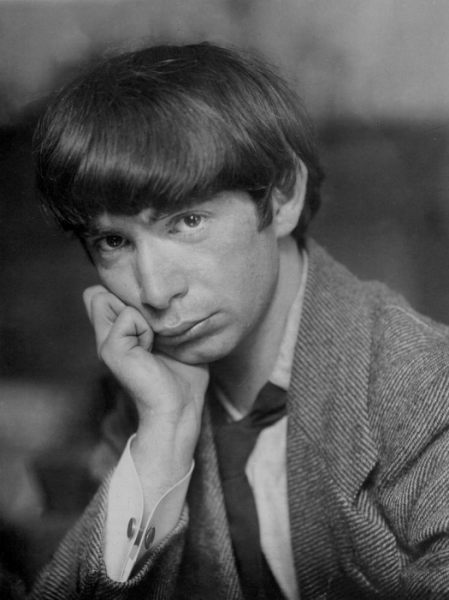
Ossip Zadkine

Please add names of notable painters with a Wikipedia page, in precise English alphabetical order, using U.S. spelling conventions. Country and regional names refer to where painters worked for long periods, not to personal allegiances.

- Ossip Zadkine (1890–1967), Russian painter and sculptor
- Kristian Zahrtmann (1843–1917), Danish painter
- Eugeniusz Żak (1884–1926), Polish painter
- Marcin Zaleski (1796–1877), Polish painter
- Domenico Zampieri (or Domenichino) (1581–1641), Italian painter
- Federico Zandomeneghi (1841–1917), Italian Impressionist painter
- Zao Wou-Ki (趙無極, (1920–2013), Chinese/French painter
- Harriet Zeitlin (born 1929), American painter and sculptor
- Wolfgang Zelmer (born 1948), German painter and etcher
- Zeng Jing (曾鯨, 1568–1650), Chinese painter
- Karl Zerbe (1903–1972), German/American painter
- Zha Shibiao (查士标, 1615–1698), Chinese painter and calligrapher
- Zhan Ziqian (展子虔, mid to late 6th century), Chinese painter
- Zhang Han (張瀚, 1511–1593), Chinese painter, scholar and official
- Zhang Lu (張路, 1464–1538), Chinese painter
- Zhang Sengyao (張僧繇, late 5th-6th century), Chinese ink-wash painter
- Zhang Shengwen (張勝溫, fl. 1163–1189), Chinese painter
- Zhang Shunzi (张舜咨, 14th century), Chinese painter, calligrapher and poet
- Zhang Shuqi (张书旗, 1901–1957), Chinese painter
- Zhang Wo (張渥, 13th century), Chinese painter
- Zhang Xiaogang (張曉剛, born 1958), Chinese painter
- Zhang Xuan (張萱, 713–755), Chinese painter
- Zhang Yan (张彦, 16th–17th centuries), Chinese painter
- Zhang Yan (张焰, born 1963), Chinese painter and director
- Zhang Yin (张崟, 1761–1829), Chinese calligrapher and painter
- Zhang Zeduan (張擇端, 1085–1145), Chinese painter
- Zhang Zongcang (张宗苍, 1686–1756), Chinese painter
- Zhao Mengfu (趙孟頫, 1254–1322), Chinese scholar, painter and calligrapher
- Zhao Yong (趙雍, 1289–1360), Chinese painter
- Zhao Yuan (趙原, 14th century), Chinese painter
- Zhao Zhiqian (赵之谦, 1829–1884), Chinese calligrapher, painter and seal carver
- Zhao Zuo, (趙左, between 14th and 16th centuries), Chinese painter
- Hristofor Zhefarovich (died 1753), Ottoman (Macedonian) painter, engraver and writer
- Zheng Xie (鄭燮, 1693–1765), Chinese painter
- Zhou Chen (周臣, 1460–1535), Chinese painter
- Zhou Fang (周昉, 730–800), Chinese painter
- Zhou Jichang (周季常, fl. late 11th century), Chinese painter
- Zhou Shuxi (周淑禧, 1624–1705), Chinese painter
- Zhou Wenjing (周文靖, fl. pre-1463), Chinese painter
- Zhu Da (八大山人, 1626–1705), Chinese ink-wash painter and calligrapher
- Zhu Derun (朱德潤, 1294–1365), Chinese painter and poet
- Stanislav Zhukovsky (1875–1944) Russian/Polish painter
- Mihály Zichy (1827–1906), Hungarian painter and graphic artist
- Félix Ziem (1821–1911), French painter
- Adrian Zingg (1734–1816), Swiss painter
- Franciszek Żmurko (1859–1910), Polish painter
- Ernest Zobole (1927–1999), Welsh painter and art teacher
- Johann Zoffany (1733–1810), German neoclassical painter
- Zahari Zograf (1810–1853), Bulgarian painter
- Marguerite Zorach (1887–1968), American painter, textile artist and graphic designer
- William Zorach (1889–1966), Lithuanian/American sculptor, artist and writer
- Anders Zorn (1860–1920), Swedish painter, sculptor and etcher/print-maker
- Zou Yigui (鄒一桂, 1686–1772), Chinese painter
- Zou Zhe (鄒喆, 1636–1708), Chinese painter
- Larry Zox (1937–2006), American painter and print-maker
- Jan Zrzavý (1890–1977), Czech painter, graphic artist and illustrator
- Francesco Zuccarelli (1702–1788), Italian painter
- Federico Zuccari (1543–1609), Italian painter and architect
- Ignacio Zuloaga (1870–1945), Spanish (Basque) painter
- Robert Zünd (1826–1909), Swiss painter
- Francisco Zúñiga (1912–1998), Costa Rican/Mexican painter and sculptor
- Francisco de Zurbarán or Zurbarán (1598–1664), Spanish painter
