= List of painters by name beginning with "X" =

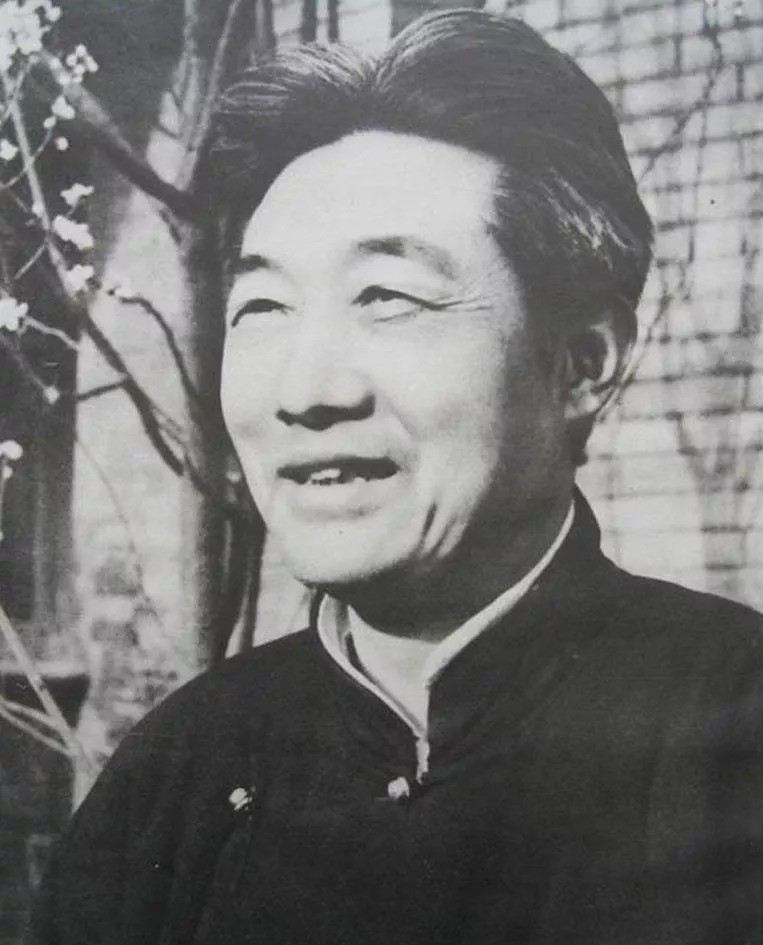
Xu Beihong

Please add names of notable painters with a Wikipedia page, in precise English alphabetical order, using U.S. spelling conventions. Country and regional names refer to where painters worked for long periods, not to personal allegiances.

- Jean Xceron (1890–1967), American painter
- Xi Gang (奚岡, 1746–1803), Chinese painter and seal carver
- Xia Chang (夏昶, 1388–1470), Chinese painter and government official
- Xia Gui (夏珪, fl. 1195–1224), Chinese painter
- Xia Shuwen (夏叔文, fl. 14th or 15th century), Chinese painter
- Xia Yong (夏永, fl. mid-14th century), Chinese painter
- Xiang Shengmo (項聖謨, 1597–1658), Chinese painter
- Xiao Yuncong (蕭雲從, 1596–1673), Chinese painter, calligrapher and poet
- Xie He (謝赫, 6th century), Chinese painter, writer and art historian
- Xie Huan (謝環, fl. 1426–1452), Chinese painter
- Xie Shichen (謝時臣, born 1488), Chinese painter
- Xie Sun (謝蓀, fl. between 17th and 19th centuries), Chinese painter
- Xu Beihong (徐悲鴻, 1895–1953), Chinese shuimohua painter
- Xu Wei (徐渭, 1521–1593), Chinese painter, poet and dramatist
- Xu Xi (徐熙, died pre-975), Chinese painter
- Xuande Emperor (宣德帝, 1398–1435), Chinese painter and emperor
