= Song Maojin =

Song Maojin (simplified Chinese: 宋懋晋; traditional Chinese: 宋懋晉) was a Chinese landscape painter during the Ming dynasty (1368–1644). His specific dates of birth and death are unknown.

Song was born in the Songjiang province. His style name was Mingzhi (明之). Song studied under Song Xu, and his reputation for landscapes rivaled Zhao Zuo and Liu Jue.
