= Shunzi =

Shunzi may refer to:

- Shunzi bian, legend about the Emperor Shun
- Zhang Shunzi (14th century), Chinese calligrapher
- Shunza (born 1973), Chinese–American singer

== See also ==
- Shunzhi (1644–1661), Qing emperor
