= Sheng Mao =

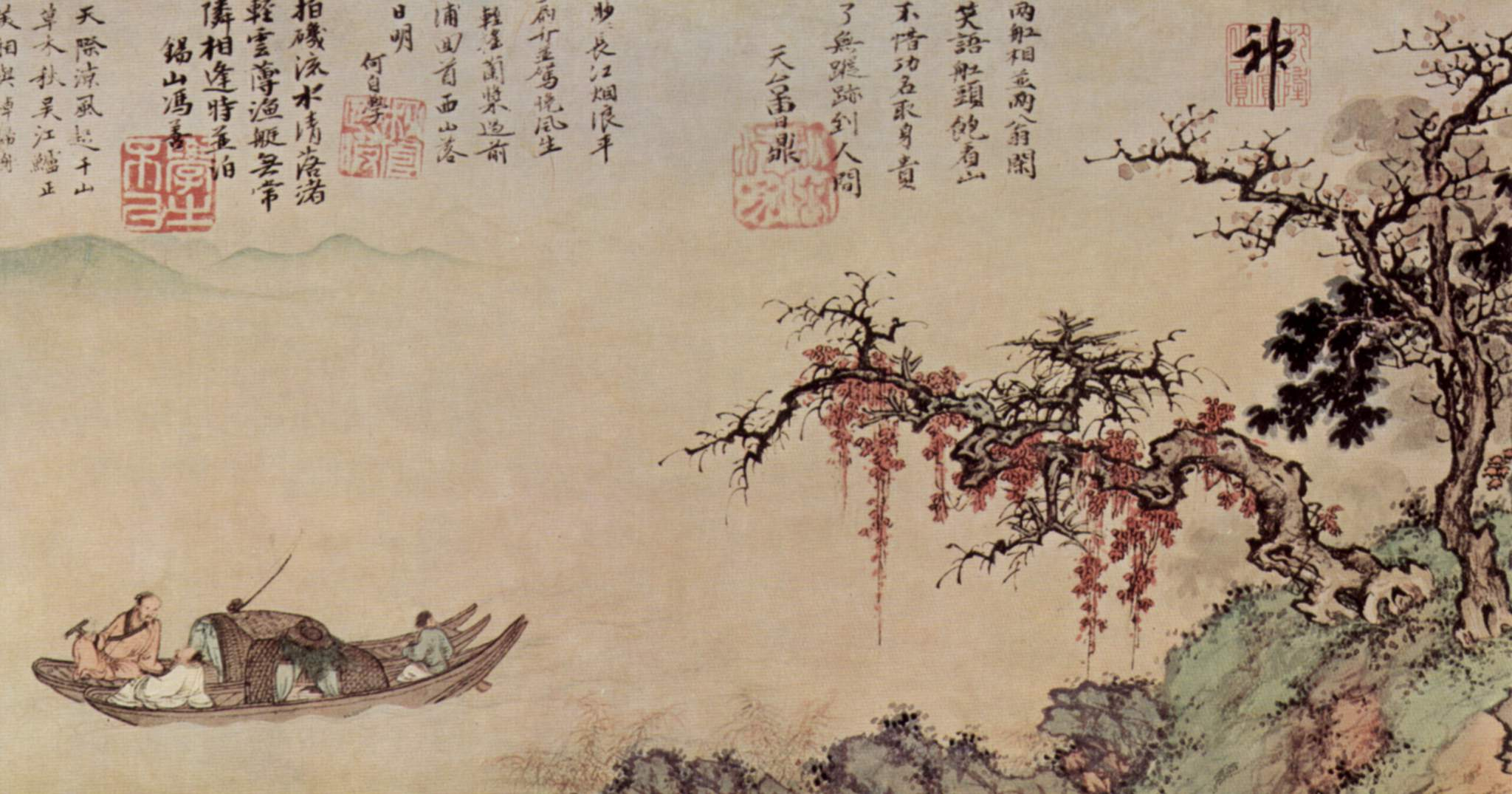
Sheng Mao, Autumn Boat Trip on the River, National Palace Museum, 1361

Shèng Mào (Sheng Mao, traditional: 盛懋, simplified: 盛懋); was a Chinese landscape painter during the Yuan Dynasty (1271–1368). His specific dates of birth and death are not known.

Sheng was born in Jiaxing the Zhejiang province. He was taught by Chen Lin, and later by Zhao Mengfu. Sheng's paintings of landscape and human figures utilized a delicate style with beautiful colors.
