= Yan Zong =

Ming dynasty magistrate, military leader, painter

Yan Zong (颜宗) (1393–1459), courtesy name Xueyuan (学渊), was a native of Nanhai, Guangdong. His rank was Juren. He became a leader in the military in 1457 and a magistrate of Shaowu, Fujian in 1459. He was a famous painter during the Ming Dynasty and good at painting landscapes, which he learnt from Guo Xi, Li Cheng, Huang Gongwang, etc. One of the notable works he created was the 'Lakes and Mountains Scenery' painting.

== Gallery ==
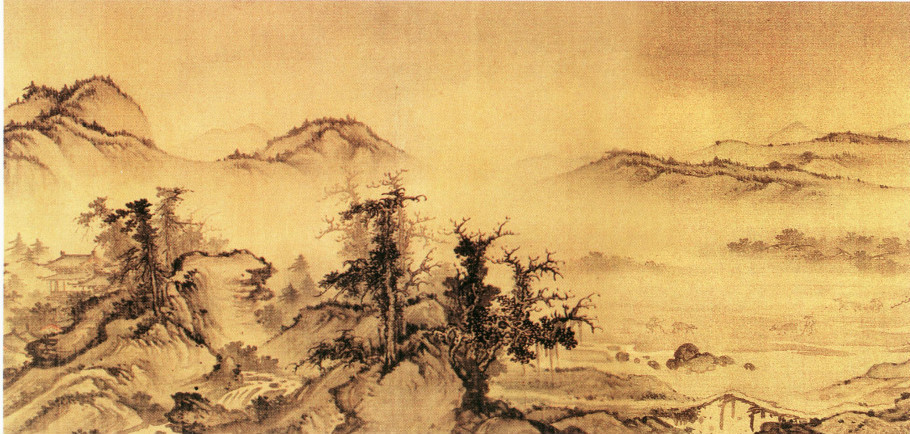
Lakes and Mountains Scenery Painting

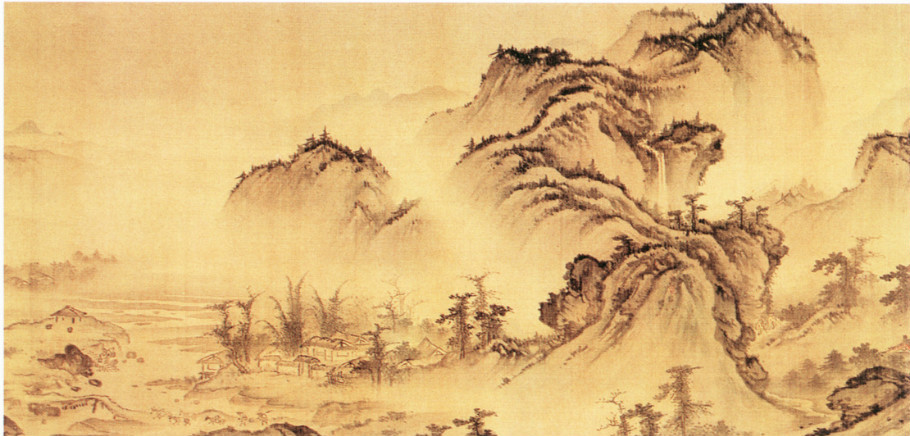
Lakes and Mountains Scenery Painting

== See also ==
- List of Chinese painters
- Chinese painting
