= Pu Hua =

Chinese artist

Pú Huá (Wade–Giles: P'u Hua, traditional: 蒲華, simplified: 蒲华, pinyin: Pú Huá); c. 1834–1911 was a Chinese landscape painter and calligrapher during the Qing Dynasty (1644–1912).

== Information ==
Pu was born in Jiaxing in the Zhejiang province. His style name was 'Zuo Ying'. Pu painted landscapes and ink bamboo in an unconventional style of free and easy brush strokes.
