= Junye Song =

Song Junye or Song Tsiun-Ye or Sung Chün-Yeh (宋駿業), courtesy name: Shengqiu, art name: Jianfu, was a Chinese painter of the 18th century, originally from Changshu (a city in the province of Jiangsu in the China). His birth and death dates are unknown, but he was active around the year 1700.

== Biography ==
Vice-president of the Bureau of War and a painter, Song Junye learned painting under Wang Hui.
The National Palace Museum in Taipei preserves one of his works, Landscape, painted on a fan and accompanied by an inscription by Emperor Qing Kangxi.

== Bibliography ==
- Bénézit Dictionary (1999). Dictionary of Painters, Sculptors, Draftsmen and Engravers (in French). Vol. 13. Gründ Editions. ISBN 2700030230..
