= Shen Shichong =

Shen Shichong (Shen Shih-ch'ung, traditional: 沈士充, simplified: 沈士充); ca. was a Chinese landscape painter during the Ming dynasty (1368–1644). His dates of birth and death are unknown.

Chen was born in Huating in the Shanghai province. His style name was 'Zhong Chun' and his sobriquet was 'Mi Gong'. Chen's painting had a clear and interesting style.
