= Wang Yiguang =

Springtime by Wang Yi Guang

Wang Yiguang (Chinese: 王沂光; pinyin: Wáng Yíguāng) is a modern Chinese painter notable for his Tibetan paintings of flying people, yaks and sheep.

== Biography ==
Wang Yi Guang was born in Yimeng Mountain area of Shandong, China. He is a younger brother of another notable painter, Wang Yidong (王沂东). He graduated from the Central Academy of Fine Arts in Beijing in 1990. He participated in various national and international exhibitions and art fairs in Beijing, Guangzhou, Tokyo and Hong Kong. Wang Yi Guang currently works as a creative designer for the China Railway Construction Corporation.

In 2002 they worked on the Qinghai - Tibet railway. The painter was struck by the "humble beauty" of the Tibet. He wrote:

I have been able to visit the Tibetan plateau a number of times. I've been deeply touched by the breathtaking landscape of Tibet and the happy-go-lucky spirit of the Tibetan people. The Tibetan people's profound regard for the natural world and animals has also cast a life-long impression on me. Their unwavering optimism, all-encompassing and peaceful way of life, are in extreme contrast with the psychological states of modern city dwellers. In my works of life on the Tibetan Plateau, I focus more on movement, so as to convey the beauty of extreme tension and moments of life. When I was in Tibet, I spent a lot of my time lying down in the grass, as I suffered from acute mountain sickness. As I lay there gasping for air, a delightful picture revealed itself before me: a couple of young, spry Tibetan girls racing about the countryside with their herd of yaks. These Tibetan girls reminded me of 'Feitian', the flying Devi (literally: 'goddess')*, when they are still earthly beings. The fairy tale relationship between man and yak, also called "ship of the plateau", came to life right before my eyes. In my series of paintings on the Tibetan plateau, I try to convey the unique psychological journey I experienced during this time. Similarly, these feelings surfaced through long periods of "observing and reflecting". This dream-like state has in turn added a romantic dimension to my works, which can be seen in paintings such as "Sun in a Distant Place" and "Towards the Sun". By applying surrealistic elements the transfer of images can be fully articulated.

In my oil paintings I try and convey my feelings for a target, as though I were encountering it for the first time. I do this by trying to capture its characteristics and intrinsic humour. I believe that painters should integrate their own impression of a certain experience, observation and/or response in their work so as to create expressive images.

The Tibetan works were exhibited in 2004 on a solo exhibition "Retrospective of Tibet - The Spirit and Movement" at the Schoeni Art Gallery of Hong Kong.
