= Wu Zhengyan =

Contemporary Chinese painter based in Beijing

Wu Zhengyan (born 1980, Taiyuan, Shanxi Province) is a contemporary Chinese painter based in Beijing. She graduated from Shanxi University in the Department of Art in 2004 and later taught in Beijing Agriculture college. It was in 2006 that she became a professional artist. As a member of the "post-80s" generation of artists in China, Wu has been involved in several group shows since 2003.

Impressed by the bright colors and patterns, Wu takes the cotton print as a carrier of her language so as to express her thinking towards life through painting. In 2002, she started to draw Coca-Cola, Statue of Liberty, Blessed Mother and Holy Son. Taking a piece of cloth with traditional Chinese Characteristics, she wanted to create a pictorial and language conflict between the two parts mentioned. So she found and installed the typical western images on the cotton print, thus leading to a contrast between the local and the foreign.

Born after the 1980s, Wu has been influence by two different cultures from childhood. The invisible tradition could not be cast away while the western culture was brought in, leading the social development with modernism. To combine the traditional cotton print with western commercial images, she showed her embarrassment under such circumstance.

In her creations afterwards, Wu started to care for life, existence and environment of herself and her surroundings. "Snack wrappings" or computer games were painted on cotton print to show her life and what she felt. Besides, her frustration and pressure while working as a teacher in a university in Beijing was also implied in her art works. Cotton Print is used as her diary book to mark down all those little details in her daily life.

In her latest solo exhibition "Flora Journal" in 798 Art Zone Beijing, paintings on silk as a new attempt in her creation were exhibited. Her latest paintings on cotton print, silk scarf, or canvas have built up some intimacy between human-being, flowers and objects. Standing in front of her artwork, audience explored not only the bright colors but also the details hidden behind the flowers and leaves. The details from the microphone of "Chinese Talent Show" to grandpa Colonel Sanders in KFC, have interspersed humour into the paintings.

It could be said that Wu Zhengyan expresses her thoughts towards art and life through her experiences in everyday life, just as by William Blake in "Auguries of Innocence", "To see a World in a grain of sand/And a heaven in a wild flower."

== Exhibitions ==
Solo Exhibition :

- 2008 Yan’s Flower, Zhengyan Wu at Mountain Art Beijing Frank Lin Art Center, 798 Beijing
- 2010 Flora Journal, Mountain Art Beijing Frank Lin Art Center, 798 Beijing

Group Exhibition :

- 2003 The beginning—present age oil painting arts exhibition, Shanxi, Taiyuan
- 2003 The endless melody picture—explained photography exhibition, Shanxi, Yuci
- 2004 Pingyao international photography festival, Shanxi, Pingyao
- 2008 Art international HK 2008, HongKong
- 2008 "Go China", Mountain Art Beijing Frank Lin Art Center, 798
- 2008 Korea International Art Fair, Seoul, Korea
- 2008 "Present 2008!", PYO Gallery, 798, Beijing
- 2009 "Enliven - In Between Realities and Fiction" Animamix Biennial, Today Art Museum
- 2009 "La Puissance De La Femme", 798, Beijing
- 2011 "Made in China-New Chinese Contemporary Art Scene" National Dr. Sun Yat-sen Memorial Hall, Taipei
- 2011 Shanghai Contemporary 2011, Shanghai Exhibition Hall, Shanghai
- 2011 Made in China——New Chinese Contemporary Art Scene, Mountain Art Beijing & Frank Lin Art Center, Beijing
- 2011 Language of Flowers——Group Exhibition of Artists, Mountain Art Beijing & Frank Lin Art Center, Beijing
- 2012 Art Beijing 2012, National Agricultural Exhibition Hall, Beijing
- 2012 2012 Next Super Stars, CANS Tea & Books House, Taipei
