= Cao Buxing =

3rd century Eastern Wu artist

- Traditional Chinese: 曹不興
- Simplified Chinese: 曹不兴
Transcriptions
Standard Mandarin
- Hanyu Pinyin: Cáo Bùxìng
- Wade–Giles: Ts'ao Pu-hsing

Cao Buxing was a painter of the state of Eastern Wu during the Three Kingdoms period of Chinese history. He lived in Wuxing (in present-day Zhejiang). His name is sometimes written as Cao Fuxing (曹弗興). He excelled in painting dragons, tigers and human figures.
