= Wang Zhongyu (painter) =

Chinese painter

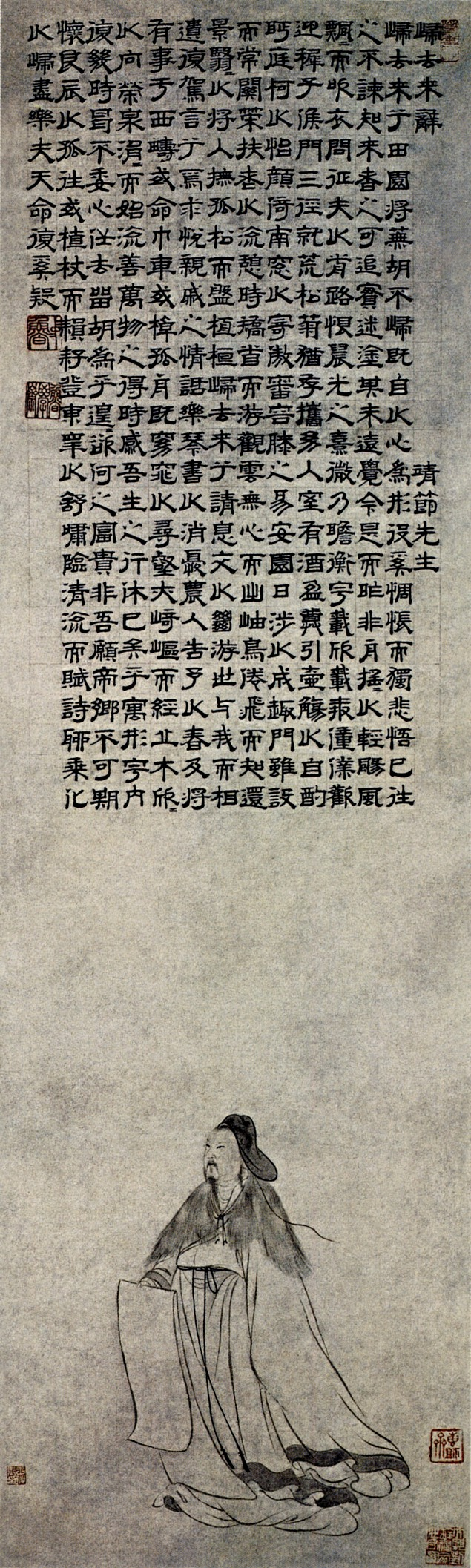
- Master Jingjie, a painting by Wang Zhongyu
- Chinese: 王仲玉
Transcriptions
Standard Mandarin
- Hanyu Pinyin: Wáng Zhòngyù
- Wade–Giles: Wang Chung-yü

Wang Zhongyu (fl. 14th century) was a Chinese painter during the Hongwu Era (1368–1398) of the Ming dynasty. He was known for painting people. Little else is known of his life.
