= Sheng Maoye =

Sheng Maoye (Sheng Mao-yeh, traditional: 盛茂燁, simplified: 盛茂烨); was a Chinese landscape painter during the Ming dynasty (1368–1644). His specific dates of birth and death are unknown.

Sheng was born in Suzhou in Jiangsu province, where he made his reputation and career. His sobriquet was 'Nian An'. Sheng's landscapes have a foggy and spacious atmosphere, and often suggest a pervasive nostalgia in a fin-de-siècle Suzhou.

His work is held in the permanent collections of several museums worldwide, including the Indianapolis Museum of Art, the Metropolitan Museum of Art, the Walters Art Museum, the University of Michigan Museum of Art, the British Museum, and the Nelson-Atkins Museum of Art.
