= Zhang Renxi (artist) =

Chinese artist, poet, calligrapher

Zhang Renxi (simplified Chinese: 张人希; traditional Chinese: 張人希; Pe̍h-ōe-jī: Tiuⁿ Jîn-hi, 15 December 1918 – 27 July 2010), also known as Zhang Renxi (simplified Chinese: 张仁熙; traditional Chinese: 張仁熙; Pe̍h-ōe-jī: Tiuⁿ Jîn-hi), Jiaye (simplified Chinese: 迦叶; traditional Chinese: 迦葉; Pe̍h-ōe-jī: Khia-ia̍p), Shengshi (胜是, Buddhist name), and House of Flowing Water Sound Listening (simplified Chinese: 听沨楼; traditional Chinese: 聽渢樓; Pe̍h-ōe-jī: Thiaⁿ-hông-lâu), was born in Quanzhou City, Fujian, China. He was a Chinese artist and poet, best known for his exquisite Chinese paintings of birds and flowers as well as fine seal carvings and calligraphy work.

== Biography ==
His father died ten months after he was born, and his widowed mother lived on needlework to support the family. At 7 years of age, Zhang Renxi found copies of The Mustard Seed Garden Atlas and Ancient and Modern Celebrity Pictures in the drawers of his father’s coffin, and used these to practice calligraphy. To earn money, he painted and sold Spring Festival couplets in the local marketplace. He received two years education in primary school, but was unable to continue his studies due to poverty. He became an apprentice to a doctor, then a painter, and later, a proofreader and reporter for the "Fujian Daily" newspaper.

- 1938, Buddhist Master Hong Yi(Li Shutong, 李叔同) favor the stone stamp of Abbot Jue Yuan of Tongfo Temple made by Zhang, and invited the seal cutter Renxi Zhang to come and granted him the Buddhist name Shengshi(胜是), and be very close after then.
- He was a reporter for Fujian Daily stationed in Shisi City during the second world war, and built up friendship with Huang Yongyu(黄永玉) who studied at Jimei Secondary School.
- 1977, recognized Ye Shengtao, Yu Pingbo, and Liu Haisu as mentors, and became good friends.
- 1981, became a member of the Chinese Artists Association.
- 1986, served as vice president of Xiamen Painting and Calligraphy Academy.
- 1989, served as the consultant of the Hong Kong Fujian Painting and Calligraphy Research Association.
- 1994, won the Philippines' International Cultural Exchange Gold Medal of Honor, the Taiwan ROC Fourth Poetry, Calligraphy, Painting, Photography Exhibition on the works of Chinese Painting Jinling Award 金岭奖, a member of the California Association of Chinese Art.
- held solo exhibitions in several cities in the U.S., Taiwan, Singapore and China, and was involved in Japan's "Chinese first class painting and calligraphy exhibition" in 1986, and participated in Nagoya "Japan Ink Painting Exhibition on behalf of writers" in 1993.

== Works ==
His works include:

- 1980 series, the 1st National Calligraphy and Seal Cutting Exhibition Works Collection
- 1990, the Dictionary of Contemporary Chinese Calligraphers (Yellow River Press)
- 1991, the Dictionary of Modern Chinese Calligraphy Celebrity (Henan Art Press)
- 1992, the Chinese Contemporary Art List (Shanghai People's Fine Arts Publishing House), Dictionary of Contemporary and Seal Artist List (Harbin Publishing House)
- 1993, the China Thousand Painting and Calligraphy Works Collection (Hong Kong Chinese Wing Bookstore Ltd.), Chinese Art Yearbook 1949–1989 (National Museum of Fine Arts), China and India Yearbook 1988–1992 (Xiling Seal-Engraving Society), Chinese contemporary painting and Seal Cutting Celebrity Dictionary (Henan Fine Arts Publishing House)
- 1992, the painting The Pines and Kapok for the Chinese People's Revolutionary Military Museum, and published.
- 1999, the Celebration of the Fiftieth Anniversary of the Establishment of the People's Republic of Calligraphy Exhibition Series Works (CFLACPC)
- 2004, the Chinese Artists Association 1949–2002 Member Dictionary (People's Fine Arts Publishing House), Fujian Province Dictionary of Literature and Art (Writers Publishing House)
- Name and introduction elected and listed in Dictionary of Chinese Contemporary Country Artist (Zhejiang Academy of Fine Version), Dictionary of Modern Chinese Celebrity (Zhejiang ancient version), Dictionary of Chinese Artists Supplement (Xilingyinshe Version) Published
- Zhang Renxi Flowers and Birds, ISBN 7-5615-1390-9/J.36, Aug 1998 by Xiamen University Press
- Zhang Renxi Works Collection, ISBN 7-80610-414-3/J/22, Dec 2000 by Lujiang Publishing House

== Family ==
- Mother: Yishe Wang
- Wife: Huiruo Li
- Children: 4 sons and 3 daughters 4
- Grandchildren: 4 grandsons and 7 granddaughters
