= Wang Yuan (painter) =

Chinese landscape painter

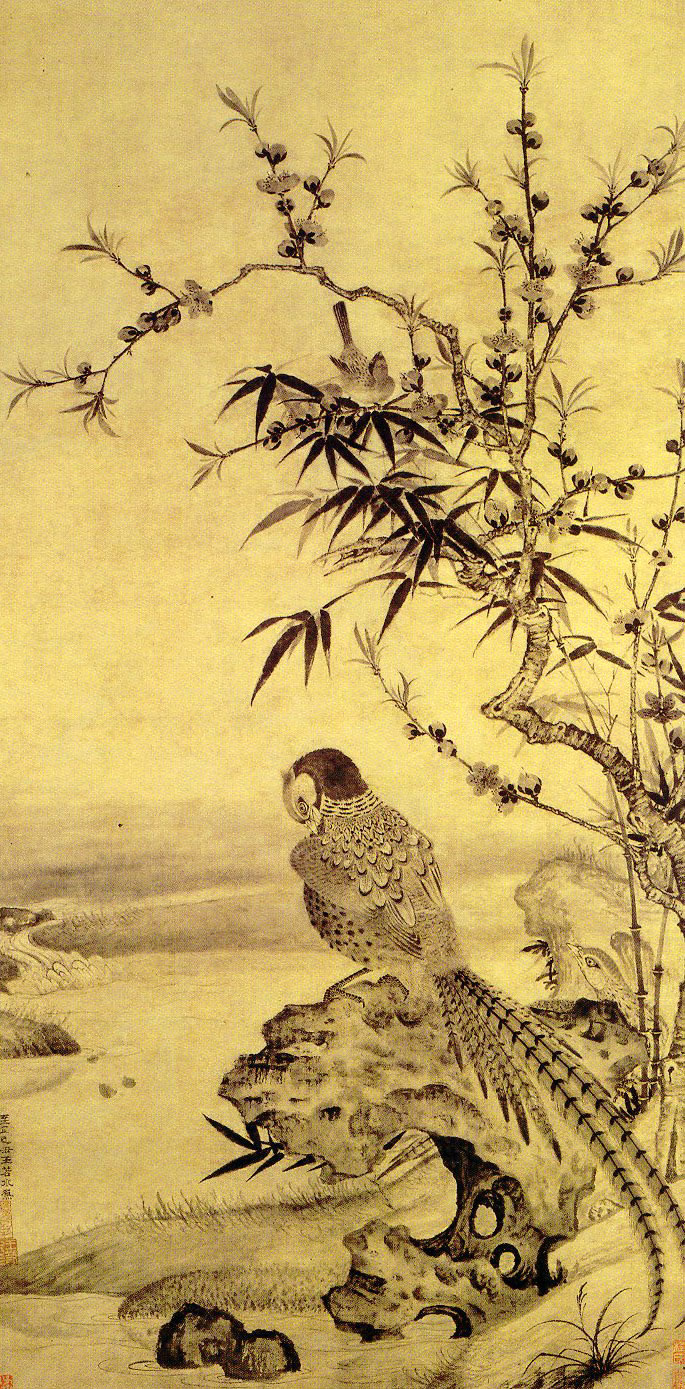
Wang Yuan, Pheasant and Small Bird with Peach and Bamboo 山桃锦鸡图. Hanging scroll, ink on paper. Size: 111.9 × 55.7 cm. Palace Museum

Wang Yuan (simplified Chinese: 王渊; traditional Chinese: 王淵; pinyin: Wáng Yuān; Wade–Giles: Wang Yüan); was a Chinese landscape painter during the Yuan Dynasty (1271–1368). His specific dates of birth and death are not known.

Wang was born in Qian Tang (钱塘, modern day Hangzhou in the Zhejiang province). His style name was 'Ruoshui' (若水) and his pseudonym was 'Danxuan' (澹轩). Wang imitated Guo Xi for landscapes, Huang Quan for bird-and-flower paintings, and Tang Ren for human figures. He trained under Zhao Mengfu with most of his works dating around 1340. He utilized a minute and brilliant style in all his works.
