= Wang Qiucen =

Wang Qiucen (Chinese: 王秋岑; pinyin: Wáng Qiūcén, 1913–1993) was a Chinese painter who specialized in traditional Chinese portrait and landscape paintings.

== Life ==
Wang, who was born in Changzhou, Jiangsu Province, started painting at the age of 12. He split the first 20 years of his life between Shanghai and his hometown in Jiangsu. By 1940, he was already well-recognized in the art community, having held several personal exhibitions in Shanghai and Chongqing. Many famous literati and political figures, including Shi Liang, He Luting, Zhu Xuefan, Liu Yazi and Qian Xiaoshan were among his friends at the time. His biggest patron was Du Yuesheng, the infamous "Godfather" of Shanghai.

He joined Kuomintang and held civil positions in the 1930s in the Shanghai Municipality. After the Chinese Communist Party took over China in 1949, he was determined to be "anti-revolutionary", was physically tortured in 1959 and forced to repent in writing for his political belief. In the 1960s, he was sent to the countryside again to be "re-educated". He continued to paint during his exile. The majority of the works that bear his seal were created during this period.

In early 1980s, the government allowed him to return to his hometown Suzhou from his exile. The Suzhou municipality government appointed him as the principal art designer of a major arts and crafts producer. Merchandises such as Chinese paintings, decorative fans, silk screen dividers exported to Japan and Southeast Asia markets during the 1980s were mostly produced by his many apprentices. However, due to his political history, he was never allowed to be recognized publicly or to hold any significant position under the communist rule.

His works are collected by Ashmolean Museum in Oxford, UK, and Asian Art Museum in San Francisco.
