= Liu Zhengxing =

Chinese artist (born 1952)

Liu Zhengxing (Chinese: 刘正兴; pinyin: Liú Zhèngxìng) (1952 - ) is a contemporary Chinese artist based in Chengdu, China. He is known for his ink and oil paintings, particularly of those depicting the Tibetan landscape. He is president of the Chengdu Art Association and member of the China Artists Association.

As a youngster he was sent down to the countryside as a "sent-down youth" where he remained for five years. Beginning as an amateur artist his first major work was the woodcut series ‘Taking Root under the Tree'. In the 1970s he trained as a graphic designer and later studied under the influence of Li Youxing.
