= Li Daoxi =

Li Daoxi (Chinese name, 李道熙) (1920–2007) was a well-known Chinese painter and calligrapher. He was a prestigious member of the Beijing Academy of Painting and Calligraphy and also Chairman of Leshan Artists Association. His works are widely reported by private Chinese media like Sina.com, Tencent, Sohu.com, 163.com, as well as the state media agency China Central Television. Li Daoxi is particularly famous for painting objects like goats, flowers and birds. His paintings have been collected by Deng Xiaoping, Jiang Zemin, Jia Qinglin, Li Changchun, Li Peng, Qiao Shi, Wei Jianxing, Zhang Xuezhong and US Ambassador to China Leonard Woodcock.

== Major events ==
- 1979–1980, painting gifts for Deng Xiaoping at Jinniu Hotel, Chengdu, China
- 1992, was invited to Tiananmen Square for painting
- 1996, was invited to Zhongnanhai for painting and presented paintings to Zhu Rongji, then-Prime Minister of China
- 1999, painting gifts for Li Peng, China's Prime Minister
- 2000, painting for Li Lanqing, Vice Premier of the State Council of the People's Republic of China
- 2003, painting "Ram" as gifts for Jia Qinglin (7th Chairman of the National Committee of the CPPCC) and Li Changchun (Chairman of the CPC Central Guidance Commission for Building Spiritual Civilization)
- 2005, calligraphy and paintings for Tung Chee-hwa (Former Chief Executive of Hong Kong)
- 2006, 12 paintings for Jiang Zemin, former President of China.
