= Lam Wai Kit =

Chinese artist (born 1966)

- 林慧潔; Lin Huijie
- Born: 1966 (age 59–60); Hong Kong, China
- Education: Goldsmiths College; The Chinese University of Hong Kong
- Known for: Photography, video art, mixed media

Lam Wai Kit (Chinese: 林慧潔; pinyin: Lin Huijie; born 1966) is a Chinese artist born in Hong Kong. Lam graduated with her BA (Hons) in Fine Art at the Goldsmiths College, University of London, UK in 1996. In 2003, she graduated with her MFA at The Chinese University of Hong Kong.

== Career ==
Lam's media included photography, video art and mixed media. From 1996, she held several solo and group exhibitions in Hong Kong, Shanghai, Italy and Canada. Her works have been collected by the Hong Kong Heritage Museum, and also private collections in UK, Italy, Germany, Portugal, Canada, America, Australia, and Hong Kong. Selected works by Lam, Divided Minds (22) (2006) and Divided Minds (36) (2006), are featured on Google Cultural Institute's Google Art Project.

Lam is also an art educator and is now teaching at several art institutes in visual art and cultural studies. Lam works in a variety of media, including installation, photography, and video art.

== Solo exhibitions ==
1996

- Change / Goldsmiths, University of London, London, UK

1997

- Beyond Colours / Dragon's Back Gallery at the Fringe, Hong Kong

1998

- This is you; this is not you / Agfa Gallery at the Fringe, Hong Kong

2000

- Frozen Words II - Dialogues within Oneself / First Institute of Art & Design Gallery, Hong Kong
- Frozen Words / The Gallery, Art Forest, Toronto, Canada
- The Secret Gardens / Montblanc Gallery at the Fringe, Hong Kong

2002

- Displacement / First Institute of Art & Design Gallery, Hong Kong

2004

- The Other / Shanghai Street Artspace, Hong Kong

2007

- The Other Month; The Other Day / Schmidt Leica Photo Gallery, Hong Kong
- The Divided Minds V - Photography and video installation by Wai Kit Lam / Amelia Johnson Contemporary, Hong Kong

2009

- Unknown - Works by Wai Kit Lam, Artists in the Neighbourhood Scheme IV / Hong Kong Film Archive & Tse Wan Shan Centre, Hong Kong

2012

- Five Senses - A series of 5 videos by Wai Kit Lam / Aesop Cityplaza, Hong Kong
- Sleight - Wai Kit Lam / Lumenvisum, Hong Kong
- Small But Great - photography, video art & sound by Wai Kit Lam / Casa Monsaraz, Monsaraz, Portugal

== Residency programs participated ==
- 2005/6 – 12: FUSE :: fusion: encoding future, Videotage / Hong Kong
- 2009/10 - 12: Takt Kunstprojektraum Artist Residency / Berlin, Germany
- 2011/1: Fundación Valparaíso / Mojácar, Spain
- 2012/11: 12: LKV - Lademoen Kunstnerverkstede / Trondheim, Norway
- 2012/3: Casa Monsaraz / Monsaraz, Portugal
- 2014/3: Lichtenberg Studios / Berlin, Germany

== Selected grants received ==
- 2002/6: Research Grant, Art Museum / The Chinese University of Hong Kong
- 2009/10 - 12: "Destination Berlin"—Artist-in-Residence Subsidy Scheme / Hong Kong Arts Development Council
- 2011/1: Fundación Valparaíso / Mojácar, Spain

== Selected works ==
- The Green Mirror 綠色鏡子 (1993), colour photograph, size unknown
- This is you; this is not you 是你；不是你 (1998) b/w digital video 18’
- The Secret Gardens: Portrait no. 2 秘密庭園：人像二 (1999) b/w photograph, silicon rubber, wood plate 7.5"x 15.5"
- The Secret Gardens: Portrait no. 3 秘密庭園：人像三 (1999) b/w photograph, silicon rubber, wood plate 7.5" x 15.5"
