= Nie Ou =

Chinese artist (born 1948)

- Born: 1948 (age 77–78); Shenyang, Liaoning
- Education: China Central Academy of Fine Arts
- Style: Ink wash

Nie Ou (Chinese: 聶鷗; born 1948) is a Chinese artist known for her ink wash paintings that depict rural scenes. In addition to her work with traditional Chinese mediums such as shuimuohua (ink & color), Nie has proved herself to be a highly versatile artist capable of producing work in a variety of mediums throughout her career, including drawing and oil painting.

== Biography ==
Nie Ou was born in 1948 in Shenyang, Liaoning province. In 1954, her family moved to Beijing.

Nie studied with Xu Beihong, Li Keran, Li Kuchan, and Ye Qianyu at the China Central Academy of Fine Arts. She completed her postgraduate training there in 1981, and joined the Beijing Painting Academy as a professional painter that year. She married fellow artist Sun Weimin (b. 1946) in 1982.

Nie mainly paints in ink and at times in oil. She is known for her works that depict rural life. Observers have noted an evolution in Nie's style since 1985. Lucy Lim, curator of the Chinese Culture Center in San Francisco, wrote that Nie's art became "more Chinese, less Western" at that time, capturing a "distillation of reality" as is typical of traditional Chinese paintings. Art historian Shao Yiyang described her style as "modern" and "typified by freer brushstrokes." She added that Nie's work demonstrates "a feminine sensitivity, meticulous detail, and ordered calm."

Nie's works are held in the public collections of the British Museum, Hong Kong Museum of Art, Asian Art Museum, CAFA Art Museum, Art Gallery of New South Wales, and Williams College Museum of Art.

== Artistic training ==
After moving to Beijing, Nie Ou received her early arts education at the Beijing Youth Palace. The academic structure there closely resembled the Western model, and taught techniques like drawing, foreshortening, and chairoscuro. This Western influence was largely derived from the communist government's desire to parallel Soviet socialist realism, which government officials at the time felt was the appropriate artistic style for a communist society.

Although Nie dreamed of attending an art academy as a young adult, her artistic path was interrupted by the impetus of the Cultural Revolution in 1966. Due to her family's social status, Nie was summoned to be a part of a youth rustication campaign in Shanxi. She remained there for over a decade, a period that is often referred to in Chinese history as the "Black Decade", when artists were severely persecuted and silenced. Although her official education was largely put on pause during this decade, her experiences of this rural landscape inspired her artwork for the rest of her career. Her depictions of Shanxi and its peasant residents were often calm, idyllic, and whimsical, offering a more intimate perspective on peasant life that differed from the energetic and devoted workers of government propaganda images from that era.

In 1978, Nie was accepted to the Central Academy of Fine Arts (CAFA), the leading arts academy in the nation. At CAFA, Nie was exposed to shuimohua (ink & color painting) for the first time, after having received her early training in Western mediums. She was 30 years old at the time of her acceptance, which also marked her official entrance into the Chinese art world.

== Later work ==
In 1990, Nie Ou and her husband traveled to Europe, where Nie was inspired by European artists like Camille Pissaro, Vincent van Gogh, and Jean-Francois Millet. In this period of her work, Nie fused visual concepts of realism and modernism, and experimented with a bold color palette that differed from the Chinese ink paintings of her earlier career.
