= Zhou Zhimian =

Zhou Zhimian (Chinese: 周之冕), courtesy name as Fuqing, sobriquet as Shaogu, is a noted Chinese painter in Ming Dynasty. His birth and death years are unknown. He was born in Changshu, Jiangsu Province.

He excelled at bird-and-flower painting, especially domestic birds. He observed the birds flying and eating, and painted them in a pure and terse taste.
