= Sun Junze =

Chinese painter

Sun Junze (Chinese: 孙君泽) was a famed Chinese painter in Yuan Dynasty. His birth and death years are unknown.

Sun was born in Hangzhou in the Zhejiang province. Sun painted primarily landscapes and human figures. His style followed Ma Yuan and Xia Gui, and had a direct influence on the formation of Zhejiang School later in the Ming Dynasty.
