= Liu Changming =

- Born: 1952 (age 73–74)
- Occupations: Painter, fine arts educator
- Known for: Watercolor and gouache paintings

Liu Changming (simplified Chinese: 刘昌明; traditional Chinese: 劉昌明; pinyin: liú chāng míng) is a Chinese watercolor and gouache painter, oil painter, and fine arts educator.

== Biography ==
Liu Changming was born in 1952 in Ganzhou, Jiangxi. He mainly teaches western painting and theory.

In 1981 he graduated from Gannan Normal University Art Department, then in 1986 he graduated from the oil painting department of China Central Academy of Fine Arts, and in 1996 from CAFA and the Graduate School of Art Institute of Xiamen University.

He is also a member of China Artists Association, and a member of the China Watercolor Painters Association. He is entitled to State Special Allowance by the China State Council and is concurrently a Professor and Master Supervisor of the Art Academy of Soochow University (Suzhou).

== Artistic accomplishments ==
1. Silver prize in the Sixth National Art Exhibition in 1989 (China's top level specification and the largest national fine arts exhibition. Sponsored by Ministry of Culture of the People's Republic of China, China Federation of Literary and Art Circles and the Chinese Artists Association, held every five years. Silver Award was the highest award that year, the Gold Award was not made).
2. Silver prize in the Fourth National watercolor exhibition.
3. Bronze prize in the Eighth National Art Exhibition.
4. Gold prize in the Third East China college professors Art Exhibition.
5. Excellence award in the joint art exhibition of Taiwan and Guangdong in 1990.
6. Golden Horse Prize in the Hangzhou national watercolor painting exhibition in 1991.
7. Excellence award in Invitational Exhibition of China, Australia and Hong Kong's greatest watercolor painters in 2000.
8. Inducted into "Chinese watercolor Centennial Retrospective Exhibition (1905-2006)" in 2006.(Sponsored by Ministry of Culture of the People's Republic of China, China Artists Association and National Art Museum of China, is a summary of centuries of Chinese watercolor. 300 Chinese watercolor representative works joined the exhibition)
9. "Net Fish series#2" was selected into the eighth National Watercolor/Gouache exhibition in 2007. (Sponsored by China Artists Association, a national academic exhibition held every two years)
10. Excellence award in the First Oil painting exhibition of China Artists Association members in 2012.

== Influences ==
Liu's works are held in the collections of the National Art Museum of China, and other museums, galleries in China and abroad. His painting A Teacher's Table is part of the National Art Museum of China's collection.

Liu was among 33 painters from mainland China whose works were selected for inclusion in the Cross-Strait Famous Artists Watercolor Exhibition, sponsored by Taiwan's Ministry of Culture, the Ministry of Education, and the Chiang Kai-shek Memorial Hall. His works have appeared in publications including Collection Treasures of the National Art Museum of China, Outstanding Art Collection of the 50 Years of the People's Republic of China, and China's Modern Art Collection. His publications include Drawing Towards Watercolor, Liu Changming Album, and The Boundary of the Watercolor.
