= Ma Shi =

Chinese landscape painter, court astronomer and poet

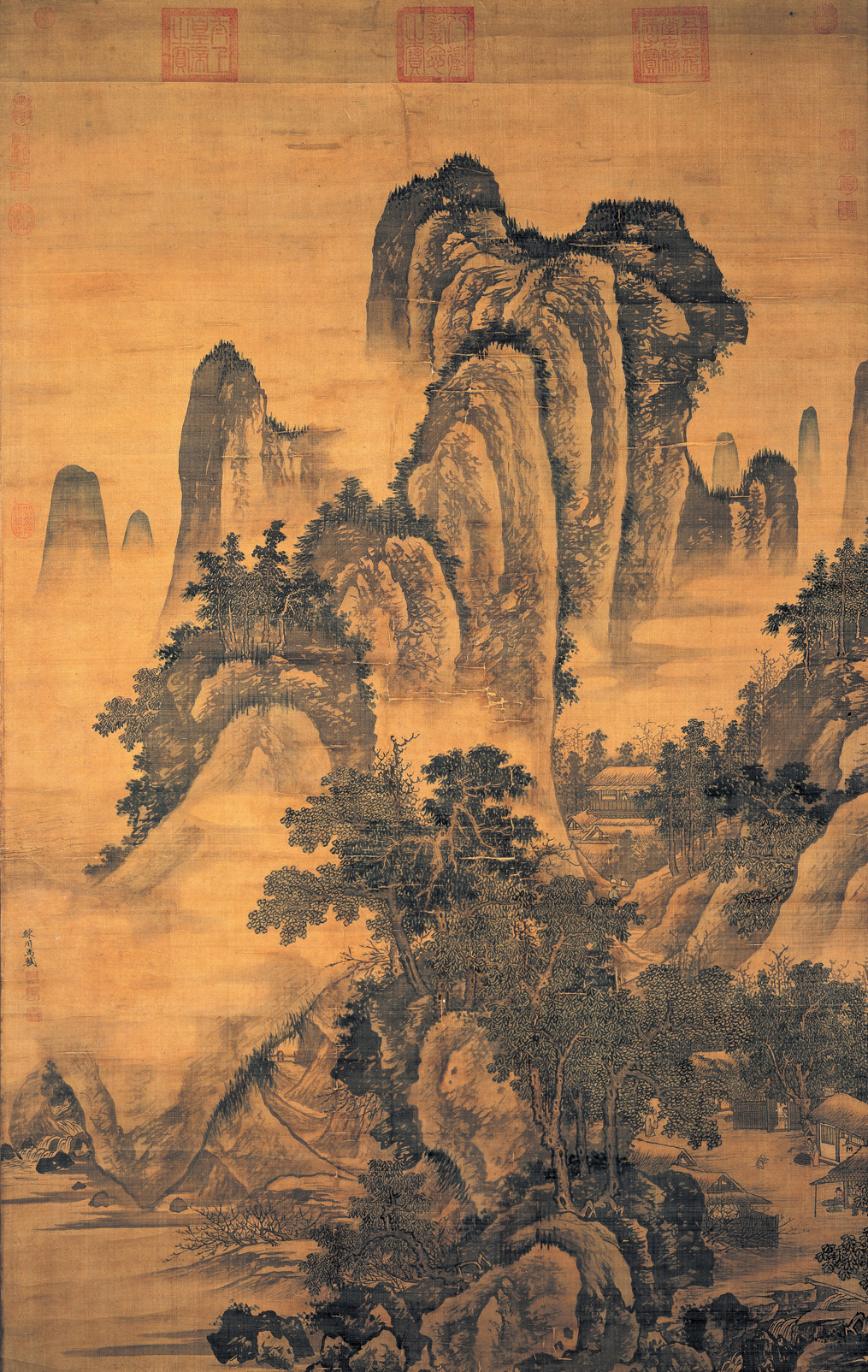
Ma Shi, Living in a Mountain Village in Spring, National Palace Museum, Taipei

Ma Shi (simplified Chinese: 马轼; traditional Chinese: 馬軾; pinyin: Mǎ Shì; Wade–Giles: Ma Shih, fl. 15th century), courtesy name as Jingzhan (敬瞻), was a Chinese landscape painter, court astronomer, and poet during the Xuande era of the early Ming dynasty. His birth and death years are unknown. He was a native of Jiading (modern day Shanghai).
