= Yin Zhaohui =

Chinese painter (born 1977)

Yin Zhaohui (born 1977) is an artist based in Beijing.

== Background and style ==
Yin was born in Henan, China in 1977. Yin graduated from China's Central Academy of Fine Arts in 2004. Yin is a painter depicting ambiguous scenes of the human form. Yin Zhaohui works mostly with oil paint on canvas. His art consistently features subject matter of the human body, which is painted from photographs rather than real life. Yin chooses not to paint from life in order to emphasize the degeneration and disconnect of reality when it is transferred to a photograph. As the world has grown in consumerism and become more technologically advanced, artistic observers have been also shaped according to way in which society progresses. Yin Zhaohui comments on the filter that observers bring in viewing things such as fine art as a result of what they are exposed to in the modern world. This accounts for the lifeless, muted tone of his paintings. One gets a sense of time in Yin's artwork; the dead tone and shading of the images suggest the decay in an individual's sense of time. Yin's paintings encourage the observer to go inward and contemplate their concept of self and their role as an observer in society. Yin often focuses on the hands and face in his paintings, to further challenge the viewer's ideas about what is natural or real and what is not. Yin also uses a grayscale palette and areas with forced lighting or diffused focus to further emphasize how we perceive these details of the natural human body. The use of human hands and faces stresses an intimate theme in Yin's paintings. The face and the hands, especially in connection to each other, hold many emotional connotations, and both are used in one way or another as a portal to the inner self. His modern art differs from the avant-garde style that many others utilize in China; Yin chooses to retain classical topics and techniques that turn the viewer's attention to the inner self.

=== Brother ===
Yin has a twin brother, Yin Zhaoyu, who displayed artwork alongside his brother in the exhibition “Departures” in 2008 at the Aura Gallery. Yin Zhaoyu's work most clearly reflected the title of the exhibit with his paintings that depict airports surrounded by a vast space. Both artists "stick to classical techniques and themes". The brothers' artwork has a hold on desolation and solitude. While his brother's artwork involves a more broad perspective of the world, Yin Zhaohui's artwork has a more intimate focus. Yin Zhaohui draws the viewer inward, and Yin Zhaoyu encourages the viewer to observe their vast surroundings.

== Significant works ==
Untitled This piece which features what appears to be a close-up mass of entwined fingers is perhaps the single piece of artwork that is most recognizable of Yin Zhaohui's work, and most thoroughly represents his artistic style. This oil on canvas painting was inspired by John Coplans' Self Portrait Fingers, a series of photographs that show Coplan's own hands in various sexually suggestive positions. In this painting, Yin turns a natural and much-used part of the human body to communicate something that seems foreign and lack-luster. The overall tone of the painting is a dull grey-blue hue, which evokes a sense of stagnancy. Sexual undertones are also apparent in this piece, evidenced by Yin's influence from John Coplans.

== Group exhibitions ==
Swordsman: May–June 2011, Aura Gallery, Beijing

Dong Gallery New Art: October–November 2010, Dong Gallery, Beijing

Invisible Wings: October 2010, Times Art Museum, Beijing

Immersion: September 2010, Nuoart, Beijing

Dong Gallery New Art: July- August 2010, Dong Gallery, Beijing

Into the Mood: May–June 2010, Hong Kong

Reshaping History: Chinart from 2000 to 2009: May 2010, China National Convention Center, Beijing

Dong Gallery@Art Beijing 2010 Contemporary Art Fair: April–May 2010, National Agriculture Exhibition Center, Beijing

Dong Gallery@China International Gallery Exposition 2010: April 2010, China World Trade Center, Beijing

Dong Gallery New Art Show: January–February 2010, Dong Gallery, Beijing

The Revolution Continues: New Chinese Art: October 2008, Saatchi Gallery, London, UK

Yi Zhaohui, Yi Zhaoyu’s Oil Painting Exhibition: September 2008, Can Art Center, Beijing

R-Art Space Inaugural Exhibition: August 2008, 798 R-space, Beijing

OPENING- Summer Group Show: July 2008, Aura Gallery, Beijing

Yin Zhaohui and Yin Zhaoyu- Departure: April–May 2008, Aura Gallery, Shanghai

Night Walking- Group Exhibition of New Generation Artists: March 2008, Asia Art Center, Beijing

Crazy: September- October 2007, Aura Gallery, Shanghai

Aura Gallery@shContemporary 07: September 2007, Shanghai

Asian Contemporary Art Fair: November 2007, City's Pier 92, New York

Art Singapore 2007: October 2007, Suntec Singapore, Singapore
