= Yao Tingmei =

Yao Tingmei (Yao T'ing-mei, traditional: 姚廷美, simplified: 姚廷美); was a Chinese landscape painter during the Yuan Dynasty (1271–1368). His specific dates of birth and death are not known.

Yao was born in Huzhou in the Zhejiang province. Yao's paintings of landscapes utilized profound and skilled strokes which following the style of Guo Xi.
