= Xia Shuwen =

Chinese painter

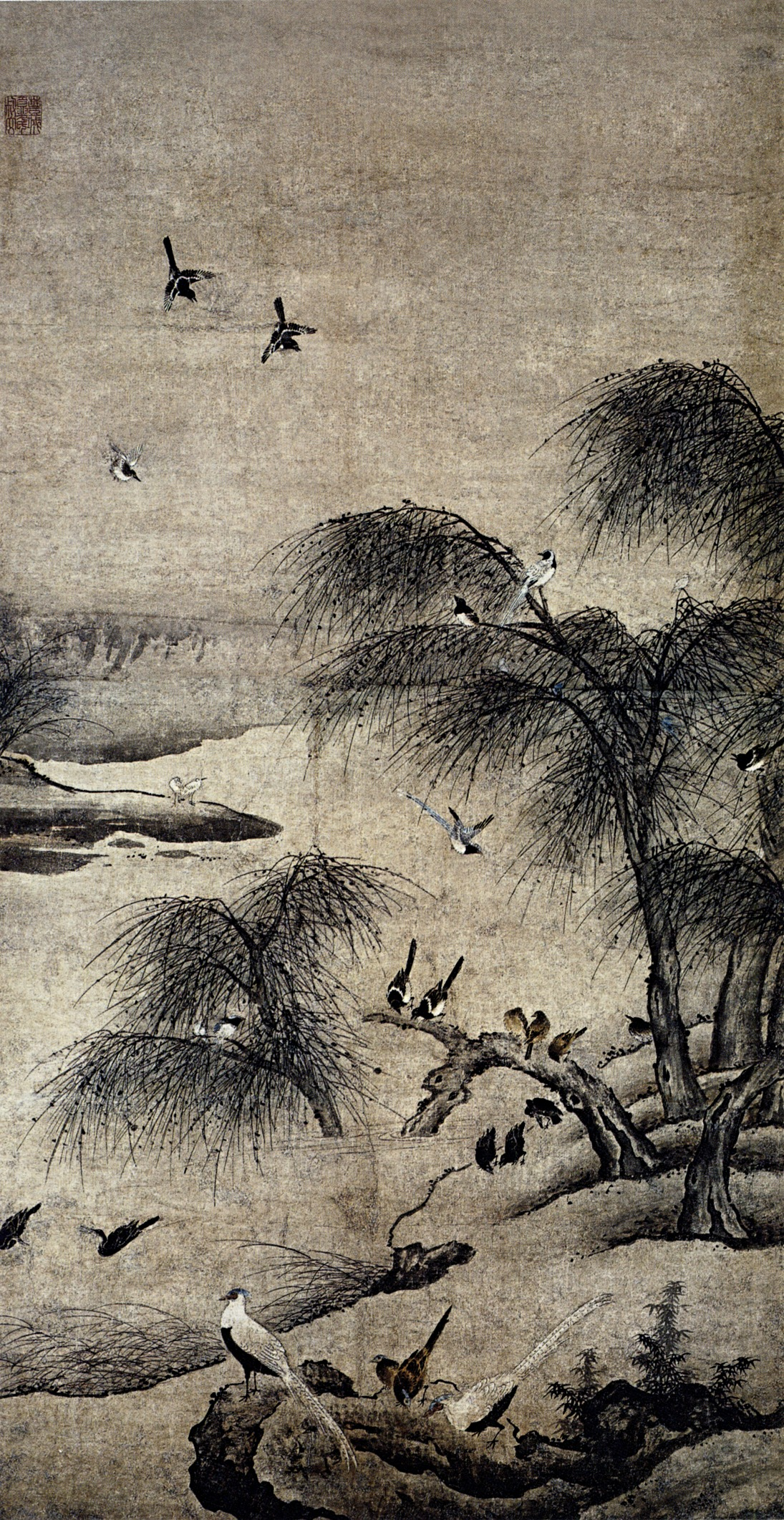
Xia Shuwen, Birds Flocking at a Willow Tree Embankment, Liaoning Provincial Museum

Xia Shuwen (Chinese: 夏叔文; pinyin: Xià Shūwén; Wade–Giles: Hsia Shu-wen); Date of birth unknown, was a Chinese painter during the early Ming dynasty (1368–1644).

Little is known of Xia's life other than he lived during the late Yuan and early Ming dynasties.
