= Zhang Shuqi =

American painter

Chang Shu-chi (Chinese: 張書旂; 1901 — 1957) was a Chinese painter from Zhejiang, noted for painting flowers and birds.

== Biography ==
He studied at Shanghai under Liu Haisu. For a time he taught at the National Center University. From 1942 to 1946, he lived in the United States. After that, he returned to China for a time, but ultimately settled in the US.

His works are held in the Art Gallery of Greater Victoria, the Ashmolean Museum and Stanford University.

He is the father of Gordon H. Chang, Professor of History at Stanford University.
