= Chen Lin (painter) =

Chinese painter during the Yuan dynasty

Chen Lin (simplified Chinese: 陈琳; traditional Chinese: 陳琳; pinyin: Chén Lín; Wade–Giles: Ch'en Lin; ca. 1260–1320) was a Chinese landscape painter during the Yuan Dynasty (1271–1368). His specific birth and death dates are not known.

Chen was born in Hangzhou in the Zhejiang province. His style name was 'Zhongmei'. Chen was instructed by Zhao Mengfu. He specialized in landscape, human figure, and bird-and-flower paintings, and his style utilized bold and vigorous strokes with light colors.

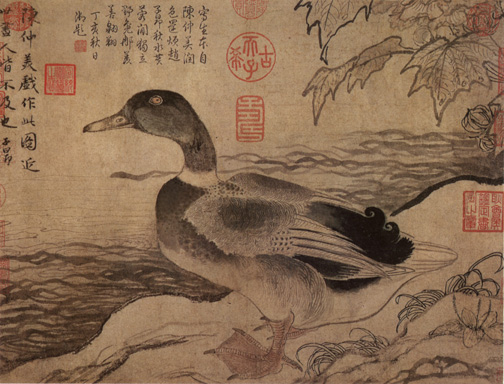
Chen Lin, Water Fowl, National Palace Museum
