= Lu Guang (painter) =

Chinese painter

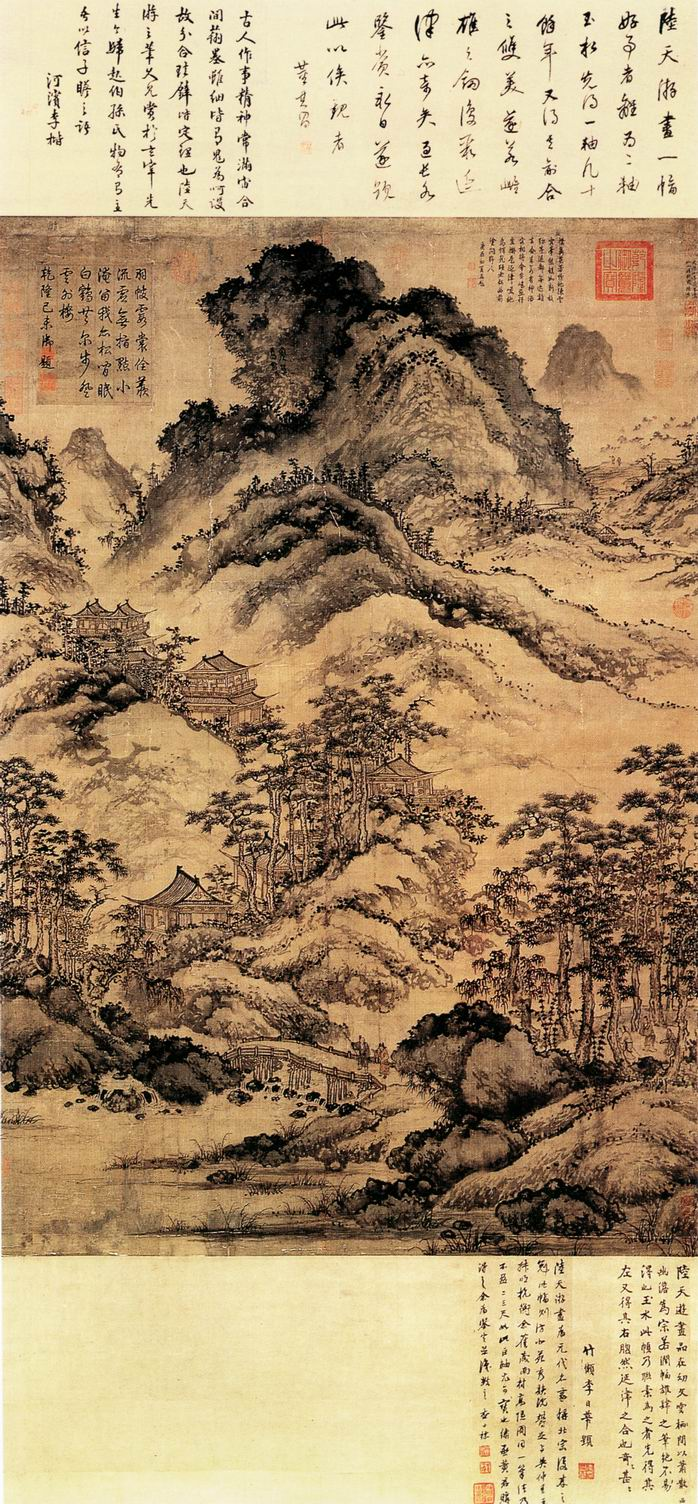
Lu Guang, View of Immortal Mountain Tower (仙山樓觀圖), National Palace Museum, Taipei

Lu Guang (simplified Chinese: 陆广; traditional Chinese: 陸廣; pinyin: Lù Guǎng; Wade–Giles: Lu Kuang); was a Chinese landscape painter and poet during the Yuan Dynasty (1271–1368). His specific birth and death dates are not known.

Lu was born in Suzhou in the Jiangsu province. His style name was 'Jihong' (季弘) and his pseudonym was 'Tian Yousheng' (天游生). Lu's painting followed the style of Huang Gongwang and Wang Meng.
