= Song Xu =

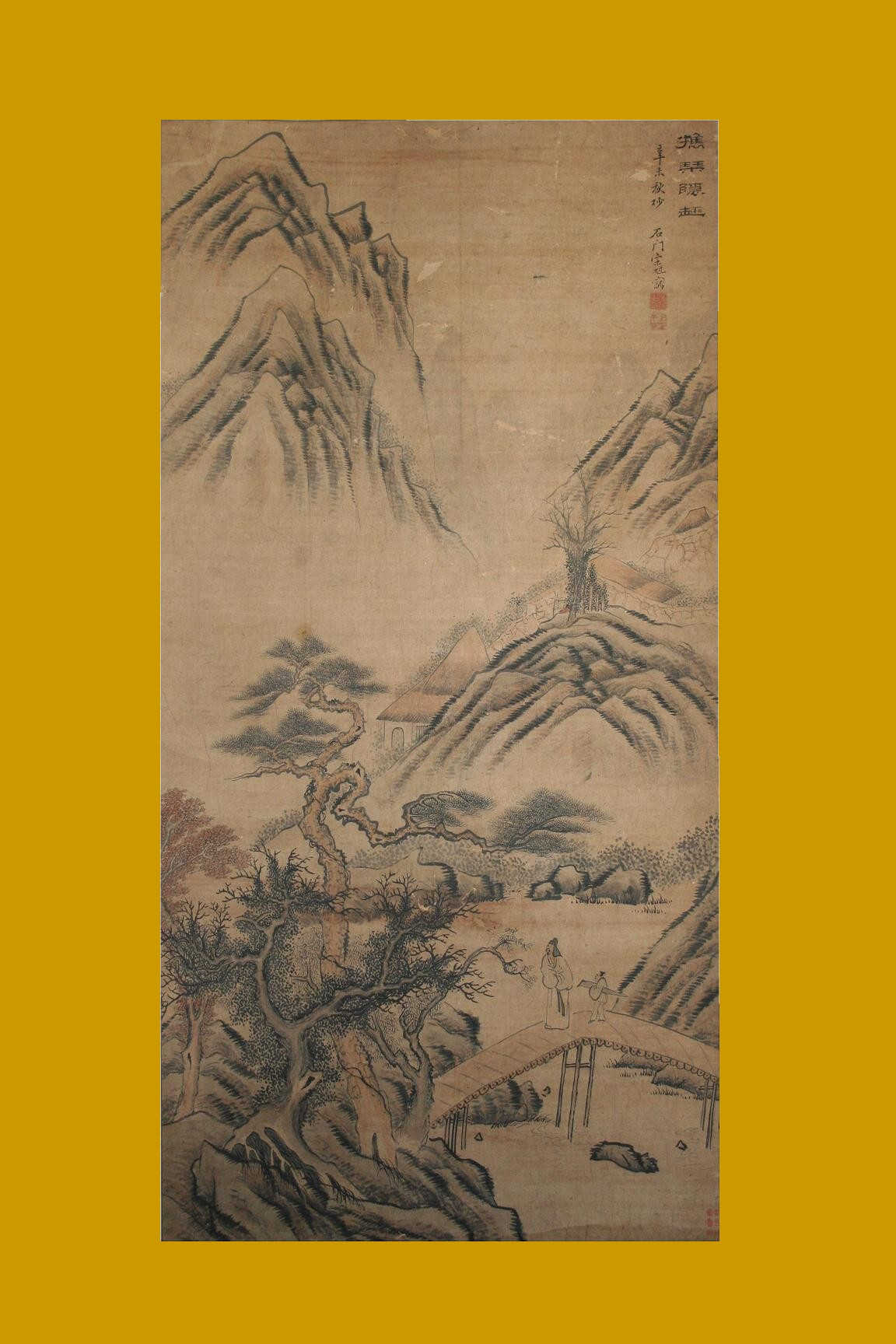
Nantoyōsō Collection, Japan

Song Xu (Chinese: 宋旭; pinyin: Sòng Xù; Wade–Giles: Sung Hsü, born 1525), was a Chinese landscape painter. His courtesy name was Chuyang (初炀) and pen name was Shimen (石门, "Stone Gate"). Song eventually became a Buddhist priest and adopted various religious names. He was, according to some sources from Jixing in Zhejiang province, but others assert that he was from Huzhou in Zhejiang Province.

Song was and extremely well read and well versed individual who was greatly influenced by Zen teaching. He was an expert landscapist, but also excelled at human figures. During the late 16th century, he traveled throughout China. A 1543 scroll shows his study of the Song period painter Xia Gui. He is said to have studied the works of the master artist Shen Zhou. Song's eccentric paintings are often characterized by inscriptions in characters of an archaic style. He was largely individualistic and independent, working for the most part outside the major painting schools of his age.

An extant painting of Buddhist Arhats bears a date of 1605. Other works show a still active painter at eighty-one.

== Eighteen Views of Huzhou ==
Inscription reads: Mt. Biyan: This mountain used to have a primeval forest, with a temple hidden within it. Now, those primeval forests have been wantonly and completely cut down. Consequently, with its devastated look, few travelers are coming. Still, with its peaks, cliffs, and waterfall, there is no lack of scenic beauty.

Song Xu's series Eighteen Views of Huzhou ('湖州十八景圖) was produced c. 1588. These annotated landscapes are of scenic locations renowned for their beauty around the city of Wuxing, southeastern China.

The album is held by The Cleveland Museum of Art.

== Gallery ==
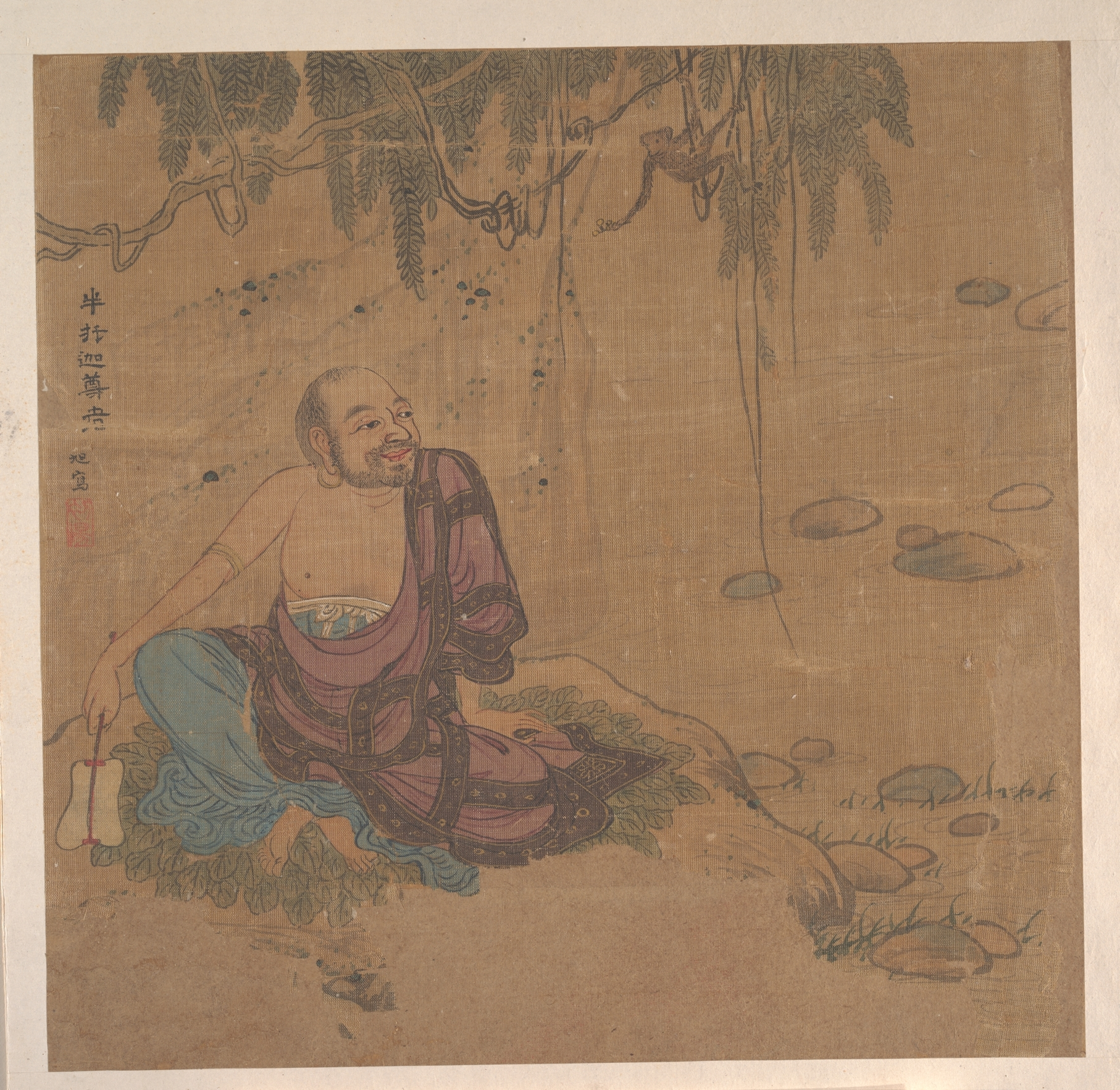

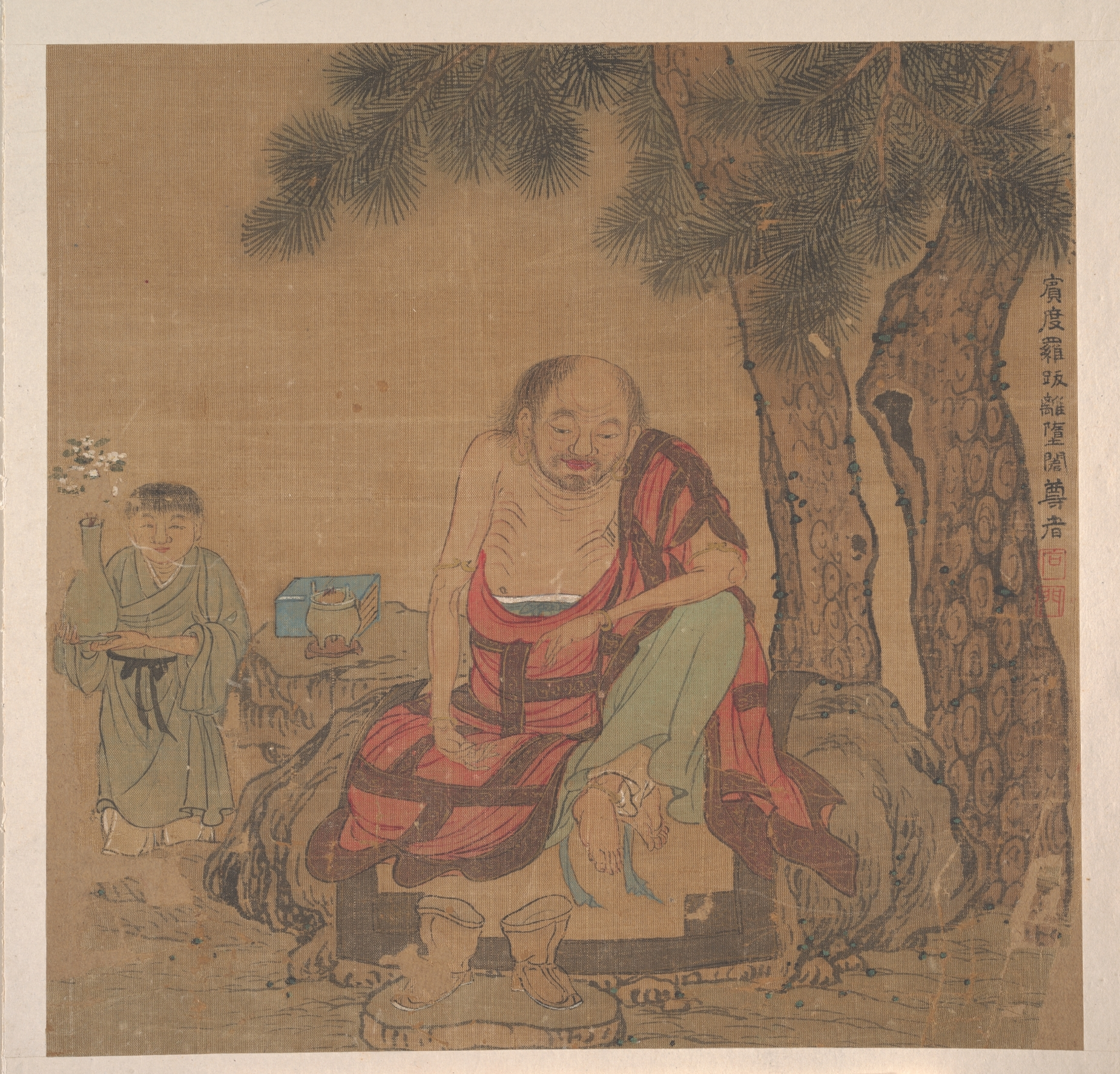

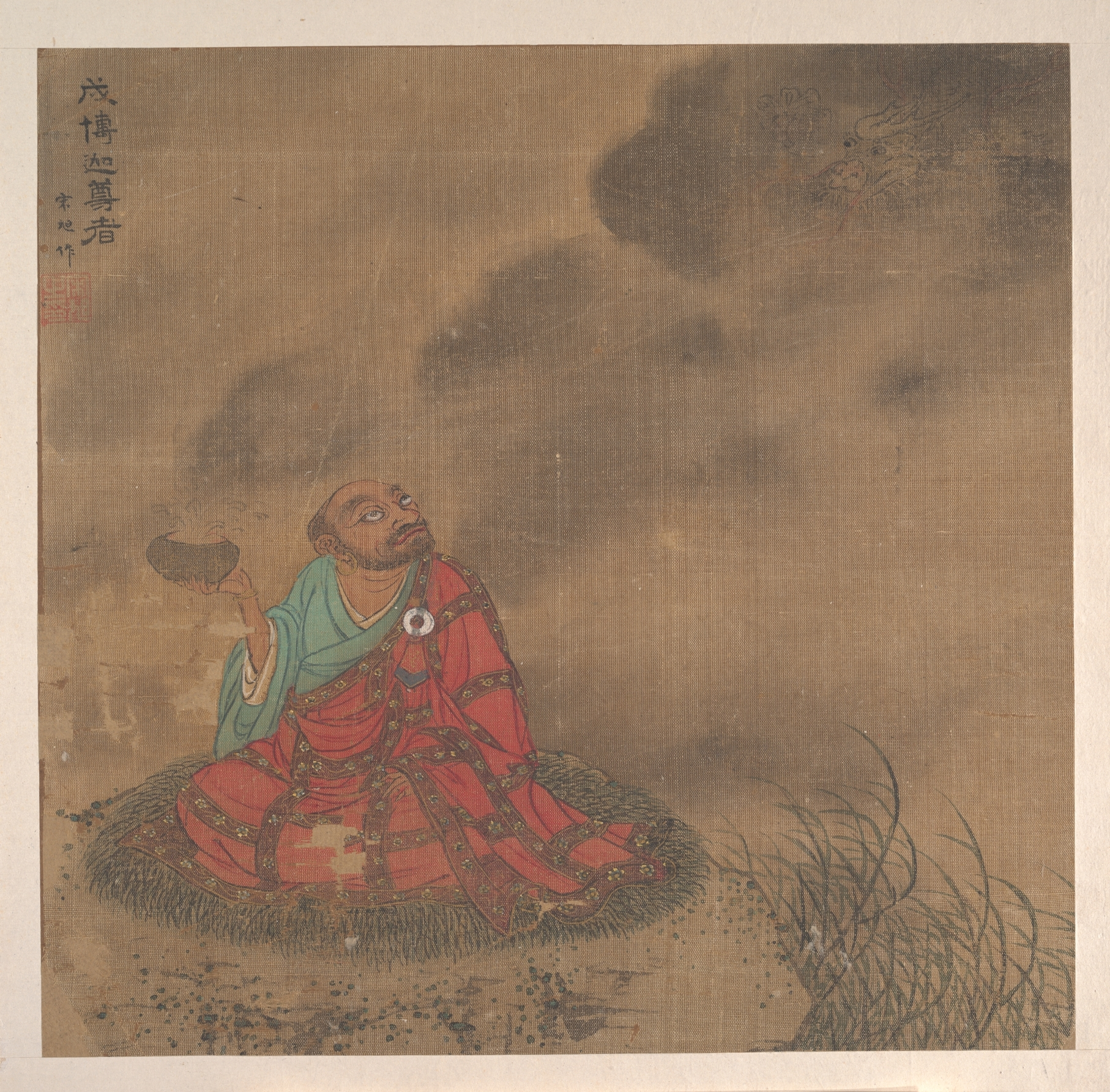

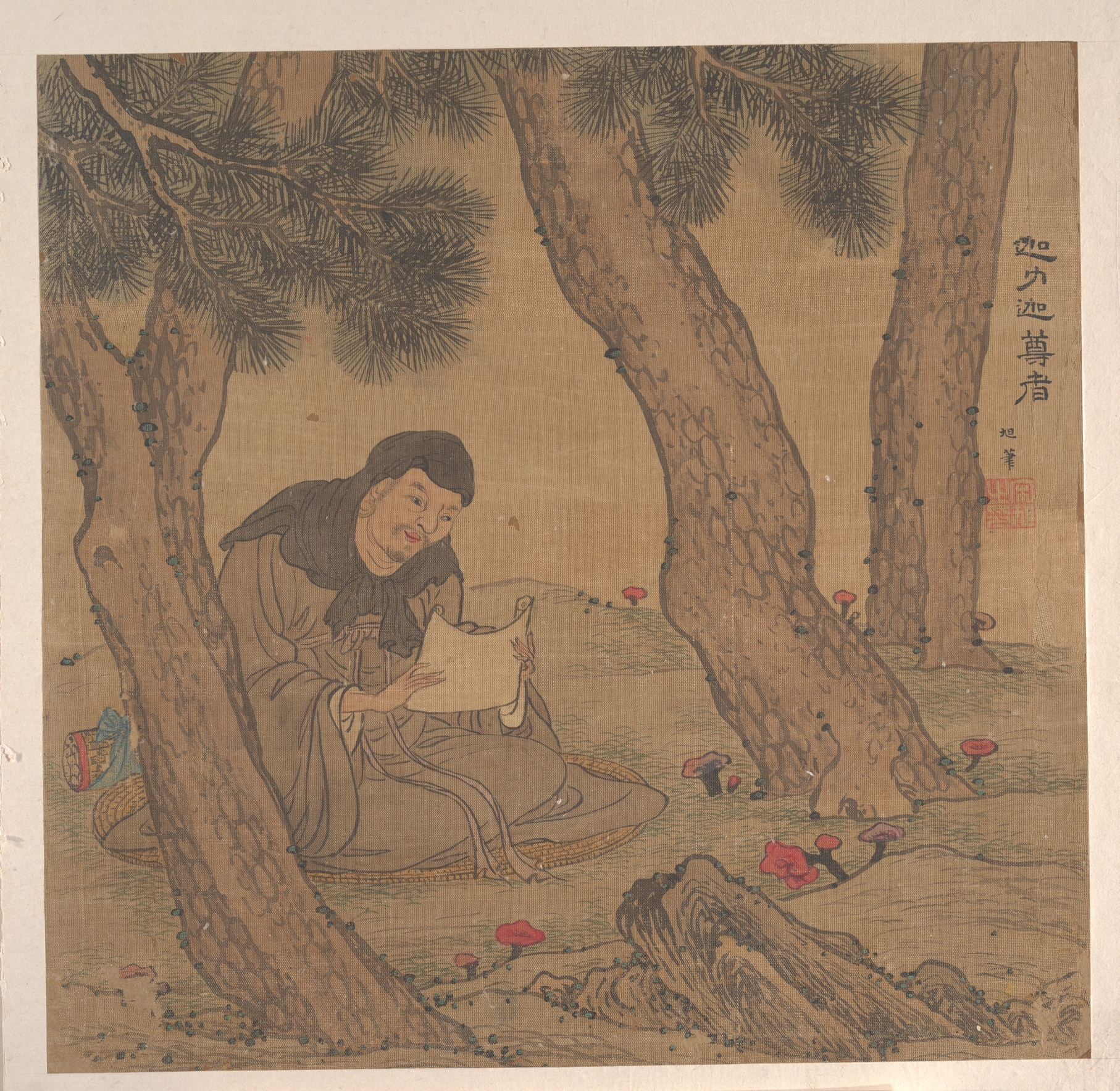
