= Li Fangying =

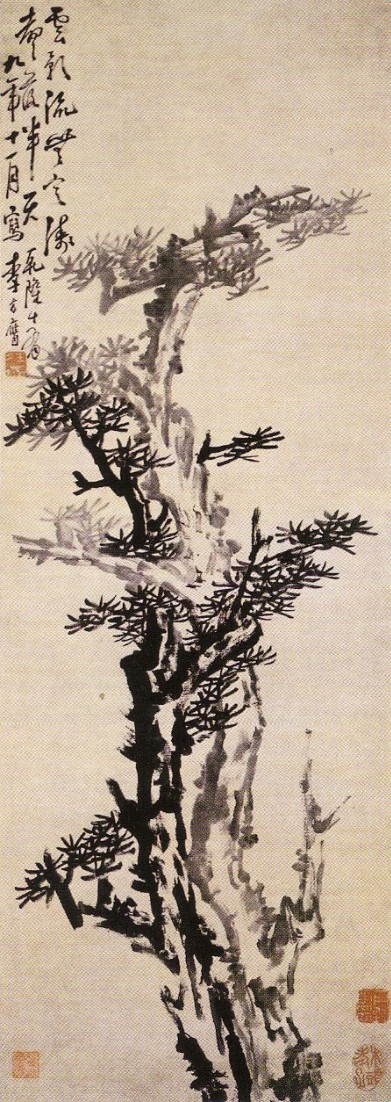
Old pines, ink on paper drawing by Li Fangying (1753) 123x43,6cm

Li Fangying 李方膺 (1696–1755) was a Qing Chinese painter from Jiangsu. He served as a county magistrate for 20 years. As a painter he is best known for painting plant imagery specifically pines, bamboos, plum blossoms and orchids. He was one of the Eight Eccentrics of Yangzhou.
