= Xie Sun =

Xie Sun (Hsieh Sun, traditional: 謝蓀, simplified: 谢荪); was a Chinese landscape painter during the Qing Dynasty (1644–1912 AD), one of the Eight Masters of Nanjing. His specific years of birth and death are not known.

Xie was born in the Jiangsu province. His style name was 'Yaoling'. Xie painted primarily landscapes and bird-and-flower paintings.
