= Zhao Yuan =

Chinese painter

Zhao Yuan (simplified Chinese: 赵原; traditional Chinese: 趙原; pinyin: Zhào Yuán; Wade–Giles: Chao Yüan) is a noted Chinese painter in late Yuan and early Ming Dynasty. His birth and death years are unknown. His courtesy name was Shanzhang (善长), and sobriquet Danlin (丹林). He was born in Ying Cheng (营城) (present day Yingxian (营县) of Shandong Province). He resided in Suzhou. His painting style most closely resembled that of Wang Meng. Existing works include 晴川送别 (Farewell on the Clear River) and 合溪草堂.
