= Xiao Yuncong =

Chinese landscape painter, calligrapher and poet

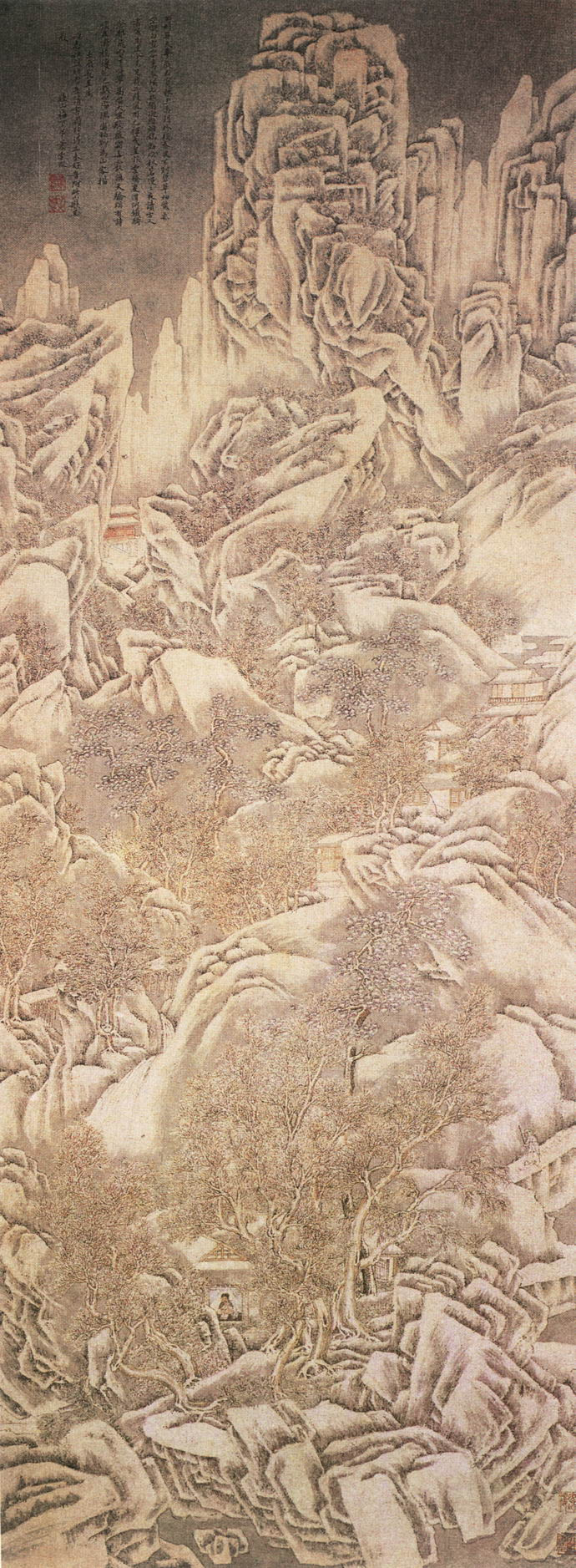
Reading in the Snowy Mountains (雪岳讀書). Hanging scroll, ink and color on paper. 79.8 x 40.4 cm. Palace Museum.

Xiao Yuncong (traditional Chinese: 蕭雲從; simplified Chinese: 萧云从; pinyin: Xiāo Yúncóng; Wade–Giles: Hsiao Yun-ts'ung; 1596–1673) was a Chinese landscape painter, calligrapher, and poet during the late Ming and early Qing dynasties.

Xiao was born in Wuhu in Anhui province, at that time part of Taiping Prefecture. His style name was 'Chimu' (尺木) and his pseudonym was 'Wumen Daoren' (無悶道人). Later in life he acquired the pseudonyms 'Zhongshan Laoren' (中山老人) and 'Anhui Wuhuren' (安徽蕪湖人). Xiao was known for his landscape paintings such as the Taiping shanshui tuhua (太平山水圖畫) which used dry and twisting brushstrokes called gui shu pai (姑熟派). He did not follow any previous artist's style. In calligraphy, he produced the work Mei Hua Tang Posthumous manuscript (梅花堂遺稿). He remained a lifelong Ming dynasty supporter.
