= Li Shida =

Chinese painter

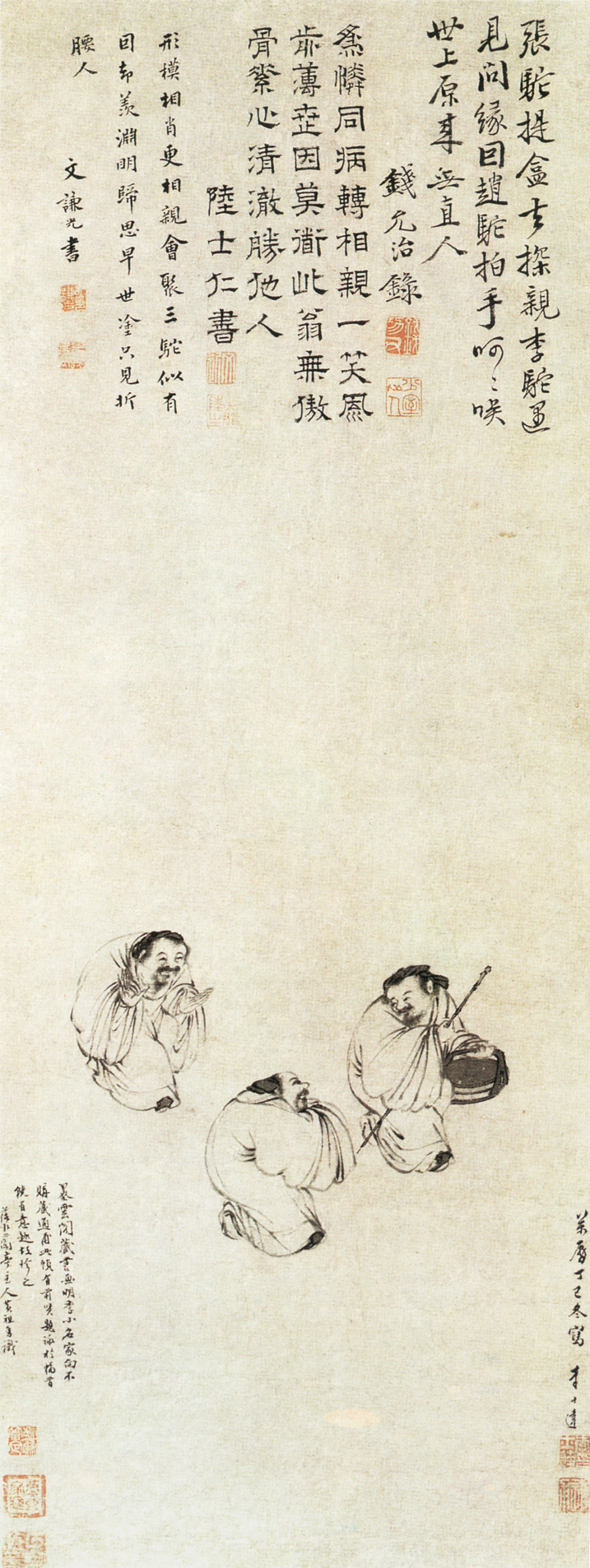
Three Hunchbacks (三驼图), Li Shida, Palace Museum, Beijing

Li Shida (simplified Chinese: 李士达; traditional Chinese: 李士達; pinyin: Lǐ Shìdá, c. 1540), was a Chinese painter of the Ming dynasty. A native of Suzhou, Jiangsu Province, he obtained the position of a jinshi in the imperial examination in 1574 during the reign of the Wanli Emperor.

== Biography ==
Li was born at a year around 1540. He grew up in Xingguo.

== Painting ==
Shida painted figures and landscape paintings. He also did flower painting (which he claimed he wasn't good at.

He wrote an essay on five qualities he believed helped him paint. He claimed they were ability, sincerity, rarity, depth and harmony.
