= Luo Zhichuan =

Yuan dynasty painter

Luo Zhichuan (Lo Chih-ch'uan, traditional: 羅稚川, simplified: 罗稚川); was a Chinese landscape painter during the Yuan Dynasty (1271–1368). His specific dates of birth and death are not known.

Luo was born in Qingjiang (modern Huai'an) in the province of Jiangxi. He established a reputation for himself very early on in school and went on to become very well known in his time. He painted landscapes in the style of Guo Xi.
