= Zhang Yin (painter) =

Zhang Ying (Chinese: 张崟; 1761–1829) was a calligrapher and painter of Qing Dynasty China. A native Dantu (now Zhenjiang, Jiangsu Province), he belonged to the Dantu School.

His style name was 'Bao Yan' and his sobriquet was 'Xi An'. He was talented in painting landscapes which were done with a desolated and free atmosphere.
