= Liu Jue =

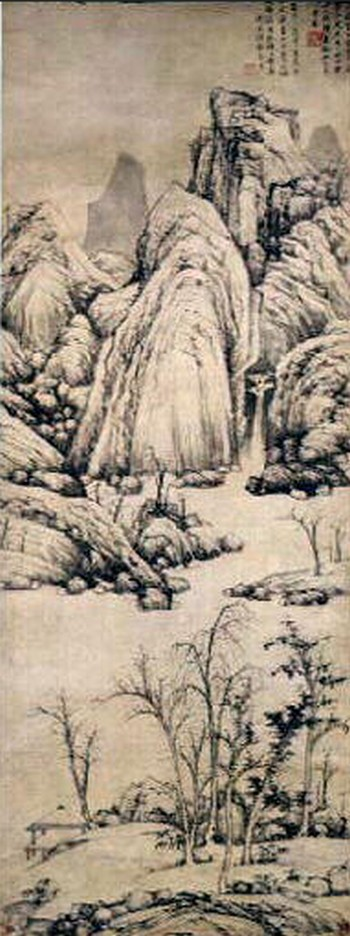
Landscape Mountain or Retreat in the Mountains by Liu Jue, Guimet Museum

Liu Jue (Liu Chüeh, traditional: 劉玨, simplified: 刘珏; c. 1409 – 1472) was a Chinese landscape painter, calligrapher, and poet during the Ming dynasty (1368–1644).

Liu was born in Changzhou in the Jiangsu province. His style name was 'Tingmei' and his sobriquet was 'Wan'an'. Liu's painting used a plump brush stroke style, which later influenced Shen Zhou.
