= Zhang Shunzi =

Chinese painter, calligrapher and poet

Zhang Shunzi (Chinese: 张舜咨) was a famed 14th-century Chinese painter, calligrapher, and poet in the Yuan Dynasty. He was born in Hangzhou, Zhejiang Province, though his birth and death years are unknown.

His style names were 'Shixie' and 'Shikui' (師夔), and his sobriquets were 'Lishan' (櫟山) and 'Zhe Zuiweng'. Zhang specialized in landscape and bamboo paintings, utilizing steady and bold brushstrokes. He also excelled in calligraphy, poetry and prose. He also served as county chief executive in Fujian Province in the Tianli era (1328-1330) of Emperor Wenzong of the Yuan Dynasty.
