= Bamboo in the Four Seasons =

Tosa School Painting of Bamboo

- 伝土佐光信筆 四季竹図屏風 (Japanese)
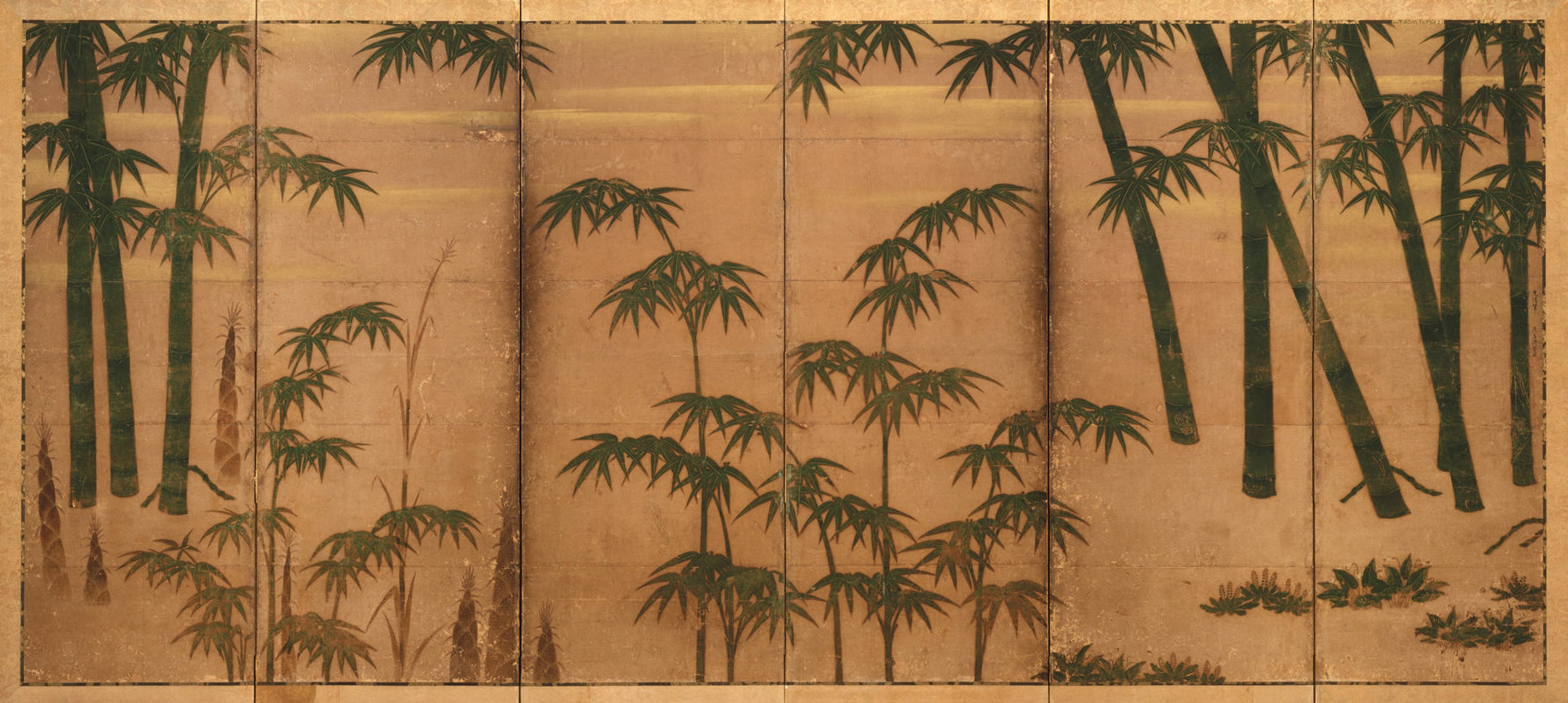
- Artist: attributed to Tosa Mitsunobu; Tosa school
- Year: 15th century
- Medium: folding screen
- Movement: Tosa school
- Subject: Bamboo in different stages of growth thru the seasons
- Dimensions: 157 cm × 360 cm (62 in × 140 in)
- Location: Metropolitan Museum of Art, New York City
- Owner: Metropolitan Museum of Art
- Accession: 1975.268.44, .45
- Website: https://www.metmuseum.org/art/collection/search/45258

Bamboo in the Four Seasons is a late 15th century Japanese folding screen painting spanning six panels, attributed to Tosa Mitsunobu, but definitively within the Tosa school.

Depicting bamboo at different stages of growth throughout the seasons, the piece presents a transitory state, both of the plant, the seasons, as well as that of the evolution of the Tosa school and Muromachi period styles, which adapted the bamboo motif from previous Chinese paintings.

It is currently owned by the Metropolitan Museum of Art since 1975.

== Description ==
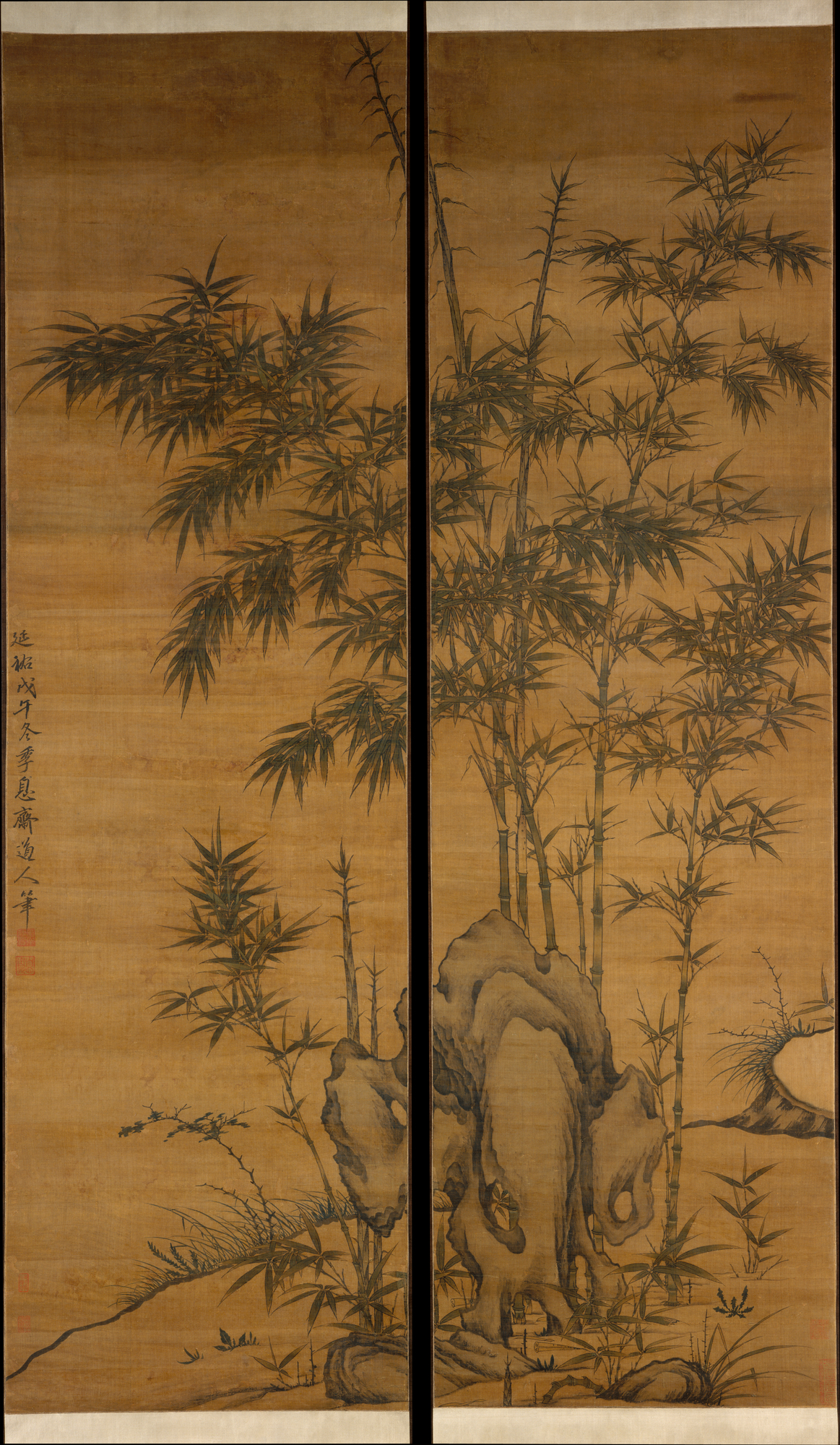
Bamboo and Rocks, Li Kan (1318), Metropolitan Museum of Art

Bamboo painting has been a common motif in Chinese painting from the Song and Yuan dynasty, depicted through paintings by Emperor Huizong in the 12th century.

One such prominent figure in bamboo painting was Li Kan, whose paintings gained prominence as he joined the Yuan Court, and as such wrote treatises on how to paint bamboo.

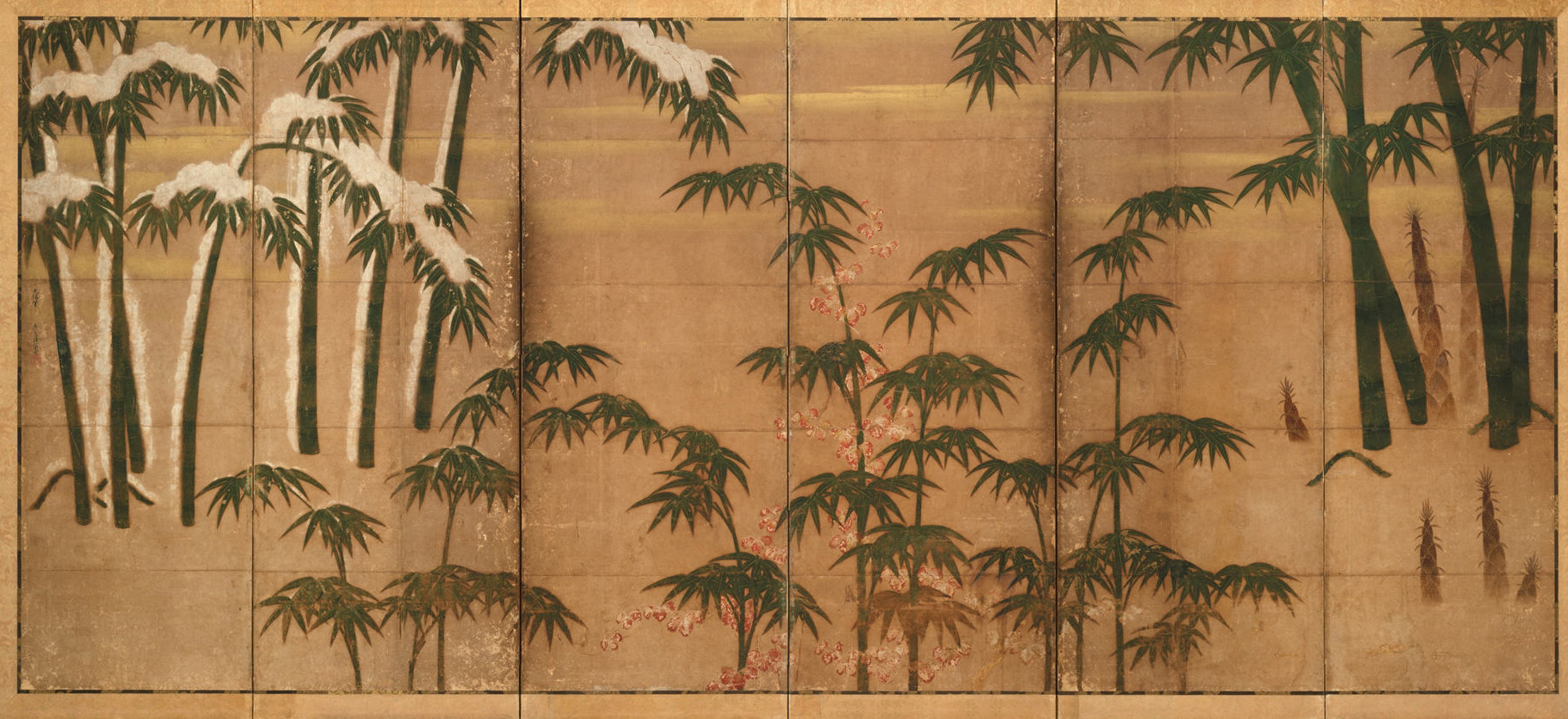
Second panel

His style was passed on to his son Li Shixing (1283-1328). Within the first half of the 14th century, intellectual exchange between the Chinese Zen and the Japanese Zen schools intensified, which included the importation, followed by evolution of the painting style amongst the Muromachi elite.

The prominence of an independent style in Japan grew more prominent after the Heian period, with the emergence of Yamato-e, of which the Tosa school became renowned for, while maintaining infusion of ideas from China, a style known as kara-e. Bamboo in the Four Seasons is seen as an early-stage work by the Tosa School.

Japanese influences on Bamboo in the Four Seasons, depicts the transitory state of bamboo growth, from shoots to mature plant in the same space, from spring to winter, seen from right to left, the gold leaf backdrop conveying the concept of space. Impermanence and cycles is a prominent theme by showcasing the life cycle, adapted from Shinto and Buddhist precepts.

Over the course of centuries, the Tosa school's aesthetics would be studied and give way to Rinpa school in the Edo period.

== Provenance ==
The time period of Bamboo in the Four Seasons is contemporary to that of the career of Tosa Mitsunobu (1434-1525), though it is uncertain if the painting is attributed to him, even though it was made by the Tosa School.

Efforts to construct the evolution and influences of Tosa school is only recent in scope.

The folding screen would have been a subject of study during the Azuchi–Momoyama and Edo period, thru open study by independent painters, machi-eshi (townsman painters). Observation and study would give way and influence towards Rinpa style, with prominent artists including Tawaraya Sōtatsu.

Owned previously by Yabumoto Shōgorō of Osaka, Bamboo in the Four Seasons would be acquired by art collector Harry G.C. Packard, who would then gift the painting to the MET in 1975. As of today, the panels are under designated accession number 1975.268.44,45.

Prominently rotated as part of MET's permanent collection, the painting has seen special exhibition at the Tokyo Metropolitan Teien Art Museum to commemorate the 500th anniversary of Osaka Castle from October–November 1986, as well as an exhibit at the Cleveland Museum of Art on 16th-century Japanese art in October–December 1991.
