= Li Kan =

Li Kan may refer to:

- Li Kan (painter) (李衎), Yuan dynasty painter
- Li Kan (李堪), Eastern Han dynasty warlord who was involved in the Battle of Tong Pass (211)
- Li Kan (李戡, born 1992), son of Li Ao
