= Tosa Mitsuoki =

Japanese painter

- 土佐光起
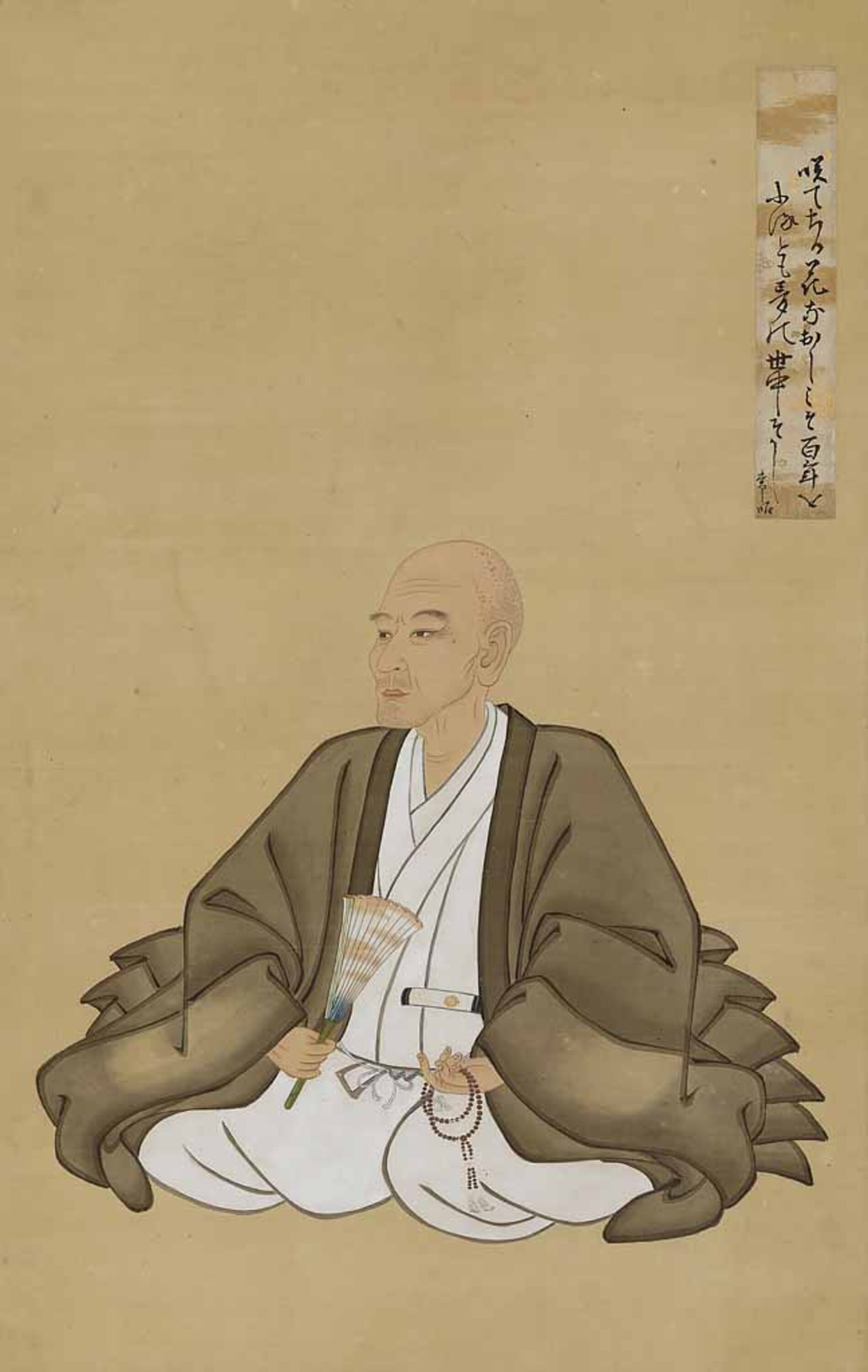
- Painting of Tosa Mitsuoki by Tosa Mitsunari in the Kyoto National Museum

edokoro azukari, Head Imperial Court Painter
- In office 1654–1681
- Preceded by: Tosa Mitsunori
- Succeeded by: Tosa Mitsunari

Personal details
- Born: 21 November 1617 Sakai, Izumi
- Died: 14 November 1691 (aged 73) Kyoto, Japan
- Children: Tosa Mitsunari; Tosa Mitsuchika
- Parent: Tosa Mitsunori (father)

Tosa Mitsuoki (土佐 光起; November 21, 1617 – November 14, 1691) was a Japanese painter.

Tosa Mitsuoki succeeded his father, Tosa Mitsunori (1583–1638), as head of the Tosa school and brought the Tosa school to Kyoto after around 50 years in Sakai. When the school was settled in Sakai, Mitsunori painted for townsmen. The school was not as prolific as it once was when Mitsunobu, who painted many fine scrolls (1434–1525) ran the school. Mitsuoki moved out of Sakai with his father, in 1634 and into the city of Kyoto. There, he hoped to revive the Tosa school to gain status back into the Kyoto court. Around the time of 1654 he gained a position as court painter (edokoro azukari) that had for many years traditionally been held by the Tosa family, but was in possession of the Kano school since the late Muromachi period (1338–1573).

== Restoring the Tosa School ==
In 1634, Mitsuoki relocataed from Sakai, Osaka prefecture to the capitol at the behest of Emperor Go-Mizunoo. Mitsunori began painting ceremonial fans sensu for the court. In 1654, Mitsuoki succeeded his father, Tosa Mitsunori, when he was elevated to the title of the edokoro azukari, "head of the Imperial court painting bureau". The Tosa-ha prospered throughout the Edo period, during the years of 1600 to 1868. Tosa school works were again favored by the Kyoto elites at court. Showing influence form Chinese paintings and echoing stylistic choices of the Kano School, Mitsuoki's painting style deviated more so from Tosa style traditions than his predecessors granting him a wider audience of appeal to the changing art tastes of the imperial court. Mitsuoki descendants succeeded him in his role as edokoro azukari, starting with his son, Tosa Mitsunari (1646–1710). Many of the successors used the same techniques and style of painting as Mitsuoki, this lack of innovation by Mitsuoki's successors produced many works that could be misappropriated to Mitsuoki. This lack of adaption to the continuously evolving 17th century Japanese culture lead to the gradual disinterest in the family's work and its eventual die out in the nineteenth century. In 1690, Mitsuoki contributed to The Authoritative Summary of the Rules of Japanese Painting, Honchou gahou daiden (本朝画法大伝) a book detailing many Tosa painting techniques that had been traditionally handed down orally.

== The Art Workshop ==
The court and political affiliated art school practices of historical Japan are far different than their contemporary counterparts in Europe and America, but more akin to a family craft, business, or workshop than academic institution where any person may apply and learn the trade. Many practices flourished during the Edo period, imploring different understandings of Japanese customs and Chinese artistic learning. Each school's practice was a closely guarded secret traditionally passed down orally or in short written documents from master to student. Unfortunately due to a multitude of circumstances many of these documents being lost or destroyed, there exists a limited wealth of written documentation. What little scattered and incomplete documentation that still exists is in the form of personal diaries, nikki, lists, letters, and inscriptions on artworks themselves. For many art workshops, labor would be divided based on seniority and skill, with the head of the workshop acting as a quasi-middleman between the aristocratic commissioner and the various craftsmen employed by the workshop; fulfilling the role of commissioner, preservationist and restorationist, appraiser, and official channel of communications.

== After death ==
The later Tosa style of the eighteenth century showed very little strength or promise due to loss of patrons and overshadowing from the Kanō school. The school was affected by the growing popularity of the study of Japanese history and the rise of the imperial family. Around the nineteenth century, there was a distinct revival under two artist named Tanaka Totsugen and Reizei Tamechika who specialized in repeating Mitsuoki's work. Their work reaffirmed the Japanese spirit of Yamato-e, which they made many copies. Their art reflected political philosophy and sometimes had a historical connecting because several of the artists were also faithful to the imperial cause. The two artists were revivalists, and got so caught up in painting historical figures, that they overlooked the special greatness of the early artists who specialized in movement and realism. The most successful successors invented their own artistic style but kept the predecessors tradition of painting in strong color with an intense feeling of natural beauty.

== Style ==
Mitsuoki reinvigorated the Yamato-e(大和絵) style of classical Japanese painting. Yamato-e originated from interest in reproducing early Tang dynasty (AD 618–907) paintings, and was later reinvented and further refined to fit Japanese cultural perceptions in the late Heian period (794-1185). Yamato-e, sometimes referred to as wa-e or kazu-e (和絵) had become synonymous with the Tosa-ha by the Muromachi period as a way for Japanese artist to distinguish their works from those of mainland Chinese paintings, kara-e (唐絵). Yamato-e incorporated various visual and literary techniques for establishing narrative. Works were not always accompanied with text and may rely on heavily on period specific visual motifs, icons, and symbols to relay a story or theme. Tosa style by the time of Mitsuoki focused heavily on depicting themes of plants and nature, famous places, meisho-e (名所絵), the four seasons, shiki-e (四季絵), bird-and-flower, kachō-e (花鳥絵). Many of these popular symbols and icons from mimicking Chinese practices, treating the original Chinese masterwork as a sort of prototype to improve upon. Popular formats for Mitsuoki's pictures were wall scrolls kakemono (掛け物), or handscrolls (emakimono) that would be read from right to left with the accompanied story, sliding doors fusuma and folding screen panels byobu that featured up to six panels. Mitsuoki's style incorporated the depth and calligraphy techniques of ink wash brushwork similar to Song dynasty (AD 960–1279) and Yuan dynasty (AD 1271–1368) Chinese court paintings, used cartoon-like sketch linework, innovation of historical designs, and excellent execution of decorative elements. With the great shifts to Japanese cultural and social structures over the two hundred and fifty-odd years, new art schools and practices arose that the recently popular revival of the Tosa had to contend with. The new influences such as the Kano style and Ukiyo-e, with their reimaging of birds, beasts, and the plant life of Japan can be seen influencing Tosa Mitsuoki's practice.

It is easy to see the drastic shift of Mitsuoki's artistic practice when put in comparison with his father, Mitsunori, and fellow contemporary Kano-he artist, Kano Tan'yu. Here we are better able to see how Mitsuoki uses void between defining figures, with tonal washes of color only being broken by equally formless instances of gold leaf hinting at an obscuring fog. Here, the fog's nature acts similar to the curtain and delineates the dreamscape of The Tale of Genji from the viewer's reality much more effectively than the frame-like mist of Mitsunori's interpretation. Mitsuoki's space is voluminous, much like that of Kano Tan'yu's Phoenixes by Paulownia Trees. The sparseness of objects grounding Mitsuoki's space invites the viewer to wonder among the ambiguous vastness of the space; where as Mitsunori's work does not cause this sharing of reality and treats the viewer as if they are watching through a window. Mitsuoki's clouds feel as though they could be dispersed and reveal hidden figures.
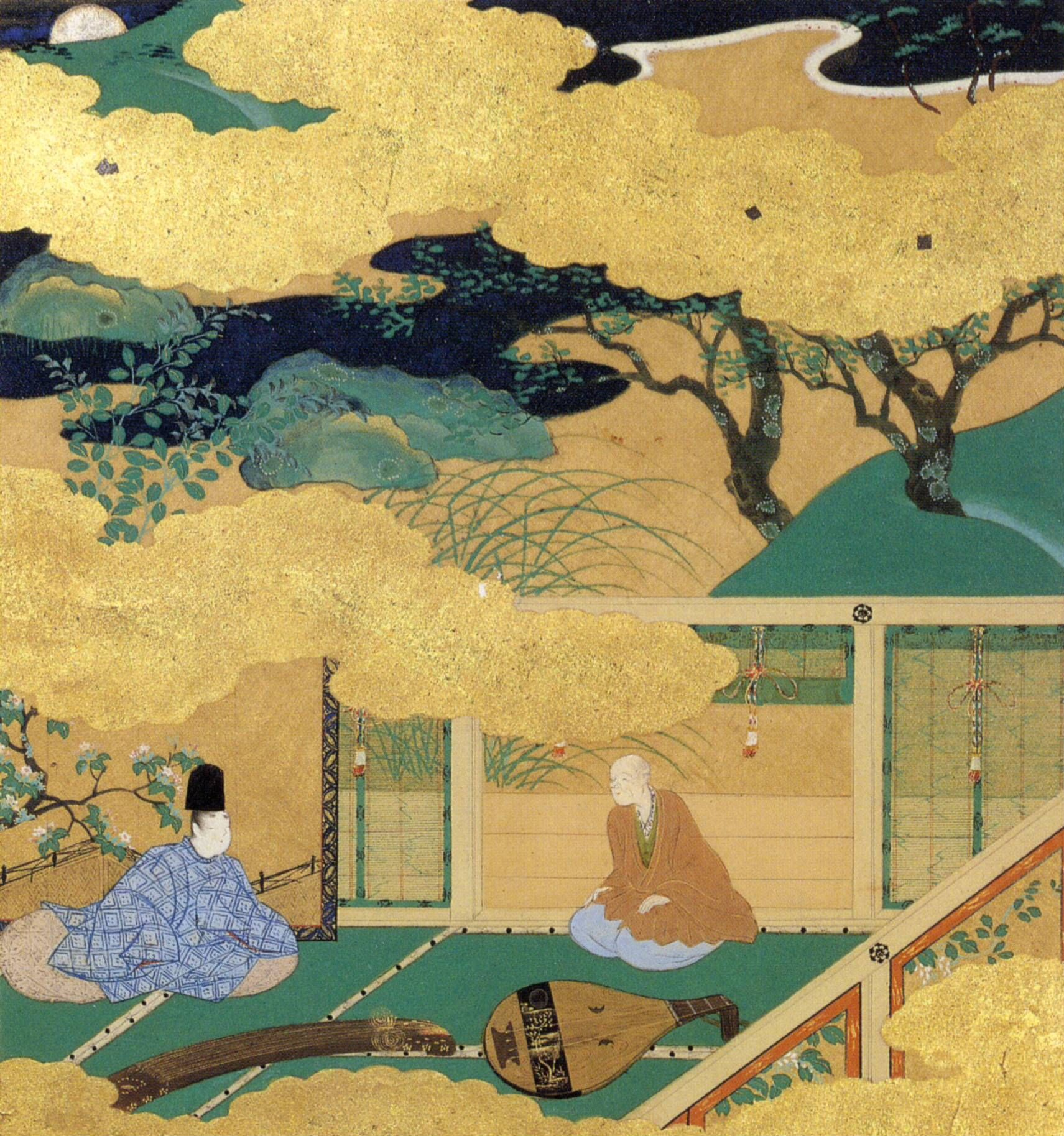
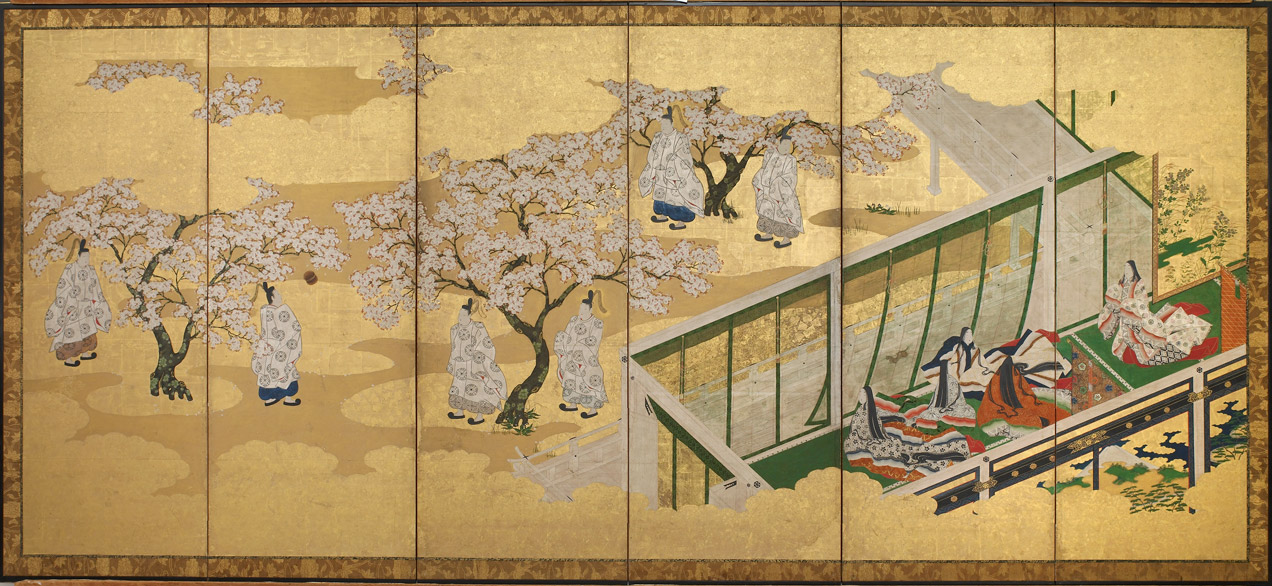
Tosa Mitsunori	Tosa Mitsuoki	Kano Tan'yu
Tosa Mitsunori Genji-Monogatari Detail	Kashiwagi, Genji monogatari, Tosa Mitsuoki	Kano Tan'yu - Phoenixes by Paulownia Trees - Google Art Project

One of the best Yamato-e painters of the time was Mitsuoki. His paintings reintroduced subject matter into the arts. His urbanized surroundings heavily influenced his style, with a wide angle of art ranging from "Quails and Flowers", to tree and scenery paintings on gold leaf screens. Mitsuoki reinstated the Tosa school style by incorporating the space and light touch somewhat similar to the earlier Song dynasty and Yuan dynasty (AD 960–1279) Chinese court paintings. He also put greater stress on ink brushwork. Mitsuoki had a style that was decorative, refined, and precise all at the same time, and throughout his career he maintained a consistent delivery. The birds and the landscapes were soft and delicate lines formed some inspiring pieces filled with beauty. His light-hearted linework, originality of design, and excellent execution, Mitsuoki combined tones which were bright without hardness, sometimes with touches of gold forming a harmony of color that was hard to find in his era. He became one of the most renowned Japanese exponents of bird-and-flower (kachō) painting in the Chinese court manner and is especially noted in his precise depictions of quail. His flower pieces were elegant, and given some tender sediment. Mitsuoki's sternness of his older style, never lost its dignity, but gained gentleness and tranquility. The Emperor, nobles and rich families collected and preserved his books.

== Works ==
Title	Technique	Format	Dimensions(cm)	Signature	Year	Current location	image
Quail and Millet	Ink and Color on Silk	Hanging scroll	124.14 × 69.85 × 2.54 cm	Tosa sakon shogen Mitsuoki	17th Century	Dallas Museum of Art	
Ono no Komachi	Ink and Color on Silk	Hanging scroll	73.3 x 31.3	Tosa sakon shogen Mitsuoki	17 Century		
Ishiyama-dera engi emaki		4 parts			1655-81	Ishiyama-dera	
Song of Twelve months	Ink and color on silk	2 part scroll	Volume 1 29.0x665.0 Volume 2 29.0x663.5		1664-68	Tokyo National Museum	
Egrets and Cotton Roses	Ink and Color	Hanging scroll	118.5 × 56.3	Tosa sakon shogen Mitsuoki hitsu	17th Century	Metropolitan Museum of Art	MET DP700742
Portrait of Hojo Ujinaga	Ink and Color on paper	Hanging scroll	127.2x56.4		1670-81	Detroit Institute of Arts	Mitsuoki Tosa - Portrait of Hojo Ujinaga - 2013.71 - Detroit Institute of Arts
Toyotomi Hideyoshi portrait	Ink and color	Hanging scroll	75.2x31.5	Tosa sakon shogen Mitsuoki hitsu	17th Century	Taigan Historical Museum, Sun Collection	
Sakaorimiya Renga		Scroll		Tosa sakon shogen Mitsuoki hitsu	17th Century	Yamanashi Prefectural Museum	
Genji Monogatari Folding Screen	Ink and Color	6 panel folding screen	100.7x286.0 (panel)		17th Century	Tokyo National Museum	Ch42 nioumiya
Mushrooms Skewered on Bamboo Twig	Ink and Color on Silk	Hanging scroll		Tosa sakon shogen Mitsuoki hitsu	17th Century	British Museum	
Yashima Uji River Hejian screen	Ink and Color	6 panel folding screen	155.1x365.4 (panel)		17th Century	Tokyo National Museum	
Album of Thirty six Immortal Poets	Ink and Color	booklet	17.5x15.4 (panel)		17th Century	The University Art Museum - Tokyo University of the Arts	
Flowering Cherry and Autumn Maples with Poem Slips	Ink and color, Gold and Silver	2 x 6 Panel Folding screens	144x286 (panel)	Tosa sakon shogen Mitsuoki hitsu	1654-81	Art Institute of Chicago	Tosa Mitsuoki - Flowering Cherry and Autumn Maples with Poem Slips - Google Art Project

== The Tosa school ==
The Tosa school, in its own history, expressly stated that the school founded in the ninth century owed nothing to the influence of China. But the style of the Tosa school looks like it was greatly influenced by Chinese painting. Apart from religious subjects, it occupied a special position in art specializing in the taste of the Court of Kyoto. Quails and Peacocks, cherry tree branches in flower, cocks and hens, Daimyōs with their samurai in gorgeous ceremonial costumes, were painted as time went on with extreme care and patience and attention to detail. As the years went on, their style became more and more precise, almost down to a science. The Tosa painters towards the end of their popularity, lost much of their prestige to artists of the later Kanō school, whose studies included a wider scope and bigger variety of subject matter. The paintings of the Tosa school were distinguished by the elegance and precision of its design, while their counterparts, the Kanō school, was well known for its power and freedom of design.

=== Tosa school and Kanō school ===
If the past works of the Tosa school and Kanō school are closely observed, there is clear proof that both of the traditional schools have a similar way of handling their draftsmanship. Both were patronized from the Japanese courts around the same time period, and specialized in Yamato-e and ukiyo-e paintings. At the same time, they both served different uses within the Edo court. Kanō painters were usually commissioned to paint the screens and hanging scrolls displayed in official audience halls and other public spaces in shōgun and daimyō residences where men gathered and intermixed. The courtly style of the Tosa artists, on the other hand, was usually deemed more appropriate for the decorations of the private rooms occupied by women and children and for the albums and scrolls that were often included in weddings. However, there was a clear stylistic relationship among the members of the two schools.

Not just the artwork was similar between the Tosa school and the Kanō school, the family line between the two has even been crossed at one time. The daughter of Tosa Mitsunobu married Kanō Motonobu. After the decline in popularity of the Tosa school during Mitsumochi's period (1496–1559), the Kano school overshadowed it and the Tosa school's artists usually worked under Kano school artists, sometimes helping sketch out final pieces for Kanō artists. The lack of innovation in the Tosa school style made a disconnection with the Japanese public because it did not capture the peoples hopes and dreams.

== Arts in Edo during Mitsuoki's life ==
After Tokugawa Ieyasu established Edo, the city went into a long period of isolation. The third shōgun of Tokugawa, shut off Japan from the world to make his hold more secure, besides very limited contacts at the port of Nagasaki. Differences of opinion among the Christian missionaries who had been in Japan for nearly a century helped to bring about the exclusionist policy which at around 1637, closed Japan to all foreign interaction. During this time, Edo Japan flourished into a very political economic and artistic center of Japan. It slowly grew to be one of the largest cities of the world, and its art in many ways showed the spirit of the new and boisterous metropolis. This is when Edo saw an emerging middle class. Fortunately the activities of each class, as long as they did not seem to conflict with the prestige of the higher-ranked military clans, were allowed to develop their own social styles and culture. Before this, the arts were usually reserved for the upper class and the more fortunate courts. Artists were not under the Kyoto courts pressure to produce work only for the higher class. In the "floating world", artists were free to select their own style and even their own target audience. With this, arose new types of art appropriate to the interests of merchants and the middle class. Art was no longer reserved for the elite class, now it belonged to whoever could afford it. The Shōgun of Edo and the Kyoto court continued to support the Tosa school as well as the other prominent school of the time, such as the Kano school.

== Ancestry ==
Fujiwara Yukimitsu (藤原 行光) (fl. 1352–1389) Founder of the Tosa-ha.
Fujiwara Yukihiro, Tosa Shogen (藤原 行広) (fl. 1406–1434)
Mitsunobu (光信) (1434–1525) 11th Generational Head of Family.
Mitsumochi (光茂) (1496 – ca.1559) 12th Generational Head of Family.
Mitsumoto (光元) (fl. 1530–1569) 13th Generational Head of Family.
Mitsuyoshi (光吉) (1539–1613) 14th Generational Head of Family.
Mitsunori (光則) (1583–1638) 15th Generational Head of Family.
Mitsuoki (光起) (1617–1691) 16th Generational Head of Family.
Mitsunari (光成) (1646–1710) 17th Generational Head of Family.

== Bibliography and references ==
- Gerhart, Karen M. The Eyes of Power: Art and Early Tokugawa Authority. Honolulu: University of Hawaii Press, 1999.
- Guth, Christine. Art of Edo Japan the Artist and the city, 1615–1868. New York: H.N. Abrams, 1996.
- Guth, Christine. The Tokugawa as patrons and collectors, in The Japan of Shoguns: The Tokugawa Collection. Montreal, Quebec, Canada: Montreal Museum of Fine Arts, 1989.
- Lillehoj, Elizabeth. Acquisition: Art and Ownership in Edo-Period Japan. Warren, CT: Floating World Editions Inc, 2007. 9, 172.
- Lillehoj, Elizabeth, Screech, Timon. "Owning Edo-Period Paintings". Acquisition: Art and Ownership in Edo-Period Japan. Warren, CT: Floating World Editions Inc, 2007. 23–51.
- Paine, Robert T. The Pelican History of Art. Penguin Books, 1975.
- Watson, Professor William. The Great Japan Exhibition: Art of The Edo Period 1600–1868. Royal Academy of Arts/Weidenfeld & Nicolson, 1981.
- Minamoto, H. An Illustrated History of Japanese Art. Japan: Kyoto K. Hoshino, 1935.
- Munsterberg, Hugo. Arts of Japan An Illustrated History. Boston: Tuttle Publishing, 1957.
- Swann, Peters C. An Introduction to the Arts of Japan. 15 West 47th Street, New York, New York: Frederick A. Praeger, inc.
- Tosa school (Japanese painting) (Britannica Online Encyclopedia).
- Ueda, Makoto. Literary and Art Theories in Japan. Chapter 9: "In Search of the Lifelike: Mitsuoki on the Art of Painting". Ann Arbor: University of *Michigan Center for Japanese Studies, 1991.
- Fumiko, Cranston, “Translation of Waka Poems on Tosa Mitsuoki's Flowing Cherry and Autumn Maple with Poem Slips,” Beyond Golden Clouds, ed. Katz, Janice. 48–57. Chicago, Illinois: The Art Institute of Chicago, 2009.
- Phillips, Quitman Eugene (2000). "Documenting Practices". The Practices of Painting in Japan, 1475-1500. pp. 13–24. doi:10.1515/9781503617773-006. ISBN 978-1-5036-1777-3. S2CID 246248320.
- Phillips, Quitman. "Circumstances of Painting". The Practices of Painting in Japan, 1475-1500. Stanford, California: Stanford University Press, 2000. 25–37.
- Phillips, Quitman Eugene (2000). "Basic Operations and Agency". The Practices of Painting in Japan, 1475-1500. pp. 62–92. doi:10.1515/9781503617773-008. ISBN 978-1-5036-1777-3. S2CID 246265535.
- Stern, Harold. "Edo and Modern Periods." Birds, Beasts, Blossoms, and Bugs: The Nature of Japan. New York, New York: Harry N. Abrams, Inc., Publishing. 30, 65–67.
- Cunningham, Michael R. (1984). "Byōbu: The Art of the Japanese Screen". The Bulletin of the Cleveland Museum of Art. 71 (7): 223–232. JSTOR 25159871.
- Rosenfield, John M. (1993). "Japanese Studio Practice: The Tosa Family and the Imperial Painting Office in the Seventeenth Century". Studies in the History of Art. 38: 78–102. JSTOR 42620404.
- 守屋,正彦. すぐわかる日本の絵画. 東京: 東京美術, 2002. ISBN 4-8087-0716-0
- 吉田,友之. 桑実寺縁起. "続日本絵巻大成13 桑実寺縁起・道成寺縁起". Ed.小松茂美. 東京: 中央公論社, 1982. 122–132.
- 宮島, 新一. 日本の美術247 土佐光信と土佐派の系譜, 至文堂. 1986.
- 千野, 香織. 南北朝・室町時代の絵巻物 東京, ブリュッケ, 星雲社, 2010. 170–177. ISBN 9784434145834
