= Xia Chang =

Chinese painter and government official

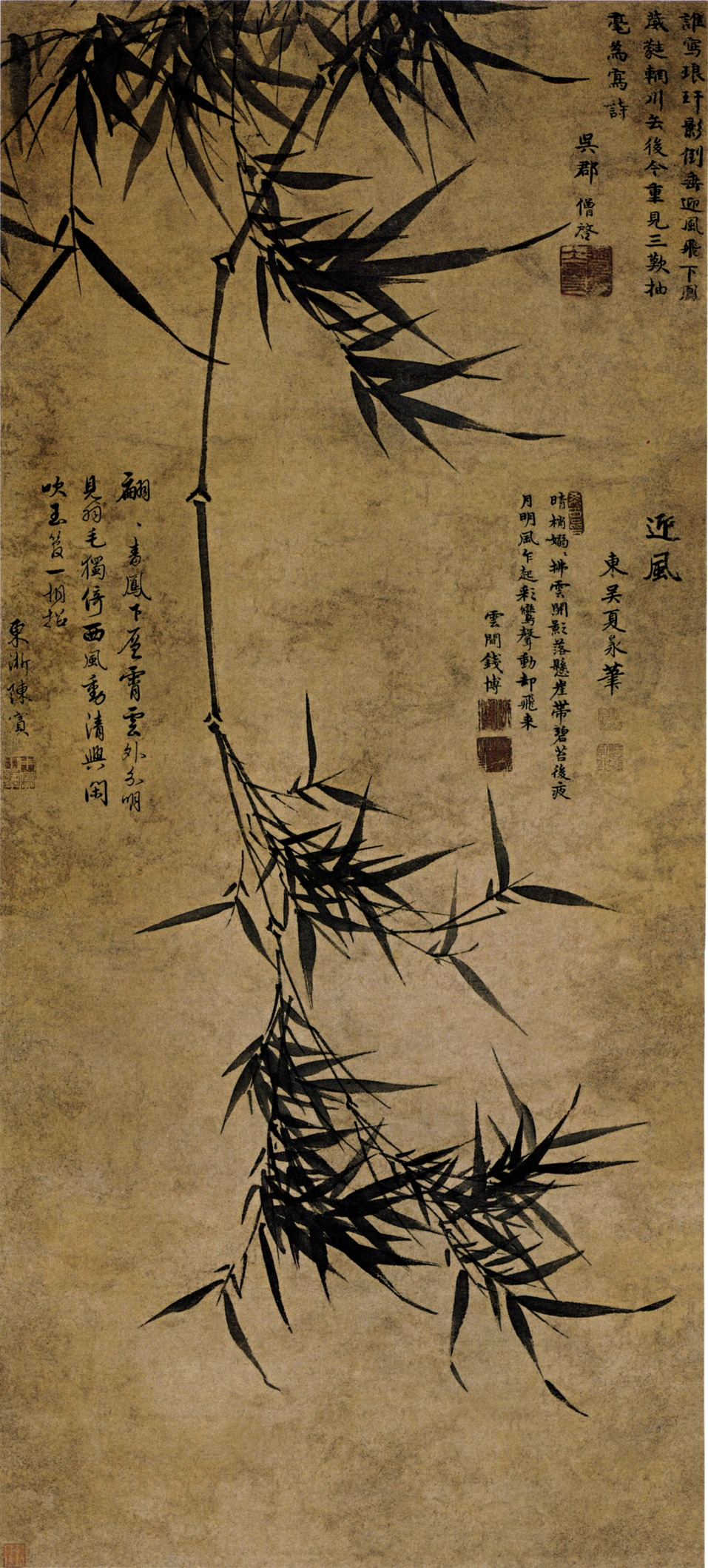
Xia Chang, Bamboo in Wind, Palace Museum, Beijing

Xia Chang (Chinese: 夏昶; pinyin: Xià Chàng; Wade–Giles: Hsia Ch'ang; 1388–1470) originally named Zhu Chang, was a Ming dynasty Chinese painter and government official.

Xia specialized in ink bamboo painting, following the style of Wang Fu. His courtesy name was 'Zhongzhao' (仲昭) and his art names were 'Yufeng' (玉峰) and 'Zizai jushi' (自在居士).

== Life ==
Xia Chang was born Zhu Chang in September 1388 in Kunshan. He passed the Imperial examinations in 1415, and entered the Hanlin academy. The Yongle Emperor ordered him to write inscriptions for new buildings in Beijing. In 1422 Xia Chang was transferred to a position in Beijing, which had recently replaced Nanjing as imperial capital. He became a secretary of the Bureau of Evaluations in the Ministry of Personnel. In 1448, he became a prefect in Jiangxi province. He was recalled to Beijing and appointed vice minister of the Court of Imperial Sacrifices. He retired in 1457, and died in 1470.
