= Iwasa Matabei =

Japanese artist

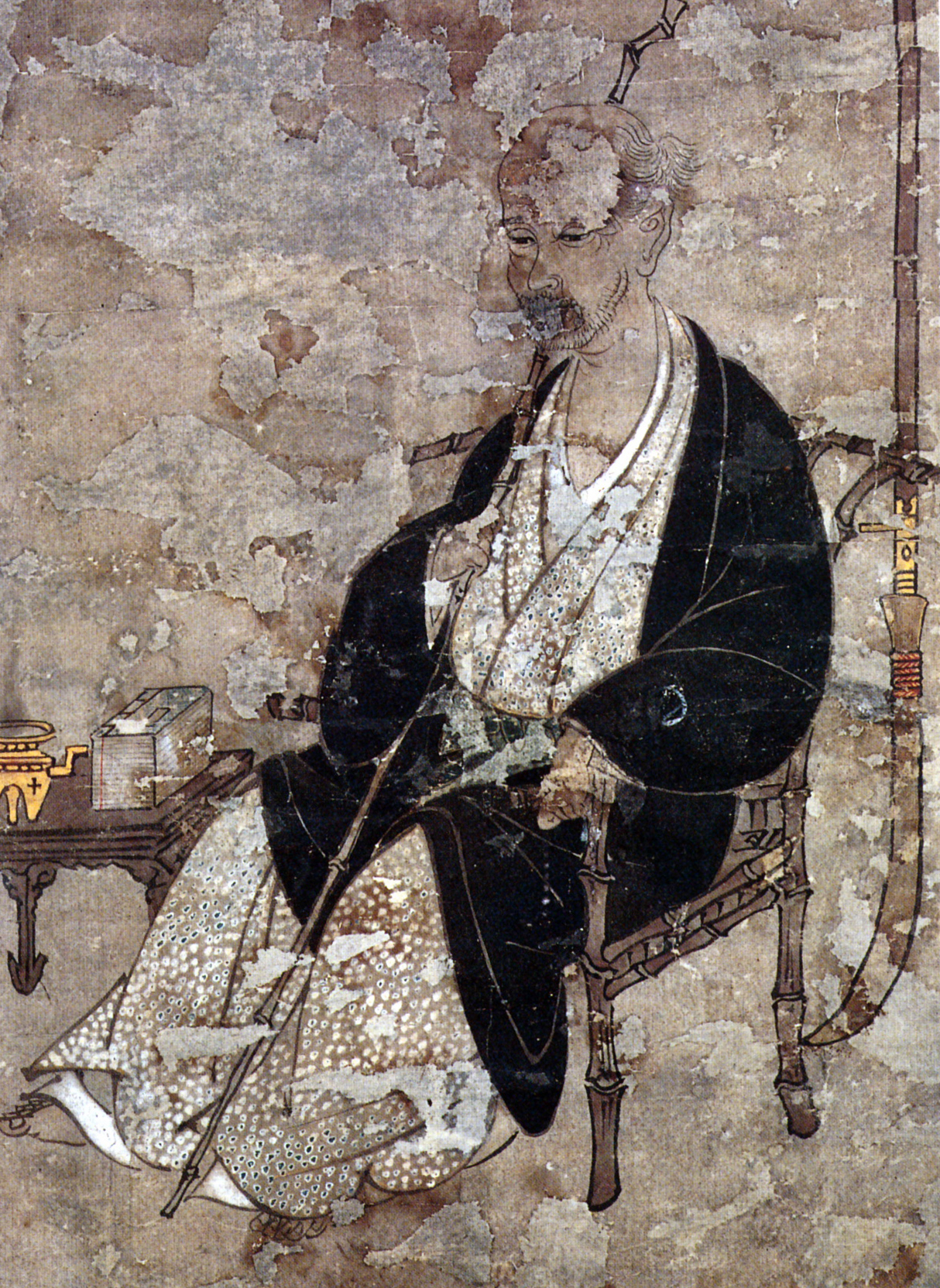
Self-portrait, unusually early for Japanese art, said to have been painted as he was dying in 1650. Important Cultural Property.

Iwasa Matabei (岩佐 又兵衛); original name Araki Katsumochi 1578 – July 20, 1650) was a Japanese artist of the early Tokugawa period, who specialized in genre scenes of historical events and illustrations of classical Japanese and Chinese literature, as well as portraits. He was the son of Araki Murashige, a prominent daimyō of the Sengoku period who had been made to commit suicide, leaving Matabei to be raised with his mother's family name, Iwasa.

Matabei's work was noted for its distinctive figures, with large heads and delicately drawn features, and he was effective both in colour and monochrome ink-wash painting, using an individual brush technique combining Tosa and Kanō elements. Although trained by Kanō Naizen of the Kanō school, he was more influenced by the traditions of the Tosa school, and signed a late series of portraits of the Thirty-six Poetry Immortals (1640) commissioned by the shōgun Tokugawa Iemitsu for a temple as "the artist Matabei of the later current from Tosa Mitsunobu".

Matabei's oeuvre remains shrouded in a degree of mystery, as he was active in a period before the full development of print engraving, and few works can be attributed to him with absolute certainty; most of the surviving paintings depict female beauties with elongated faces and plump cheeks. The works of Matabei have an affinity with the early paintings of ukiyo-e, but there is a disagreement among scholars as to whether they are ukiyo-e themselves or not. In Japan, it is common to regard Matabei as the originator of ukiyo-e. On the other hand, there is a theory that Matabei is not the source of ukiyo-e, but rather an independent painter of the Tosa school, because his patrons were from high social classes. According to this theory, he is misunderstood as the source of ukiyo-e only because he is confused with the ukiyo-e painter of the same name (Ōtsu no Matabei) who appears in Chikamatsu's plays.

His son Katsushige (d. 1673) was also a painter, known for dancing figures in a style like that of his father. The late Meiji-period ukiyo-e artist Kobayashi Kiyochika, despite the clear influence of Western art techniques on his own work, described himself as working in the style of Matabei and Hishikawa Moronobu.

== Notable works ==
The only work by Iwasa Matabei that has been designated a National Treasure is Rakuchu Rakugai Zu Byōbu (Funaki Version) (洛中洛外図屏風 (舟木本)), which is held by the Tokyo National Museum. The term Rakuchu Rakugai Zu (洛中洛外図) refers to byōbu (folding screens) depicting the scenery and customs of the urban and suburban areas of Kyoto. Numerous works were created from the Sengoku period to the Edo period, and only two works by Iwasa Matabei and Kanō Eitoku have been designated as National Treasures. Matabei's work depicts the Kyoto landscape around 1615 and is known as the "Funaki version" because it was owned by the Funaki family. It shows the Nijō Castle of the Tokugawa clan on the left and the Hōkō-ji Great Buddha Hall, symbolizing the Toyotomi clan, on the right.

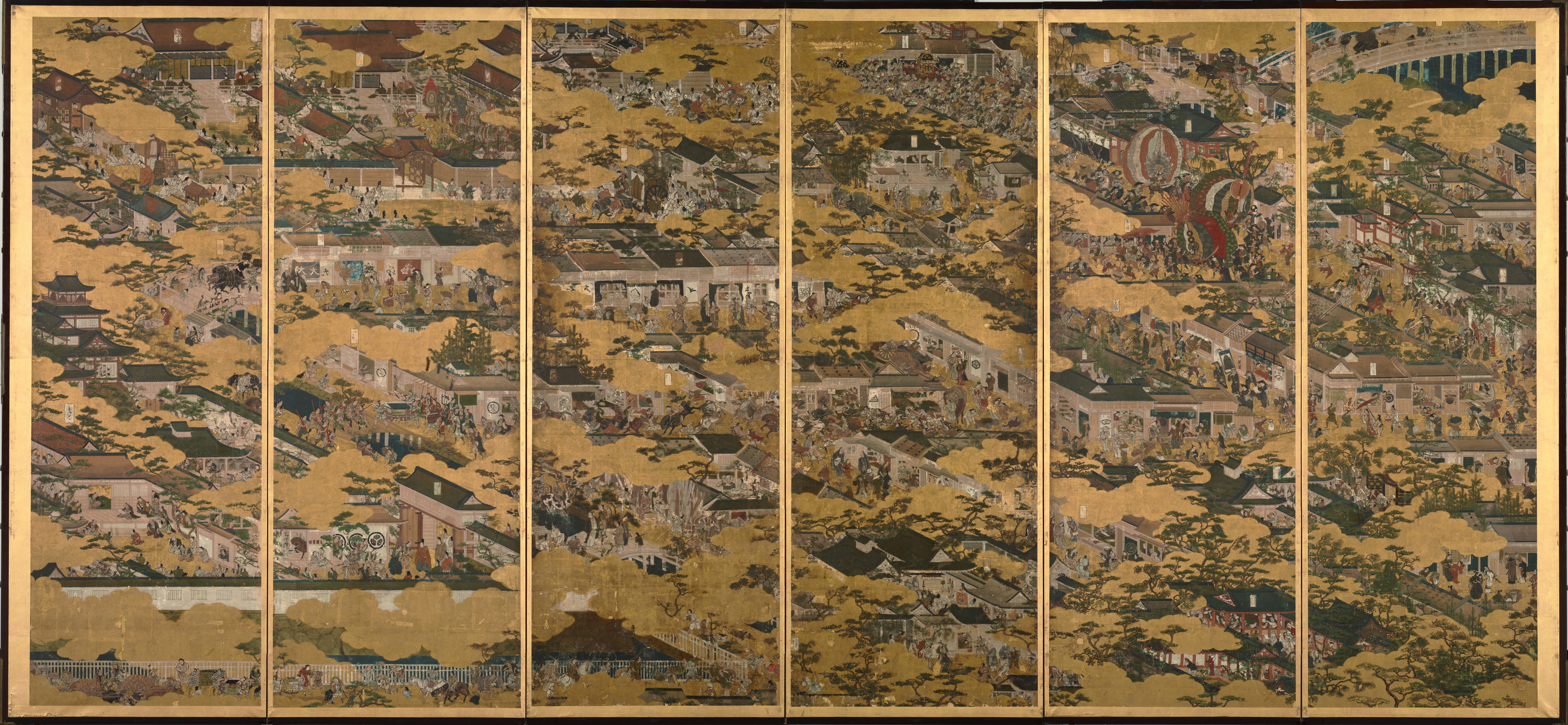
Left panel of the Rakuchu Rakugai Zu Byōbu (Funaki Version). National Treasure.

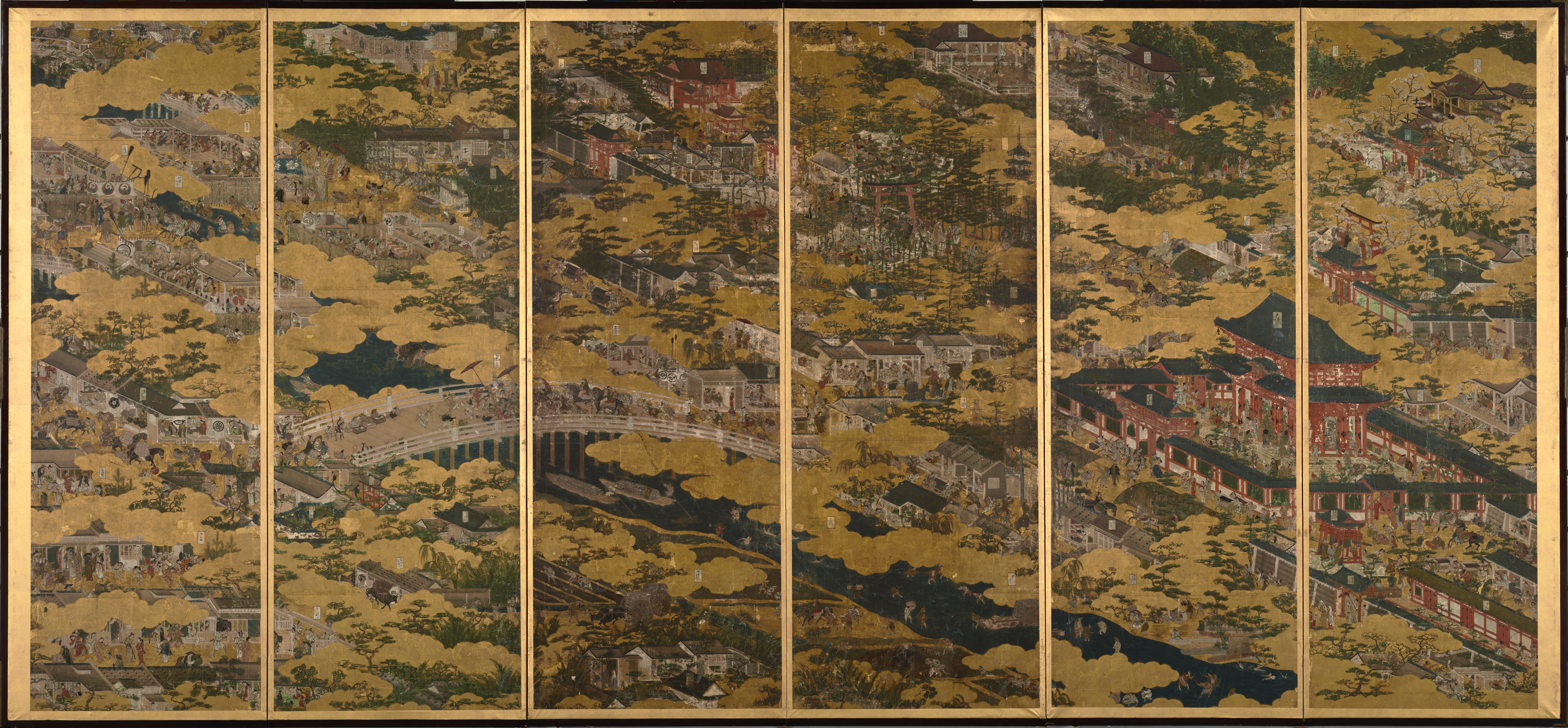
Right panel of the Rakuchu Rakugai Zu Byōbu (Funaki Version). National Treasure.

Hōkoku Sairei Zu Byōbu (豊国祭礼図屏風) is a work depicting the festival held at Toyokuni Shrine in 1604 to commemorate the seventh anniversary of Toyotomi Hideyoshi's death. It has been designated as an Important Cultural Property and is housed in the Tokugawa Art Museum. Although the preparations for this festival were carried out under the direction of Tokugawa Ieyasu, the missionary Jean Crasset analyzes that Ieyasu's intention was to adopt Hideyoshi's achievements as his own. On the left side of the artwork, there is a scene of people in the city dancing enthusiastically in extravagant costumes against the backdrop of the Hōkō-ji Great Buddha Hall. On the right, there is a scene depicting the dedication of the traditional dances noh and dengaku at the Toyokuni Shrine.

Matabei established a workshop and painted magnificent and long emakimono (picture scroll) based on the text of jōruri (traditional Japanese narrative music). The MOA Museum of Art houses three masterpieces: Yamanaka Tokiwa Monogatari Emaki (山中常盤物語絵巻), Jōruri Monogatari Emaki (浄瑠璃物語絵巻), and Horie Monogatari Emaki (堀江物語絵巻). These three works are considered masterpieces, with the first two being designated as Important Cultural Properties. Yamanaka Tokiwa Monogatari tells the story of Ushiwaka's revenge for the murder of his mother, Tokiwa Gozen. Jōruri Monogatari depicts a romantic story involving Ushiwaka. Horie Monogatari tells the story of Horie Saburo's child who seeks revenge for the death of his parents.

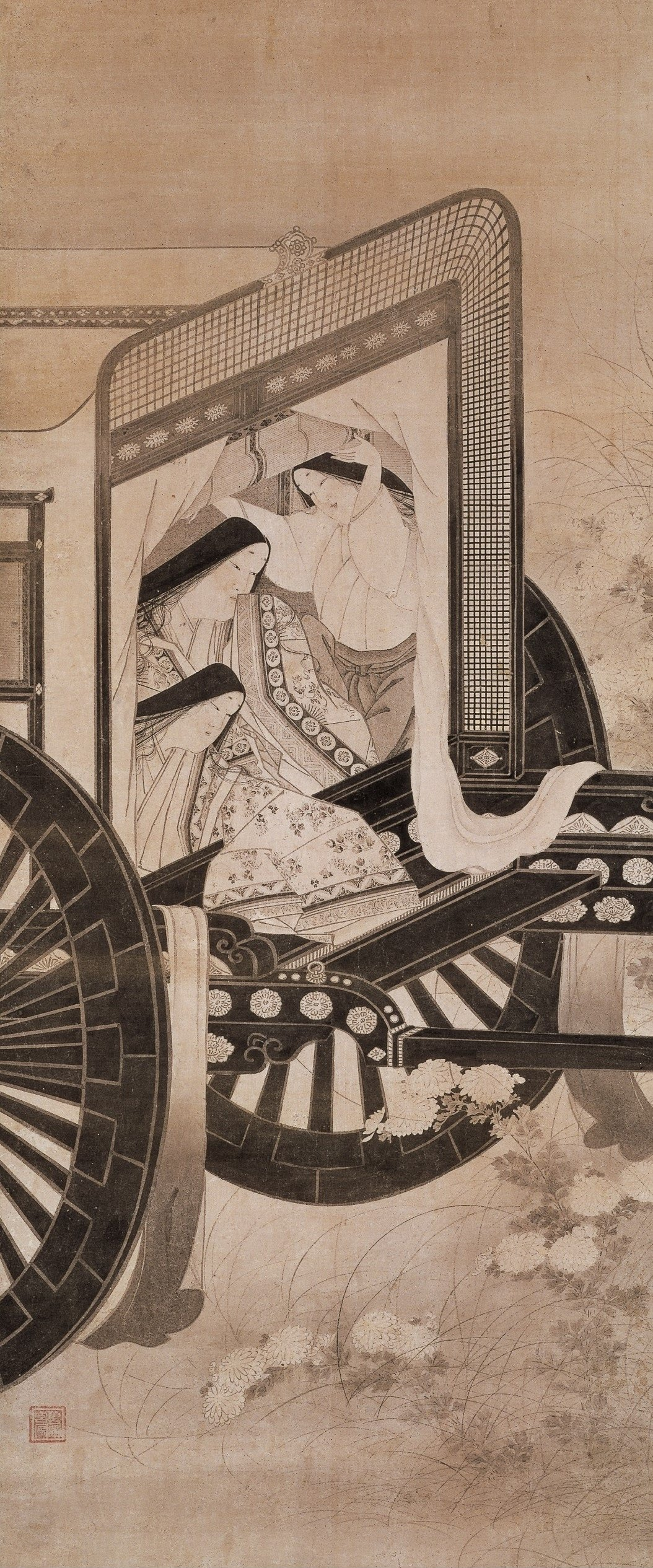
"Court Lady Enjoying Wayside Chrysanthemums" 17th century. Hanging scroll, ink and colour on paper. Important Cultural Property.

The work titled Kanjo Kangiku Zu (官女観菊図) in the Yamatane Museum is one of the works created by dividing a pair of folding screens, each with six panels that originally depicting twelve different subjects into twelve parts, each of which was transformed into an individual hanging scroll. This particular work of art has been designated as an Important Cultural Property.
