= Gu An =

Chinese painter

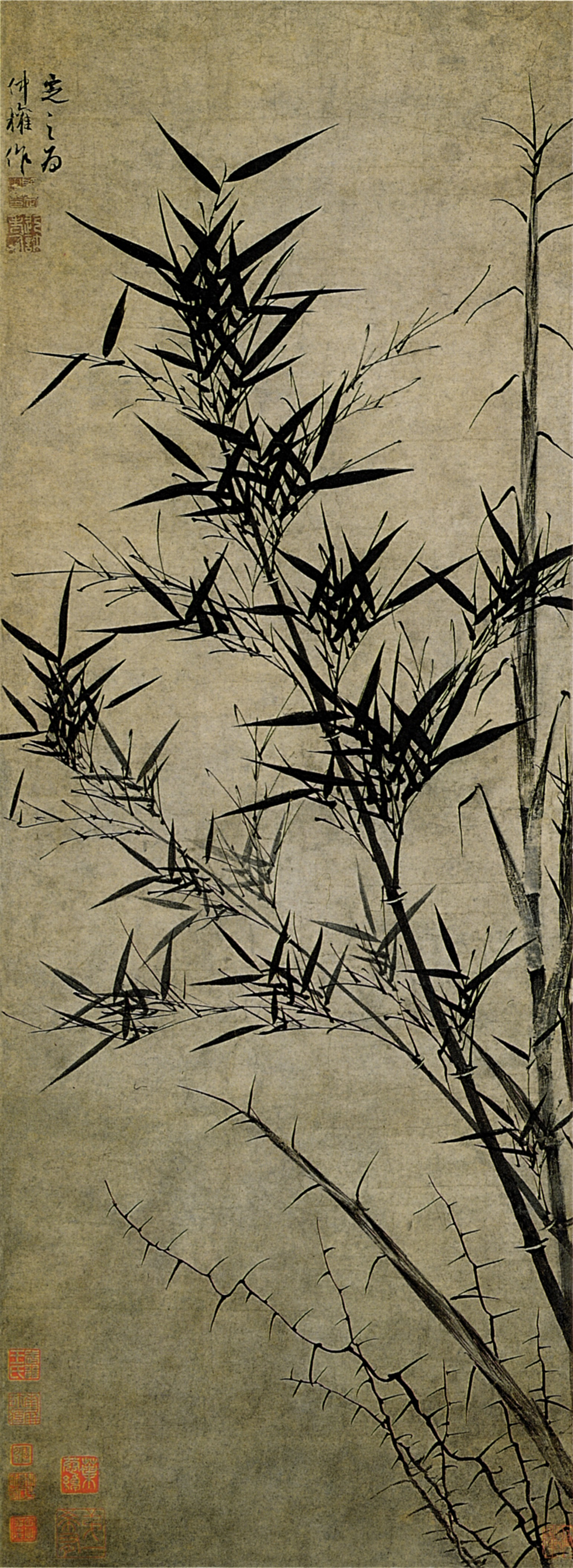
New Bamboo by Gu An, 14th century, Palace Museum

Gu An (simplified Chinese: 顾安; traditional Chinese: 顧安; pinyin: Gù Ān; Wade–Giles: Ku An; (ca. 1289–after 1365), style name as Dingzhi (定之), pseudonym as Yuna Jushi (迂那居士), was a famed Chinese painter in the Yuan Dynasty.

Gu An as born in Huaidong (淮東 - present day Kunshan in Jiangsu Province). He excelled in bamboo painting, particularly bamboo waving in the breeze.
