= Tosa school =

Japanese art movement

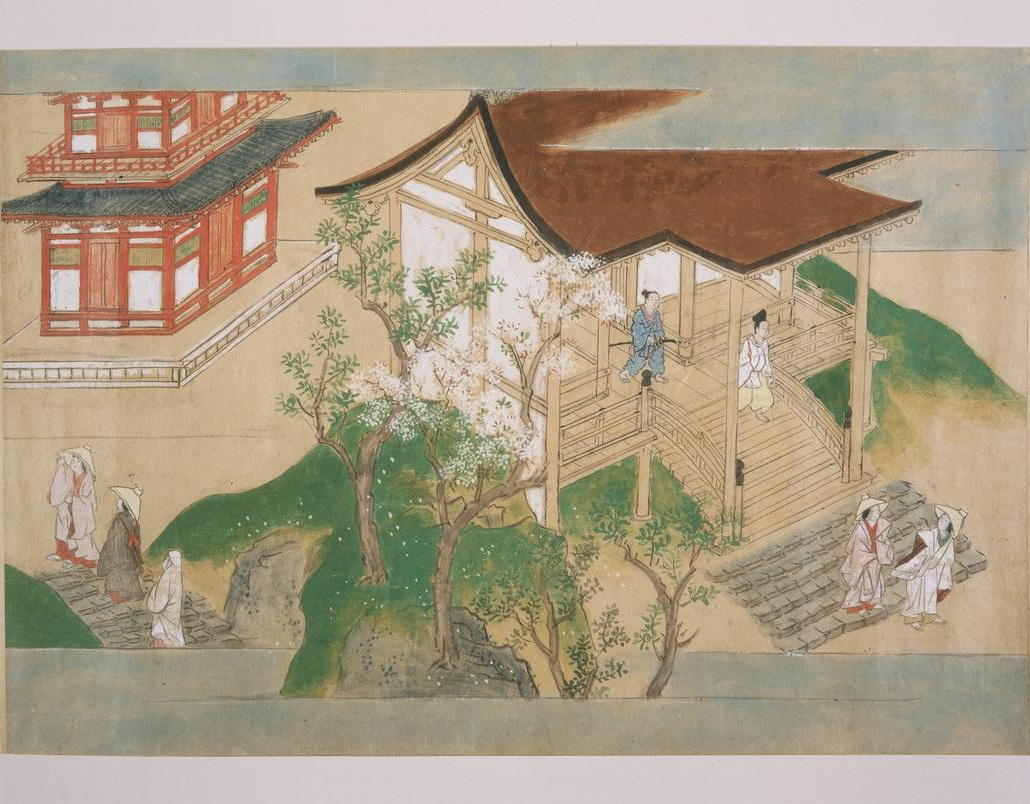
Scene from a long narrative scroll retelling the history of a Buddhist monastery, by Tosa Mitsunobu (1434–1535)

The Tosa school (土佐派, Tosa-ha) of Japanese painting was founded in the early Muromachi period (14th–15th centuries), and was devoted to yamato-e, paintings specializing in subject matter and techniques derived from ancient Japanese art, as opposed to schools influenced by Chinese art, notably the Kanō school (狩野派). Tosa school paintings are characterised by "areas of flat opaque colour enclosed by simple outlines, where drawing is precise and conventional", with many narrative subjects from Japanese literature and history. However, by the 17th century both Tosa and Kanō artists broadened their range, and the distinction between these and other schools became less clear.

The origins of this school of painting can be traced to Tosa Yukihiro (土佐行広) (fl. first half 15th century), who first used the professional name of Tosa, though unverified claims to earlier origins were made later by Mitsunobu (1434?–?1525) who formally founded the school. Mitsunobu served as the official painter (edokoro-azukari) at the imperial court, specializing in courtly subjects painted in the yamato-e (やまと絵) style.

The Tosa school under Mitsunobu retained the position of (edokoro azukari (絵所領, "head of the Imperial painting bureau")) for three generations, until 1569, and regained the post 1634 under Mitsunori (See #History below). Until the 17th century, the Tosa school painted for the court and aristocratic patrons, which favored such painting subjects as scenes from the classic Tale of Genji (源氏絵), but in later years, the school's range expanded to include bird-and-flower painting and other Chinese-inspired themes and styles. In general, the Tosa style is characterized by rather flat, decorative compositions, fine linework, great attention to detail, and brilliant color.

== History ==
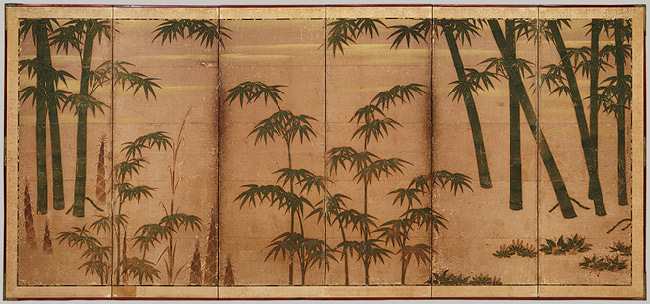
Bamboo in the Four Seasons, Muromachi period (1392–1573) Attributed to Tosa Mitsunobu (1434–1535). Pair of six-panel folding screens; color, ink, and gold on paper; 174.3 × 381.6 cm

It is starting with Tosa Mitsunobu that a definite art school (atelier, workshop) and family line can be established. But Mitsunobu purports that the origins of the school can be traced back further to Fujiwara Tsunetaka (Yukimitsu) (藤原行光) who held the post of edokoro azukari (絵所領) in 1355–1371.

The earliest documentary evidence for an artist using the name Tosa are two early 15th-century references to a man named Fujiwara Yukihiro (藤原 行広) (fl. 1406–1434) who was also known as Tosa Shōgen (土佐 将監), a title derived from his position as governor of Tosa Province. Yukihiro's activity as a painter is known primarily from an inscription on illustrated handscrolls of the Stories of the Origin of Yūzū Nembutsu (融通念仏縁起); 1414, Seiryōji (清涼寺), Kyoto.

A bloodline descent from Yukimitsu to Mitsunobu (father-son?) is speculated, but the family document Tosa Monjo (土佐文書)lacks records covering that period. Mitsunobu's daughter married Kanō Motonobu, head of the Kanō school, which increased the tendency of Kanō artists, already using two distinct styles, to work in a Tosa style when occasion demanded. The surviving paintings that can be attributed to Mitsunobu show less quality than his reputation in historical sources would suggest, but many fine works remain from Mitsunobu's hand. Although he painted both Buddhist paintings and portraits in addition to the standard repertoire of courtly themes, he is best known for his illustrated handscrolls, emaki (絵巻), such as The Legends of Kiyomizu-dera (清水寺縁起).

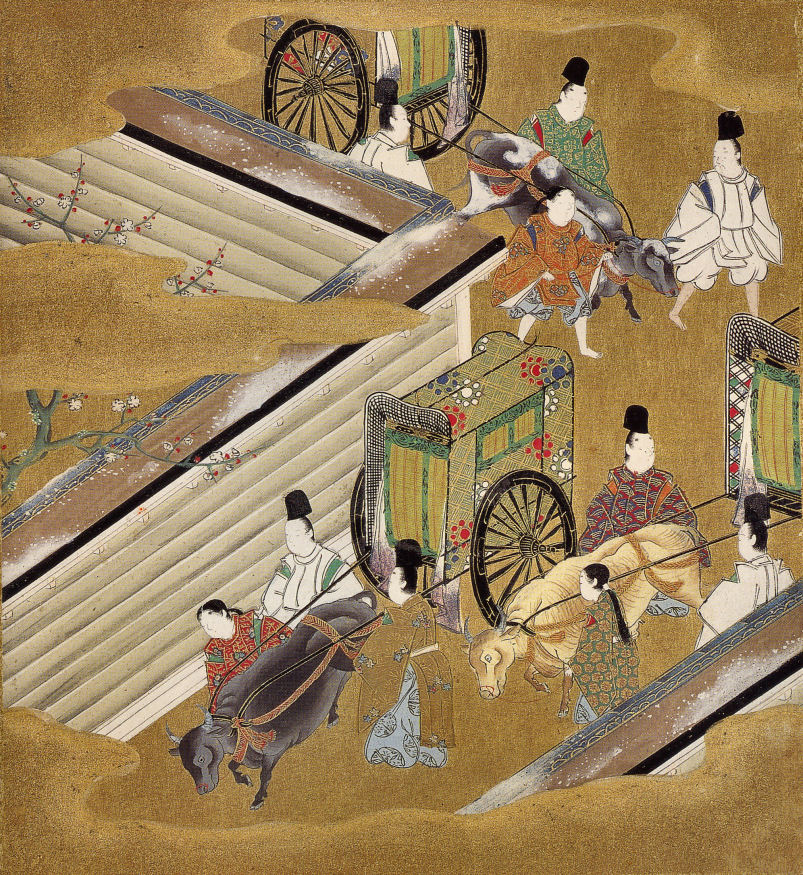
Illustration of the Genji Monogatari ch.42 – 匂宮 Niō no Miya ("The Perfumed Prince") Credited to Tosa Mitsuoki (1617–1691).

The Tosa school's art tradition was passed from Mitsunobu to Mitsumochi (土佐光茂) (1496 – c. 1559) under whom the fortunes of the school began to decline, then to Mitsumochi (土佐光元), but Mitsumochi perished in battle in 1569 causing the family to lose their position as head of the painting bureau (edokoro-azukari). The headship of the school passed to Tosa Mitsuyoshi (土佐光吉)(1539–1613), whose relationship with his predecessors is uncertain.

Mitsuyoshi eventually left the capital and his post and settled in the city of Sakai (堺), a port city near Osaka, where he sold paintings to the local townspeople. Mitsumochi also moved away from the traditional Tosa themes to specialize in bird-and-flower paintings. During this period, the stewardship of the imperial painting bureau passed from the Tosa school into the hands of Kanō school painters.

Mitsuyoshi's son, Mitsunori (光則) (1583–1638) continued to live and work in Sakai, painting for townsmen, until 1634 when he moved to the capital with his eldest son, Mitsuoki (光起) (1617–1691) at the invitation of Emperor Go-Mizunoo, where Mitsunori began painting ceremonial fans for the court. Twenty years later, in 1654, Mitsuoki won back the position of edokoro-azukari for the family, which enabled him to revive the school. Mitsuoki rejuvenated the traditional Tosa style by introducing elements from Chinese painting. He is particularly noted for his elegant paintings of quail, as for example, the Chrysanthemum and Quail screens which he painted with the help of his son Mitsunari (光成) (1646–1710).

Mitsuoki's successors headed the Imperial painting bureau until the end of the Edo period, but their reliance on imitating the style of Mitsuoki, rather than developing new techniques or themes, led to the production of works that were increasingly static and conventional. However, Mitsusada (1738–1806), a dedicated practitioner of the Tosa traditions, managed to effect a temporary Tosa revival.

Artists of the school but not the family were more significant, notably Sumiyoshi Jokei (1599–1670), a pupil of Mitsuyoshi, and his son Gukei Sumiyoshi (1631–1705), whose work revitalized the original tradition of small narrative scrolls with emphasis on details of everyday life. Reviving interest in Japanese history in the 18th and 19th centuries kept demand for Tosa style work alive, but the style of the school, with its thin line and reliance on detail was less suited to the larger hanging-scrolls that were now the format preferred by patrons. The interest in painting everyday life of the Tosa school was influential on the ukiyo-e school of paintings and prints, especially on the aristocratic painter Iwasa Matabei (1578–1650), who is regarded as one of the founders of ukiyo-e.

== Notable Tosa artists ==
- Tosa Yukihiro
- Tosa Mitsunobu
- Tosa Mitsuoki
- Tosa Mitsumochi (1496 – c.1559)
- Tosa Mitsumoto (fl. 1530–1569)
- Tosa Mitsuyoshi (1539–1613)
- Tosa Mitsunori (1583–1638)
- Tosa Mitsunari (1646-1710)
- Tosa Mitsusada (1738–1806)
- Tosa Mitsuzane (1780–1852)
- Iwasa Matabei
- Awataguchi Takamitsu
