= Bamboo painting =

Genre of East Asian painting

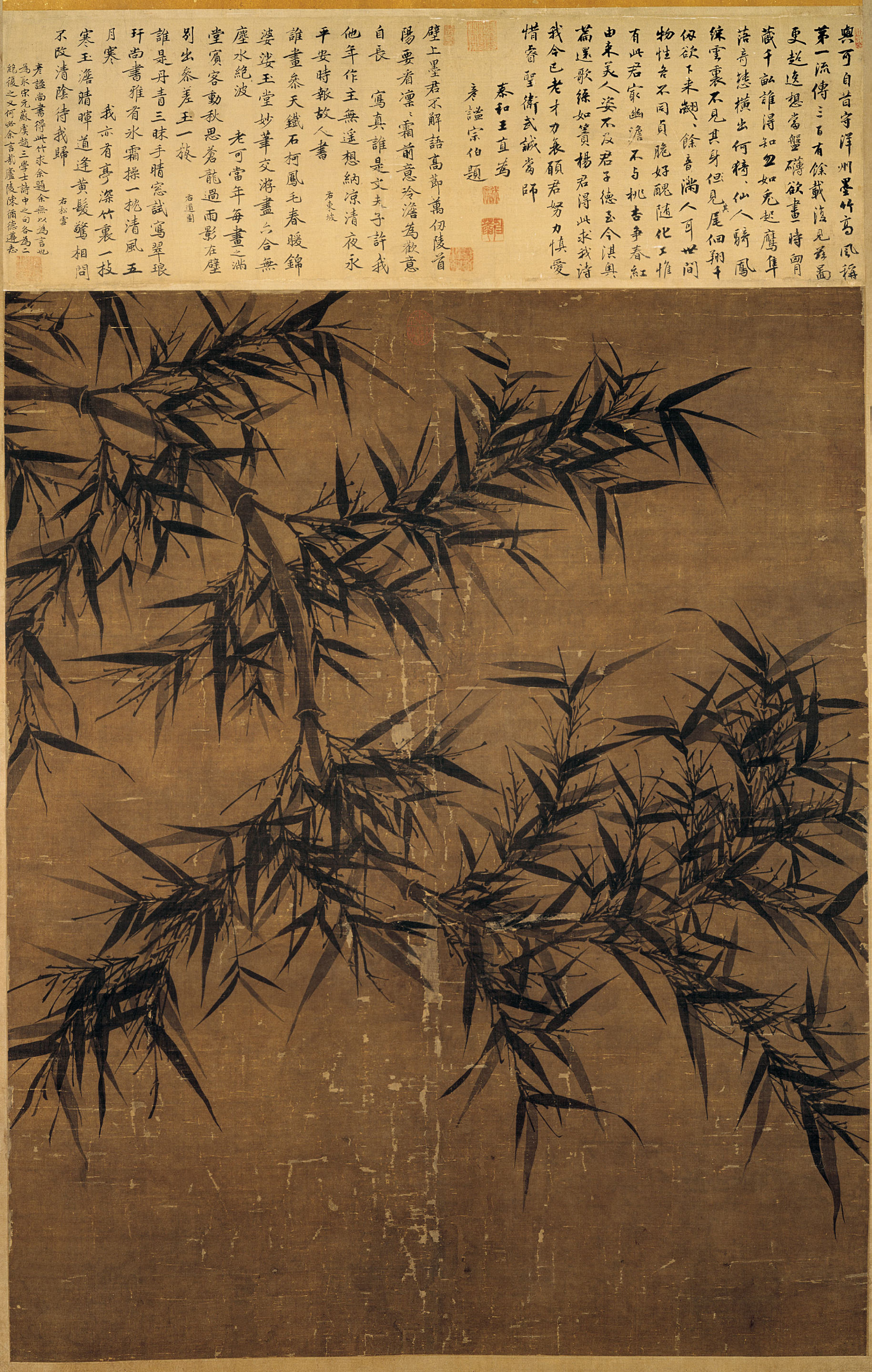
Example of ink bamboo painting by Wen Tong, c. 1060

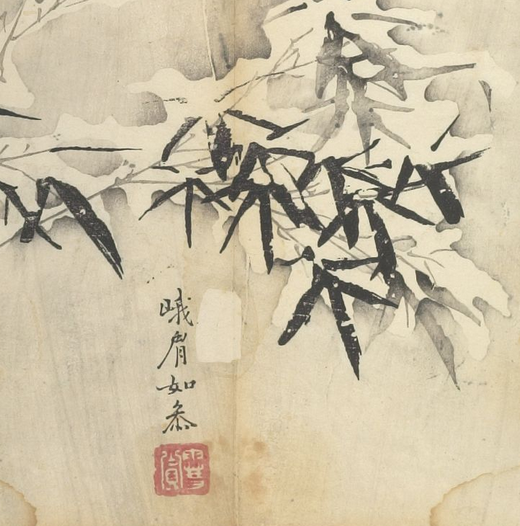
Bamboo in snow from the 'Ten Bamboo Studio Manual of Painting and Calligraphy', a woodblock print with additions by hand, 1633

Works of bamboo painting, usually in ink, are a recognized genre of East Asian painting. In a work of bamboo painting in ink, a skilled artist and calligrapher will paint a bamboo stalk or group of stalks with leaves. The contrast between the foreground and background, and between the varying textures represented by the stalks and the leaves, gave scope to the painter to demonstrate his or her mastery with an inkpot and a brush.

The bamboo painter often inscribes a poem that accompanies the painting and further elucidates the motif. The poem is often an integral part of the work as a whole. A viewer of the work can compare the calligraphy of the poem with the calligraphy of the painting, as both are typically inscribed with the same brush and reflect a similar mood and state of awareness.

A standard primer on classical East Asian bamboo painting is Hu Zhengyan's "Ten Bamboo Studio Manual of Painting and Calligraphy" (1633), with woodblock print illustrations. Because of the volume of bamboo works painted over time, the production of a work of ink bamboo became one of the standard subjects to which an East Asian student could be set in a competitive examination.

Like bamboo painting, bambooworking is found across East Asia as bamboo is regarded as culturally significant.

== Appreciation ==
From the days of their common origin, Chinese painting and Chinese writing have been allied arts. They use the same equipment and share aims, techniques, and standards. Ever since the beginning, bamboo has been written and also been painted in the same manner, in other words, a work depicting bamboo is both a painting and a piece of calligraphy. There are so-called “bamboo painters” who all their lives paint only bamboo. The bamboo is strong, upright, and dependable. He may bend with the wind, the storm and the rain, but he never breaks. He is a true gentleman of courage and endurance (Ju 1989).

The first principle of bamboo composition is, the four parts of the plant should be considered in the following order: stem, knot, branches and leaves. If the basic rule is not followed, time and effort will be wasted and the picture will never be completed.” This is the beginning of the early Book of Bamboo, a part of the Mustard Seed Garden manual of painting which was prepared and published by Chinese master in the year 1701 A.D. No bamboo painting is a photographic copy of some bamboo at some particular place, seen from a particular angle; instead it is a suggestion of the true essence of the bamboo, an expression of the qualities of a true Chinese gentleman, whom the bamboo symbolizes (Ju 1989).

The bamboo plant came under close observation by many East Asians because of its persistence and vegetative productivity. The plant was especially appreciated by men and women educated in the tradition of Confucius. It came to be seen as an exemplar of moral force, and appreciating the bamboo was seen as an act of self-cultivation. It was said of the ink bamboo painter Wen Tong that "there are whole bamboos in his heart" (胸有成竹).

Bamboo is not exclusive to the Four Noble Kind group. It also belongs to a distinct group where it openly fraternizes with pine trees and plum blossoms. Collectively, they are called the Three Friends of Winter because bamboo and pine do not wither on winter days and the plum blossoms starts blooming during the cold season.

Bamboo also exhibits a certain visual appeal on educated people because its silhouette cast by either the sun or moon on the paper windows of a Chinese house produced a poetic effect. Its straight stalk was the symbol of the sage, in that adversity could always bend it but it could never break it. The inner region of the bamboo stalk symbolizes the void that must be established in one's mind before thinking of useful ideas. To put it in simpler terms, one should always have clarity of mind when dealing with things to avoid chaos and to achieve desired results.

On the technical area, one needed to be an expert with the brush in order to execute perfectly cylindrical, smooth and hard internodes, and thin, translucid, nervous leaves placed in various perspectives. One should also have a keen talent in identifying where to place dark tones and light tones in the painting.

These characteristics are enough to validate that bamboo is a complete subject because it portrays lasting values one needed to get on with life and it commands a truly talented painter to create varying tones that never repeat.

== Bamboo Art ==
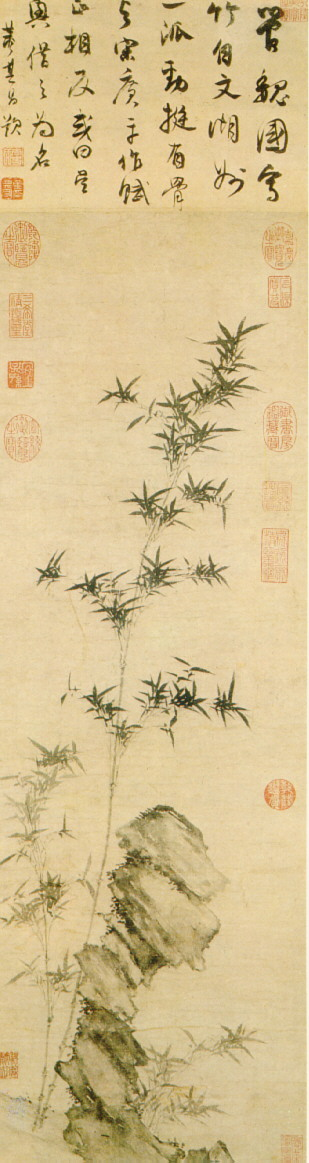
Bamboo and Stone (竹石圖) by Guan Daosheng

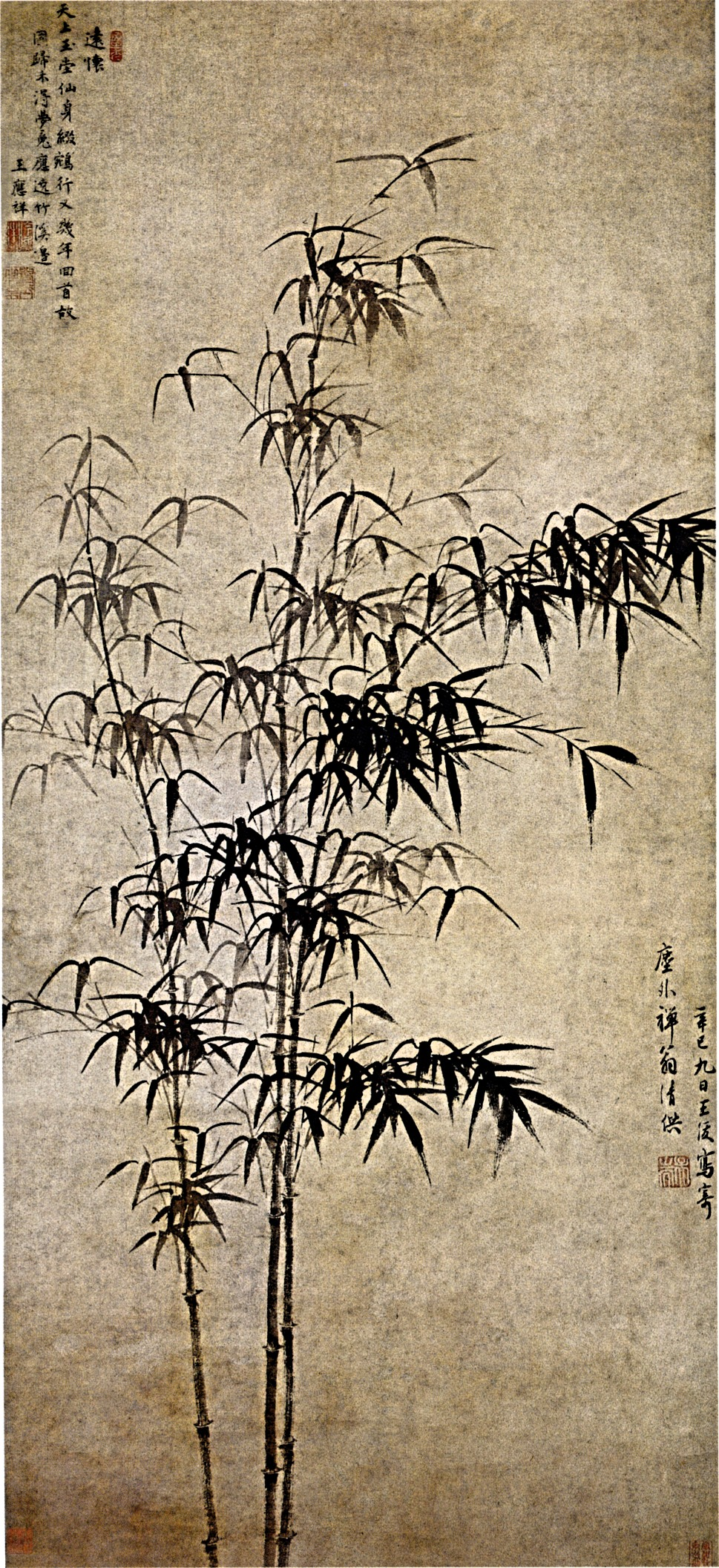
Ink Bamboo (墨竹圖) by Wang Fu

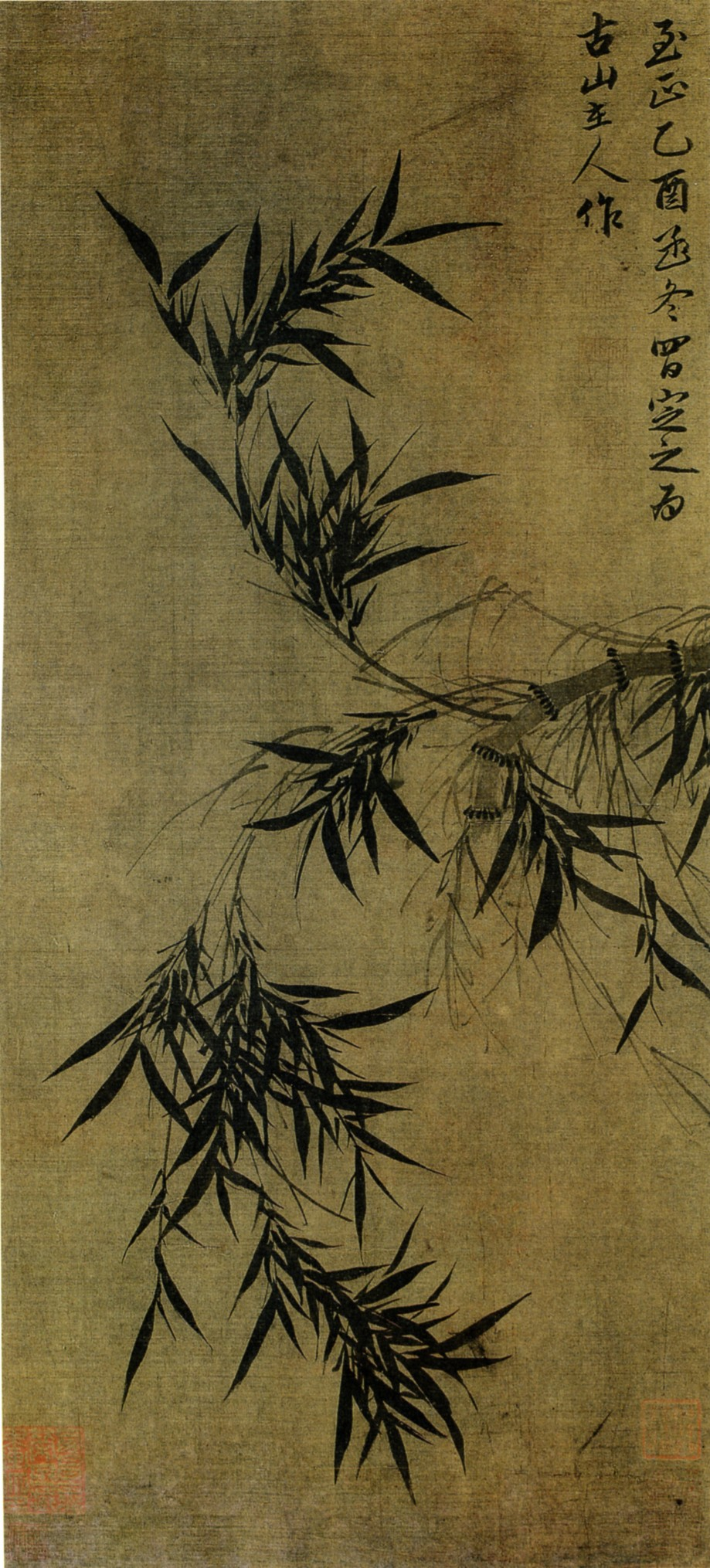
Ink Bamboo (墨竹圖) by Gu An

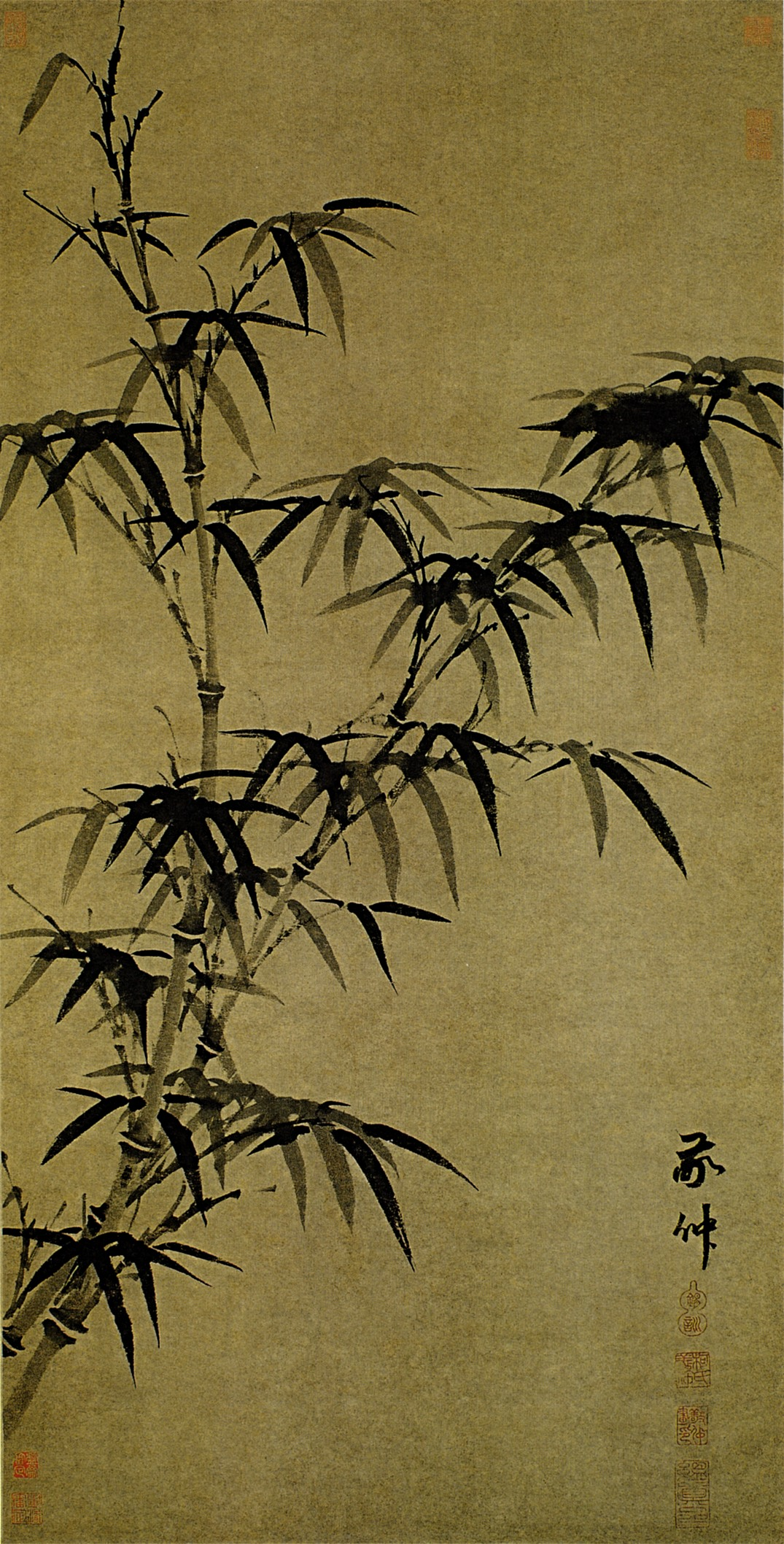
Twin Bamboo (雙竹圖) by Ke Jiusi

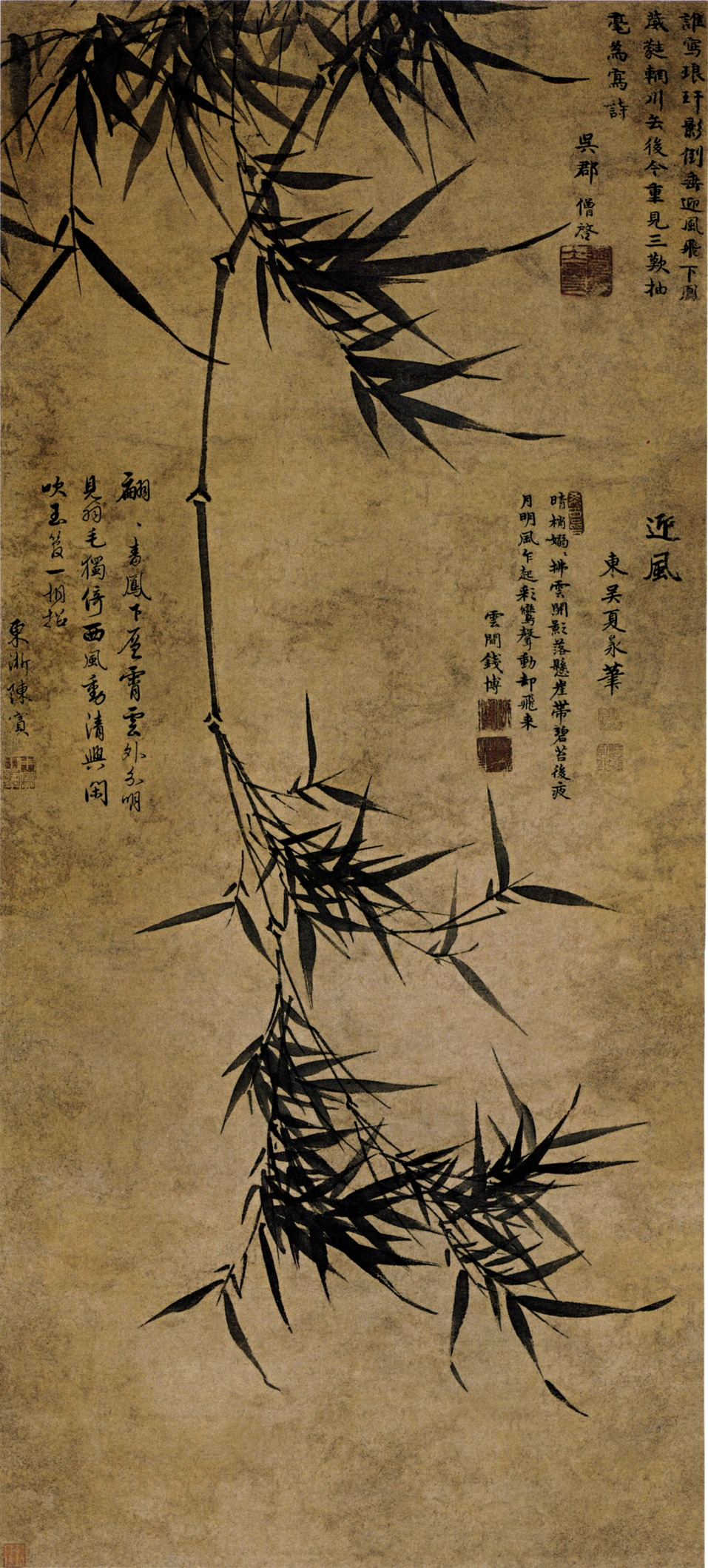
Bamboo in Wind (風竹圖) by Xia Chang
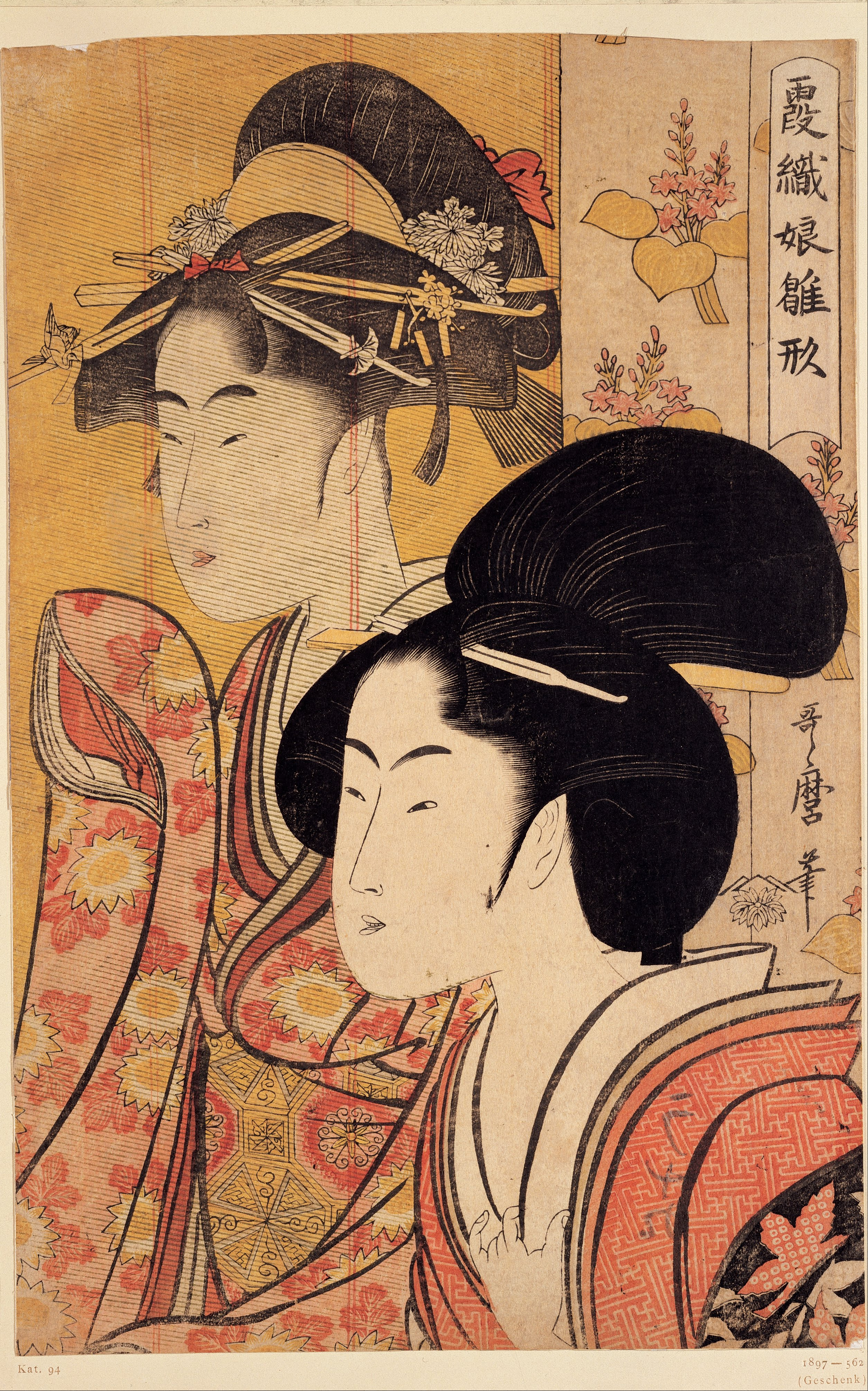
Kitagawa Utamaro - Two Beauties with Bamboo

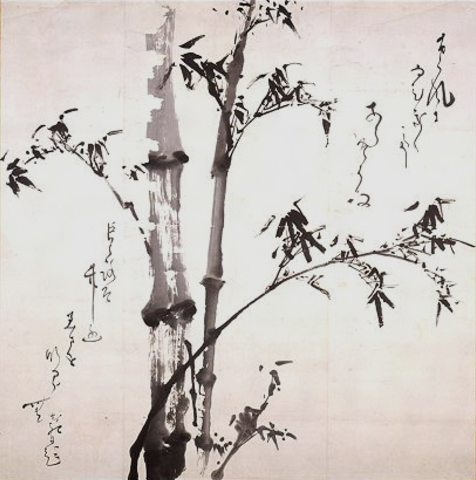
Bamboo by Hatta Tomonori

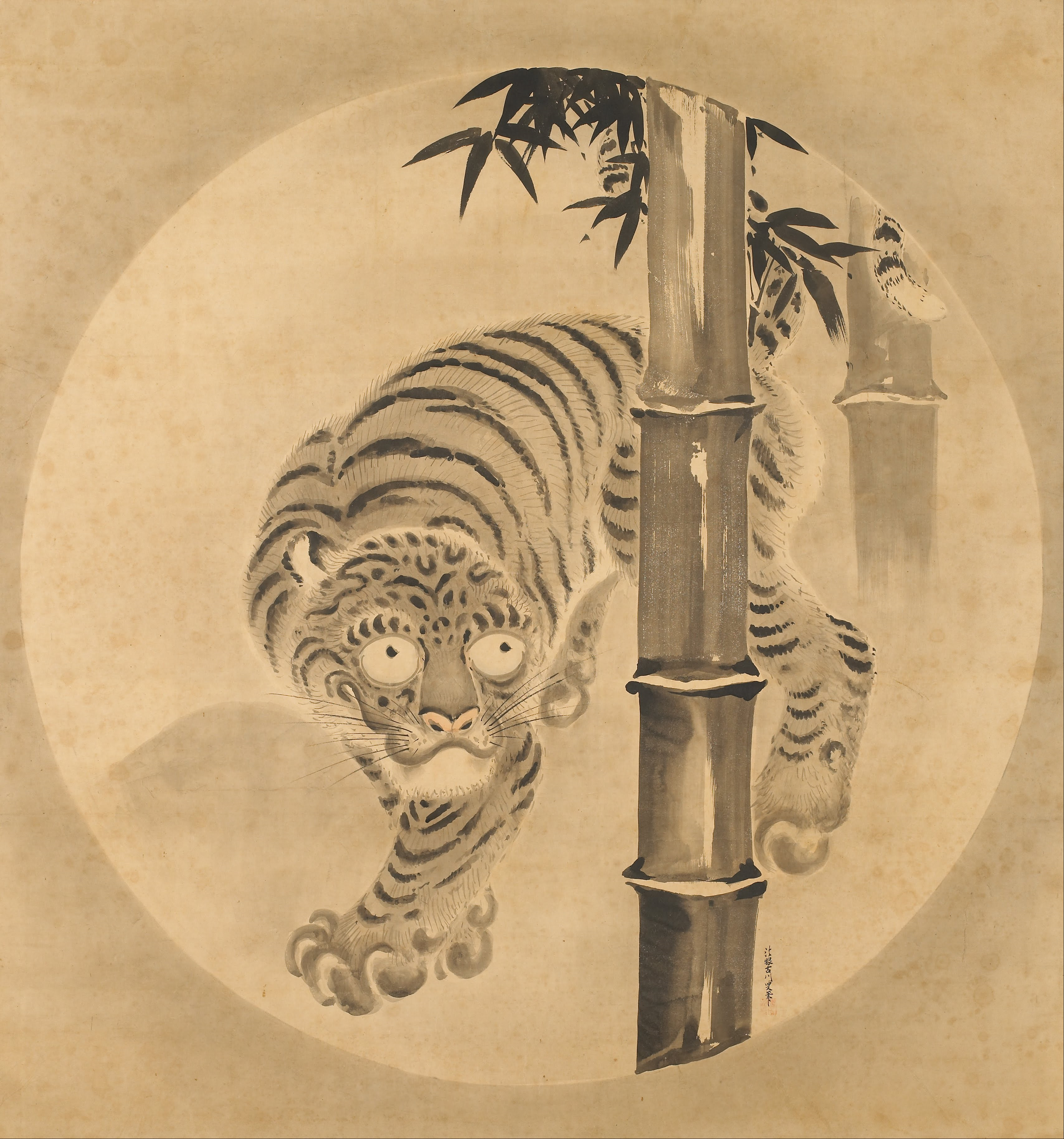
Kano Tsunenobu - Tiger Emerging from Bamboo

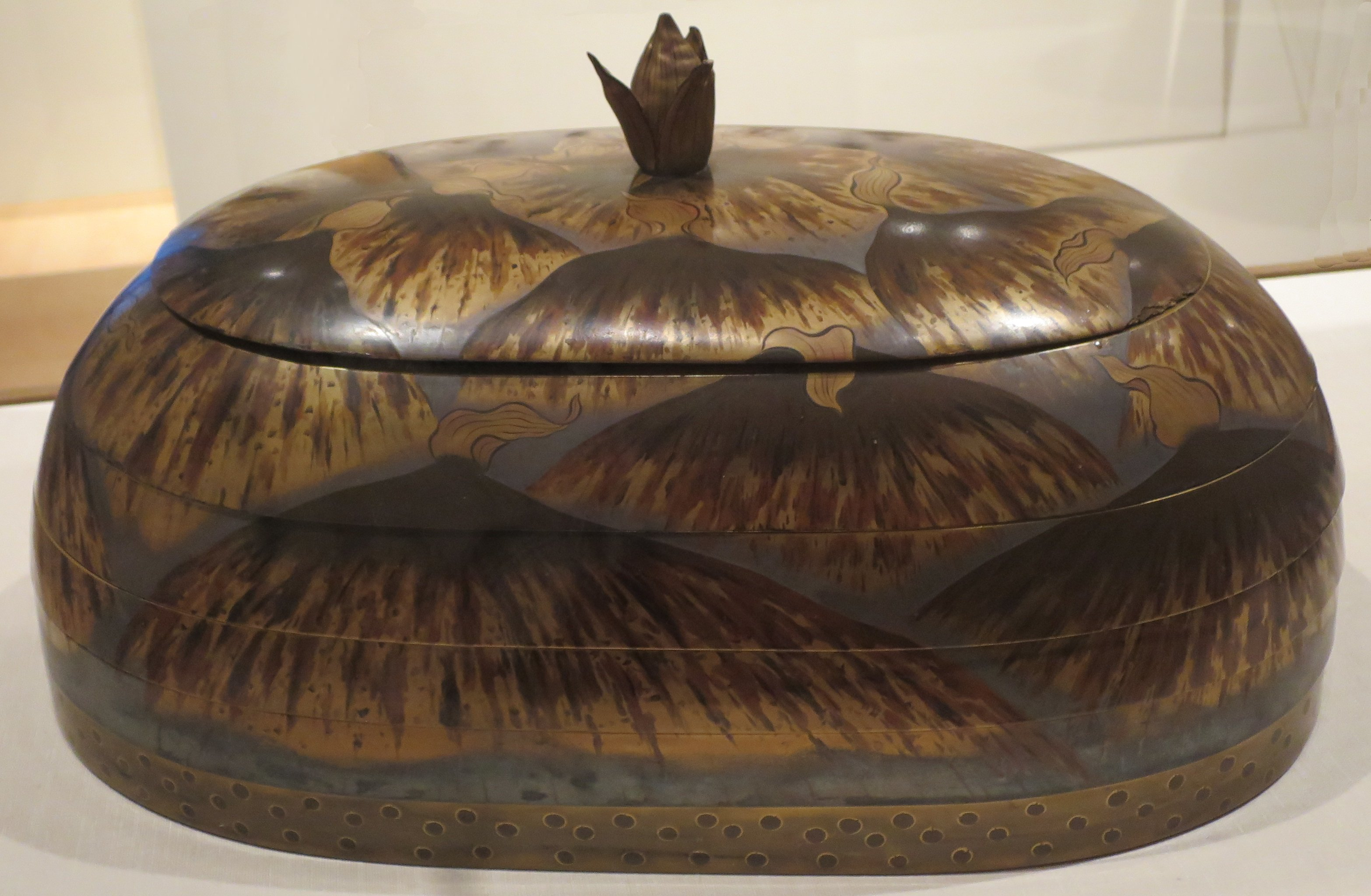
Jubako with design of bamboo shoots, Showa period

== See also ==
- Guan Daosheng
- Gu An
- Ke Jiusi
- Xia Chang
- Wang Fu
- Kitagawa Utamaro
