= Tosa Mitsunori =

Japanese illustrator

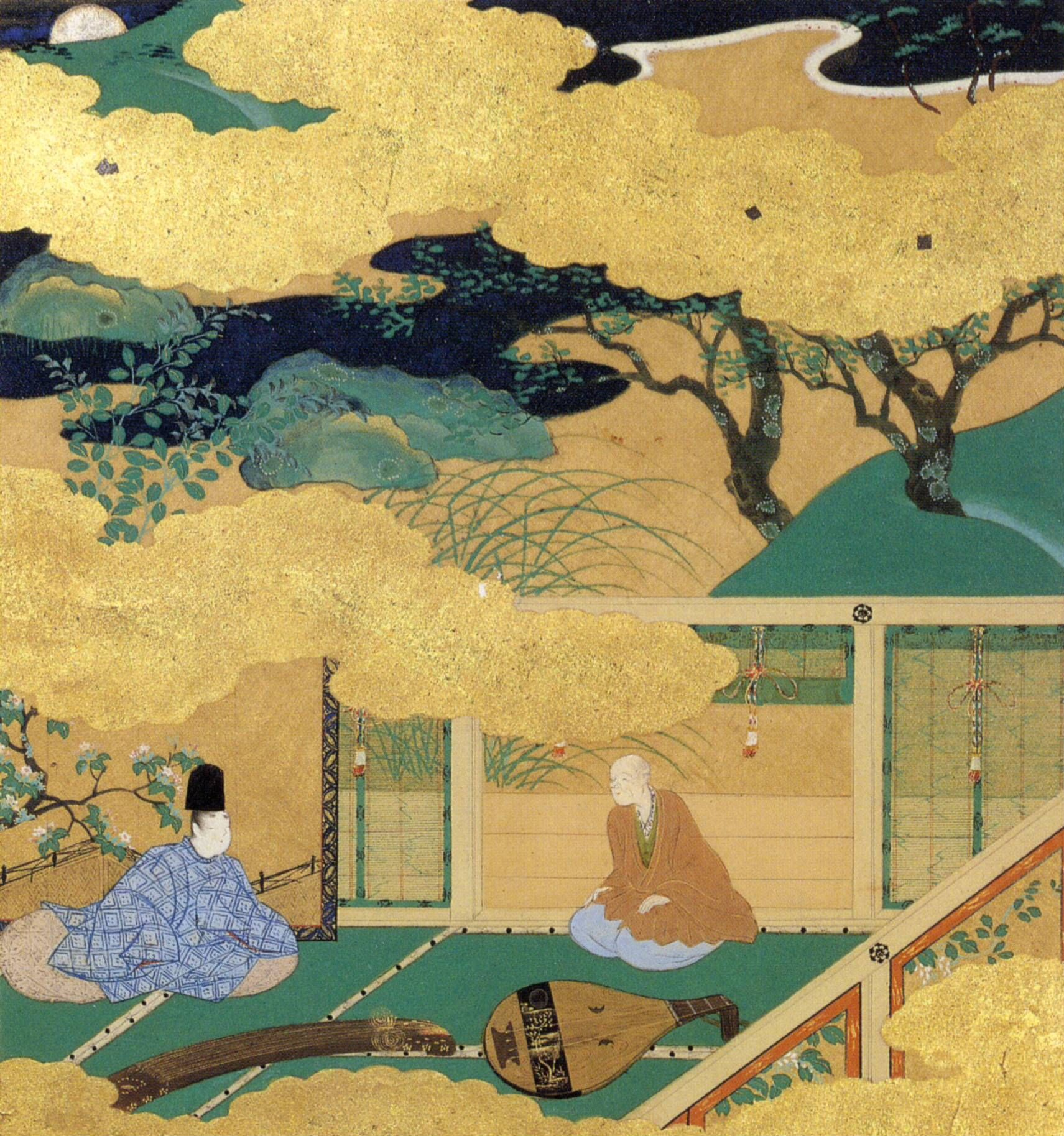
Illustration by Tosa Mitsunori from The Tale of Genji.

Tosa Mitsunori (土佐光則, January 16, 1583 to March 1, 1638) was an illustrator from the Tosa school of painting during the Azuchi–Momoyama period and the early Edo period.

== Life ==
He was a son of Tosa Mitsuyoshi and the father of Tosa Mitsuoki. Although having moved to Sakai in his youth, he sometimes presented painted fans to the Sentō Imperial Palace, but he did not receive a position at the court. About the age of 52, in his later years, he returned to Kyoto with his eldest son, Mitsuoki.

== Works ==
Many small works with gold backgrounds using variegated paints kept up the tradition of the Tosa school and showed much skill in their delicacy of depiction and the combinations of colours.

Among the few surviving works of Mitsunori is a scroll known as the “Legend of the Taima mandala” (当麻曼荼羅図, Taimamandarazu), executed in a quite conservative style.

== Literature ==
- Tazawa, Yutaka: “Tosa Mitsunori” in Biographical Dictionary of Japanese Art. Kodansha, 825 pages, 1982. ISBN 978-0-87011-488-5.
- Laurance P. Roberts: “Mitsunori” in A Dictionary of Japanese Artists: Painting, Sculpture, Ceramics, Prints, Lacquer. Tuttle, 312 pages, 1976. ISBN 978-0-8348-0113-4.
