= Ke Jiusi =

Chinese artist (c. 1290–1343)

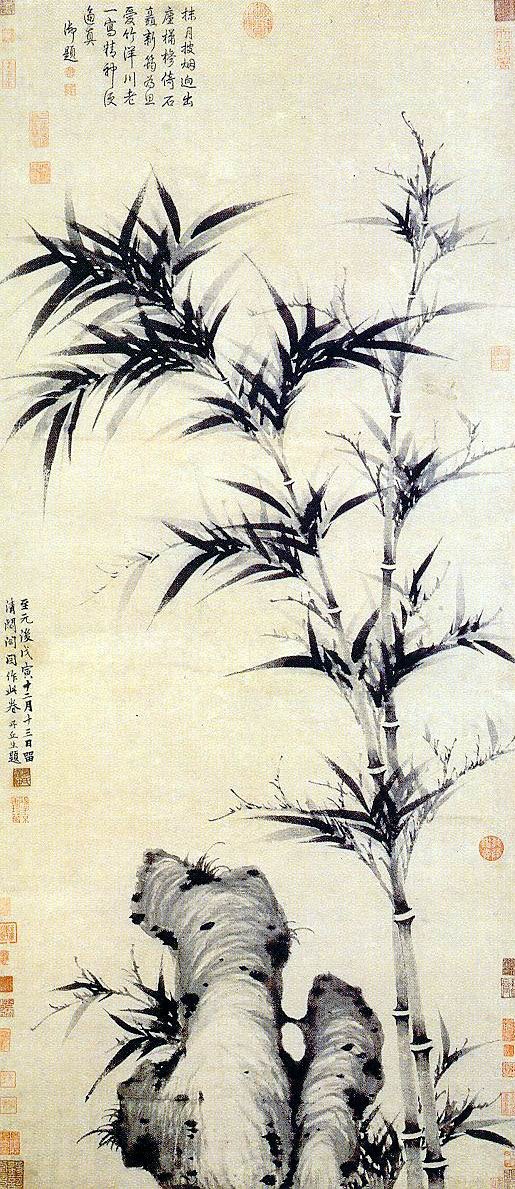
Ink Bamboo for the Qingbige

Ke Jiusi (Chinese: 柯九思; pinyin: Kē Jiǔsī; Wade–Giles: K'o Chiu-ssu; c. 1290 – 1343) was a Chinese landscape painter, calligrapher, and poet during the Yuan Dynasty (1271–1368).

Ke was born in the Zhejiang province. His style name was 'Jingzhong' (敬仲) and his pseudonyms were 'Dan qiusheng' (丹丘生) and 'Wuyun geli' (五云阁吏). Ke's painting followed the style of Wen Tong, utilizing bold and delicate brush strokes in a composed atmosphere. Ke's poetry included The Collection of Dan Qiushen (丹丘生集).
