= Li Kan (painter) =

Chinese painter

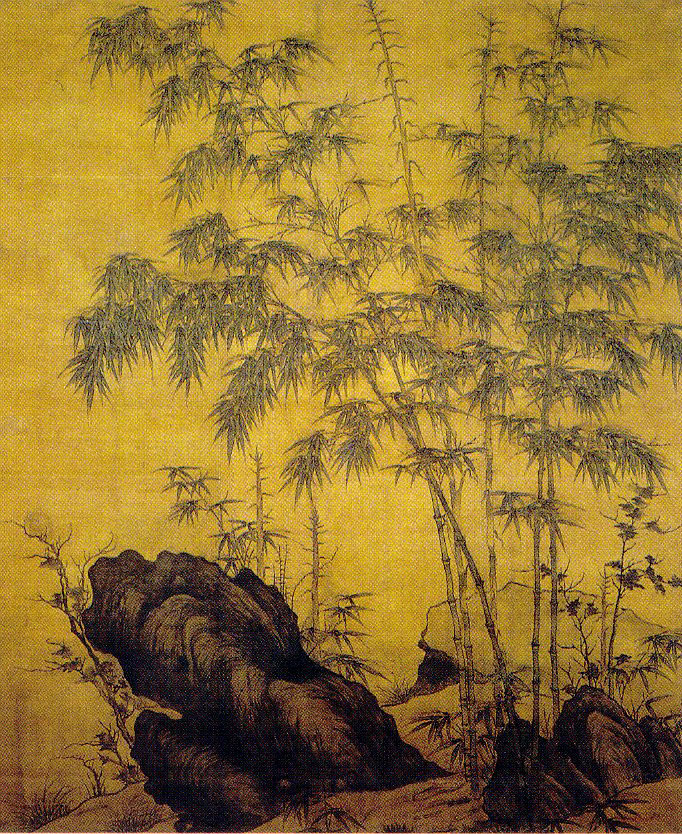
Li Kan, Bamboos and Rock

Lǐ Kàn (Li K'an, traditional: 李衎, simplified: 李衎; c. 1245 – 1320) was a Chinese painter during the Yuan Dynasty (1271–1368).

Li was born in Jiqiu county (present-day Beijing). His style name was 'Zhong Bin' and his sobriquet was 'Xi Zhai'. Li lived for some time in a bamboo valley, which inspired many of his works. His ink bamboo executed refined strokes which were commented on their realism, followed the style of Wen Tong.
