= Wang Fu (painter) =

Chinese landscape painter, calligrapher and poet

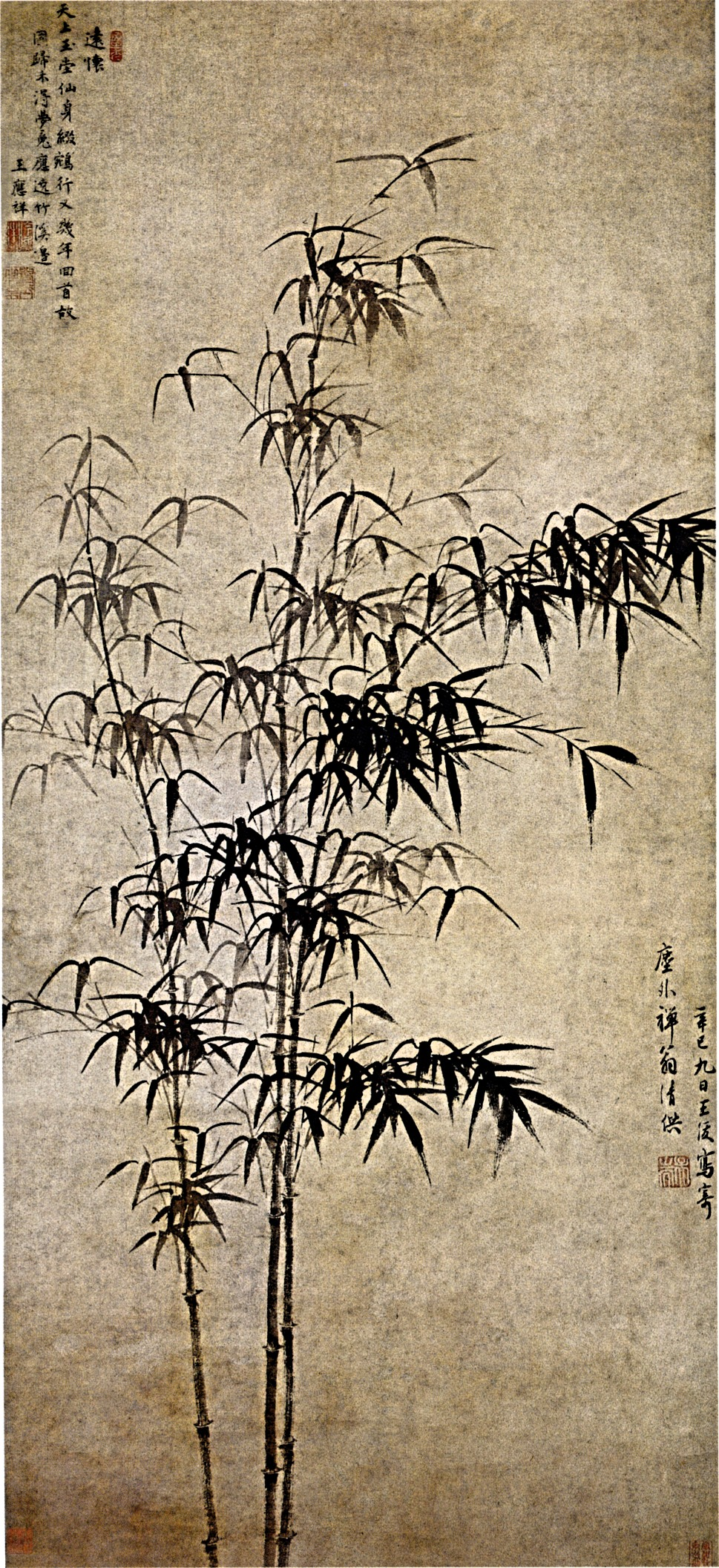
Ink Bamboo, Palace Museum, 1401

Wang Fu (simplified Chinese: 王绂; traditional Chinese: 王紱; pinyin: Wáng Fú; ca. 1362–1416), courtesy name Mengduan (孟端), art names Youshisheng (友石生) and Jiulong Shanren (九龍山人), was a Chinese landscape painter, calligrapher, and poet of the Ming dynasty.

Wang was born in Wuxi, Jiangsu. Wang's painting followed the style of Wang Meng and Ni Zan. Wang also painted ink bamboo works in a free and uninhibited style.
