= Wen Tong =

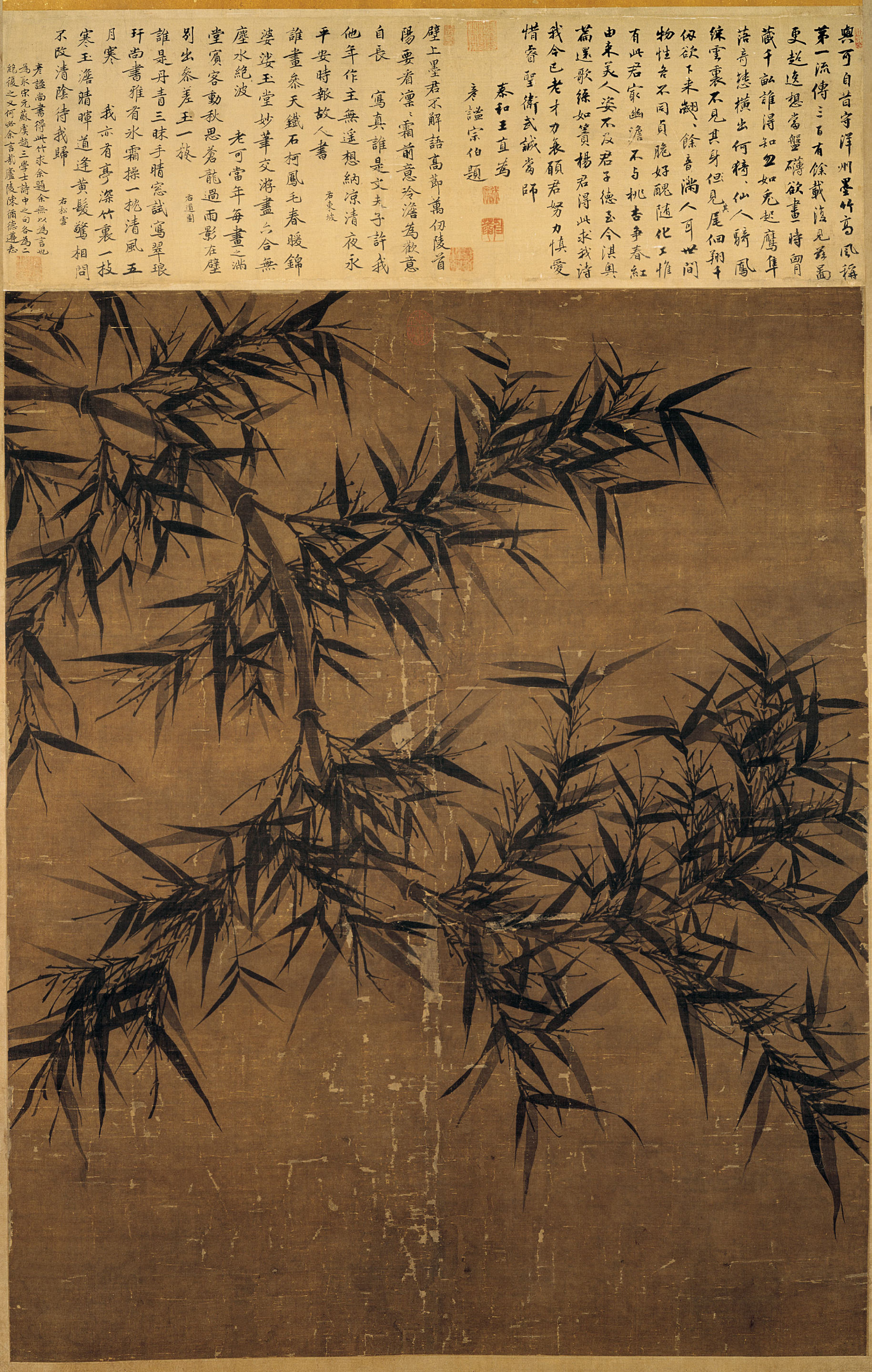
Bamboo in Monochrome Ink. National Palace Museum, Taiwan

Wen Tong (Chinese: 文同; pinyin: Wén Tóng; Wade–Giles: Wen T'ung) (1019–1079) was a Northern Song painter born in Sichuan famous for his ink bamboo paintings. He was one of the paragons of "scholar's painting" (shi ren hua), which idealised spontaneity and painting without financial reward.

He could hold two brushes in one hand and paint two different distanced bamboos simultaneously. One Chinese idiom in relation to him goes "there are whole bamboos in his heart" (胸有成竹), meaning that one has a well-thought-out plan in his mind.

As did many artists of his era, Wen Tong also wrote poetry. As attested in his poems, he had at least one golden-hair monkey (金丝狨) and a number of pet gibbons, whose graceful brachiation he admired. An elegy written by him upon the death of one of his gibbons has been preserved in the collection of his works.
