= Tosa Mitsunobu =

Japanese painter (1434–1525)

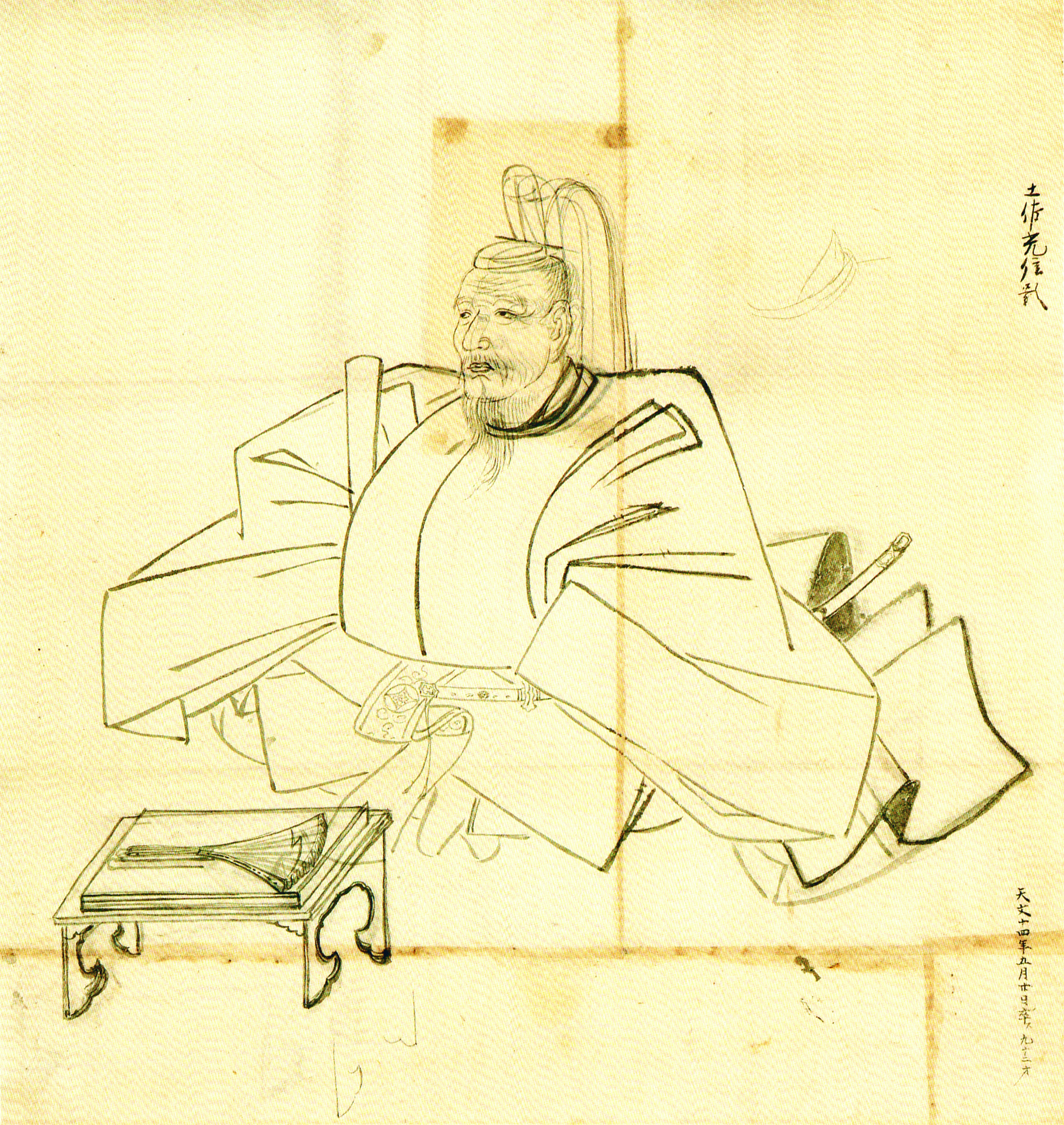

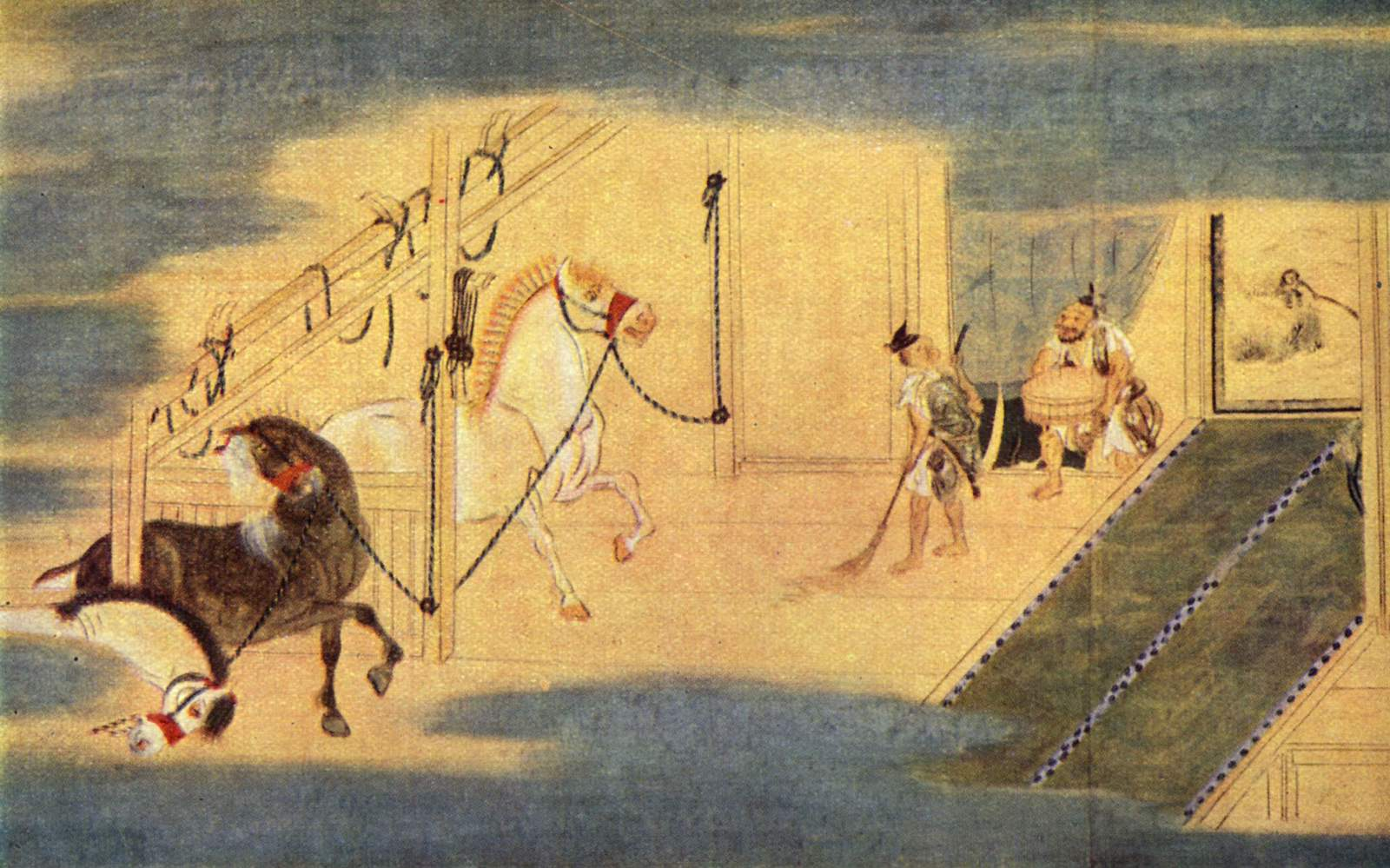
Detail, Seikōji engi emaki (Illustrated Legends of Seikōji), Tokyo National Museum

Tosa Mitsunobu (土佐 光信; 1434 – June 10, 1525) was a Japanese painter, the founder of the Tosa school of Japanese painting. Born into a family that had traditionally served as painters to the Imperial court, he was head of the court painting bureau from 1493 to 1496. In 1518, he was appointed chief artist to the Ashikaga shogunates.

== See also ==
- Bamboo in the Four Seasons; screen painting attributed to him in the Metropolitan Museum of Art
- Higashiyama Bunka in Muromachi period
