= Jiehua =

Chinese art genre featuring architecture

- Traditional Chinese: 界畫
- Simplified Chinese: 界画
Transcriptions
Standard Mandarin
- Hanyu Pinyin: jièhuà
- IPA: [tɕjê.xwâ]
Yue: Cantonese
- Yale Romanization: gaaiwá
- Jyutping: gaai3 waa6*2
- IPA: [kaj˧.wa˧˥]

Jiehua (simplified Chinese: 界画; traditional Chinese: 界畫) painting, sometimes translated as “border painting,” “boundary painting,” or “ruled-line painting,” is a field within Chinese visual art that describes paintings featuring detailed renderings of architecture with shan shui (mountains and rivers) backgrounds and figures, boats, and carts as embellishments. Referring to this style with the term jiehua instead of a direct translation is commonly agreed to be the most accurate, as the word jie (界) refers to a device called jiechi (界尺) which was a ruler with marks or grooves that helped Chinese painters draw the straight lines necessary to depict architectural detail. These paintings are characterized by their meticulous attention to detail, technical consideration, and mechanical perfection, distinguishing jiehua from other painting genres.

== Techniques, materials and tools ==
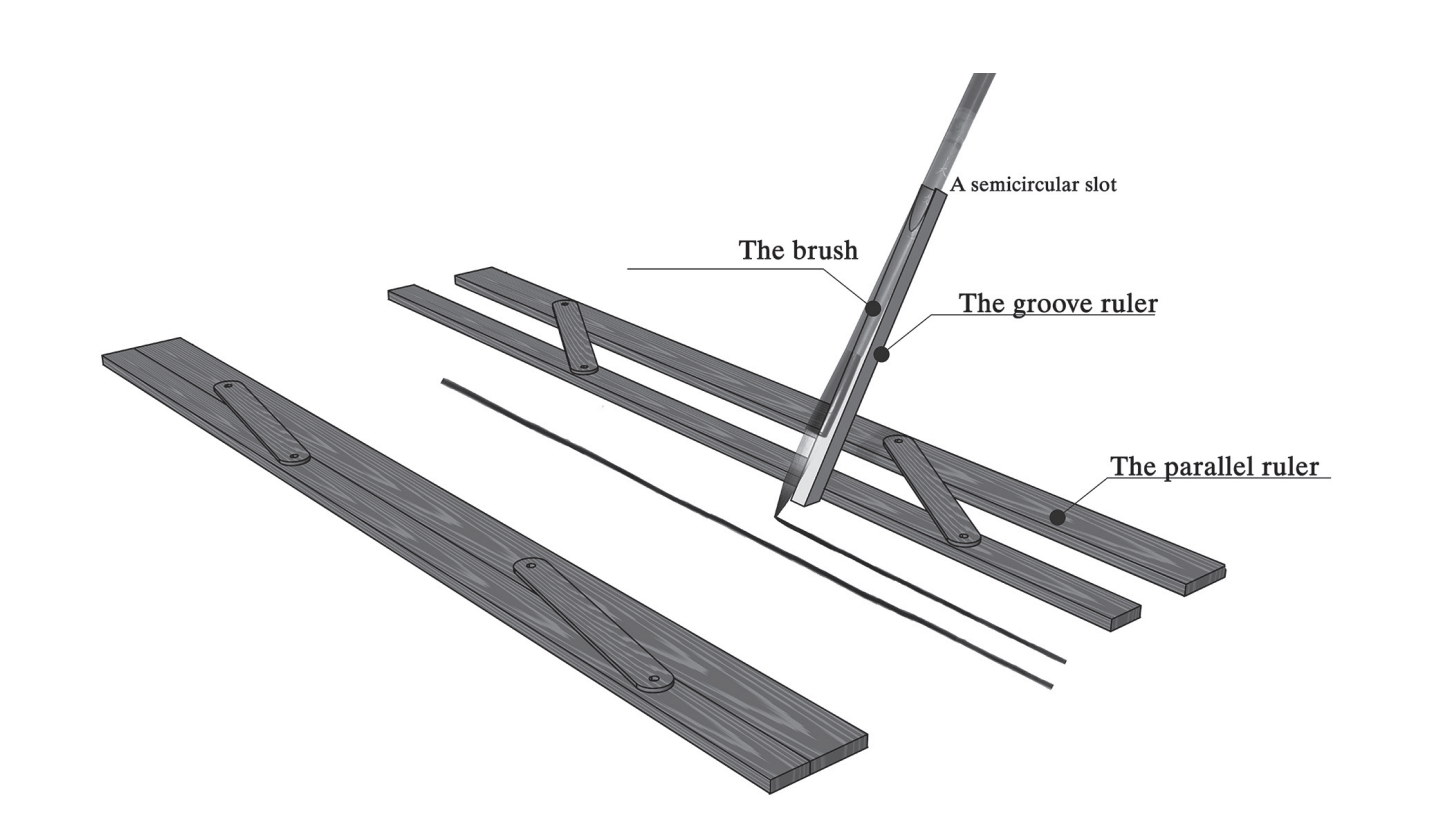
The use of jiehua devices.

Jiehua painters commonly utilized a tool called jiechi (界尺), a ruler marked with grooves, to guide their hands in creating precise straight lines needed for architectural detailing. Scholar Shen Kangshen 沈康身 attempted to reconstruct the historical usage of jiechi in a more generalized manner, relying on a Ming-era instrument. According to Shen, a complete set of jiehua tools consists of a parallel ruler (jiechi 界尺), a groove ruler (caochi 槽尺), and a brush (bi 笔). The parallel ruler comprises two straight edges affixed to two movable rods. By anchoring the lower edge and adjusting the angle between the rods and edges, the upper edge shifts to create parallel lines. The groove ruler, a squared-off stick featuring a semicircular slot, holds the brush tip. The painter affixes the bottom of the groove ruler to the upper edge of the parallel ruler. The other hand maintains the angles between the groove ruler and the parallel ruler, as well as between the groove ruler and the brush. The groove ruler can glide along the parallel ruler, guiding the brush to produce straight lines.

The use of the jiechi ruler and other tools was a common practice among jiehua artists, historical records also highlight several jiehua specialists who were known for their freehand techniques. During the Northern Song era, writer Guo Ruoxu 郭若虚 criticized his contemporaries for depending on rulers when discussing architectural subjects in his work Tuhua Jianwen Zhu (Paintings Seen and Heard 图画见闻志). He indicated that previous jiehua painters such as Guo Zhongshu 郭国宝 and Wang Shiyuan 王士元 did not use rulers, which he regarded as more admirable. Later Guo and Wang were both celebrated as experts of jiehua painting. This points to jiehua as an art form as defined not by the tools used but rather by style. Yuan scholar Rao Ziran 饶自然 reinforced this concept when discussing jiehua, stating, "Even if you do not use rulers, you should still consistently use the principles of jiehua to achieve it," reaching beyond the literal translation of "ruled-line painting." While jiehua as a genre emphasizes mechanical aids and subject categories, it recognizes itself as a painting style.

== Style and literati impact ==
Art historians’ descriptions of jiehua style emphasize the essential requirement of understanding Chinese construction techniques and standards. Four basic principles compose jiehua style: faultless calculation, structural clarity, correct scale, and mathematical and architectural knowledge. Records indicate that jiehua experts were able to create paintings with accuracy that met or even surpassed experienced craftsmen. An account in Yizhou Minghua Lu (益州名画录) about court painter Zhao Zhongyi 赵忠义 whose jiehua painting passed the inspection of a skilled architect supports this.

The tension between jiehua and craftsmanship led to consequences: its difficulty to master and a general disdain of the genre stemming from literati ideology. By the standard of ancient Chinese aesthetics, the Six Principles of Chinese painting (Liufa 六法) placed spirit resonance as the most significant element while the painting skills and artists’ practice were secondary. Jiehua contains many artificial aspects from theme to painting method and it requires fundamental knowledge of mathematics and architecture. Jiehua was considered more like an architectural drawing than an artwork, a quality that went against natural spirit resonance and nature’s beauty of literati ideals. In the early Eastern Jin dynasty, Gu Kaizhi 顧愷之 considered architectural artwork as static subjects lacking expressive ideas, and ranked it last amongst all other painting styles. The Tangchao Minghualu (Famous Paintings of the Tang Period 唐朝名画录) from the Tang dynasty similarly placed paintings depicting architecture at the bottom of the painting system. The same is true in the Yuan dynasty, following Tang Hou 汤垕's creation of the thirteen painting categories, jiehua found itself relegated to the lowest position. As the Yuan dynasty waned, jiehua's standing continued to diminish. Scholar Xu Qin 徐沁 from the Ming period, noted that the painters were viewed as inferior artisans.

In spite of their distaste for the style, the literati attempted to integrate jiehua into their painting conventions. In the Tang period, efforts were made by art historians to free architectural paintings from reliance on mechanical aids, such as Lidai Minghuaji (Famous Paintings Through History 历代名画记). The Song dynasty palace catalog Xuanhe Huapu (The Xuanhe Catalog of Paintings 宣和画谱) also differentiated between two categories of jiehua: an inferior one strictly governed by rules, and a superior one not restricted by them. Qing writer Zheng Ji 郑绩 transformed the meaning of jiehua, shifting its association from carpenter's tools to abstract principles. Zheng Ji also claimed, jiehua no longer signified reliance on rulers but rather underscored adherence to rules and laws. Although jiehua style’s association with the usage of rulers originated right from the outset, members of the literati sought to transform jiehua into a form compatible with conventional literati preferences.

Contemporary scholars assert that even when jiehua painters used rulers, their depictions of architecture are generally regarded as lacking in specificity or accuracy when compared to the existing buildings. At the same time, jiehua artworks featuring architectural subjects are acknowledged as providing valuable insights into building details, especially of structures no longer standing.

== History ==
=== Eastern Zhou Dynasty (770–221 BC) ===
The origins of jiehua can be traced back to as early as the Eastern Zhou Dynasty. Among the earliest possible practitioners of this art form was Jingjun 敬君, who was from the Qi state. Additionally, excavations of lacquerware in excavations in Linzi, Shandong depict architectural subjects, and provide a glimpse into architectural representation in the Eastern Zhou period.

=== Qin and Han Dynasties (221 BC – 220 AD) ===
Artifacts from Zhou dynasty showed the first occurrence of textual references to early manifestations of jiehua, but the Qin and Han dynasties have the earliest preserved drawings. During this period, depictions of houses, pavilions, and palaces began emerging on Han stone reliefs. The paintings of this time served primarily utilitarian and illustrative functions, exemplified by Zhang Yuanyin’s Records of Famous Paintings of the Past Dynasties 《历代名画记》. This shows jiehua’s early aesthetic principles, which emphasize precision and accuracy over the abstract impressionism that later characterized literati landscape traditions.

=== Wei, Jin, Northern and Southern Dynasties (220–589) ===
During the Wei, Jin, Northern and Southern dynasties, the scope of jiehua expanded beyond technical architectural drawings to incorporate scenery and environments. Although there are few surviving works from this period, many names of jiehua painters were recorded. The painter Yang Xiushan 杨修善 from the Cao Wei court created a landmark jiehua work called the Two Capitals 《两京图》, which depicts the splendor of the dual capitals of Luoyang and Chang'an. Buddhist temple architecture emerged as a prominent subject in jiehua during this period, coinciding with the spread of the religion. Craftsmen like Jiang Shaoyou 蒋少游 joined the ranks of jiehua painters. The integration of architectural knowledge into jiehua represents an evolution of the art form. During this period that the earliest records of jiehua being viewed as an inferior art form appear with Eastern Jin scholar Gu Kaizhi 顧愷之 ranking it as the lowest form.

=== Sui Dynasty (589–618) ===
The Sui dynasty constituted another period of evolution for jiehua. With Buddhism spreading, the Sui dynasty experienced a proliferation of Buddhist temple construction, providing new subjects for jiehua painting. Painters like Yang Qidan stood out for creating jiehua based on real, existing architecture, shifting the form toward realistic representation. On the technical side, the use of boundary rulers as tools to delineate architectural lines became more standard during the Sui dynasty.

=== Tang Dynasty (618–907) ===
The Tang dynasty, with its support of the arts, ushered in a golden age of jiehua. A famous jiehua that arose during this period are the Dunhuang murals. The Mogao Cave, which represents Tang architecture, is a good example. Few of these buildings still exist to this day. Aside from the murals, painters like Yin Jizhao introduced new architectural, mathematical techniques, and knowledge to jiehua creation. Another painter, Yan Liben, was one of the first to depict automotive architectural structures in his jiehua paintings, such as carts and chariots. The thematic scope of jiehua continued its growth of incorporating landscape and human figures, like “Jiangfan Pavilion Picture” 《江帆楼阁图》 by Li Sixun 李思训. Paintings such as the “Jiangfan Pavilion Picture” demonstrate increased depictions of secular, everyday themes, alongside the Buddhist and other religious imagery.

=== Five Dynasties (907–960) ===
The disruptions of the Five Dynasties era constituted another period of change for jiehua. Wei Xian's “Water Mill” 《闸口盘车图》 and Hu Yi's works exemplified jiehua painting during this time. The range of jiehua expanded beyond wall paintings and scrolls into new mediums like textiles for daily use. The Five Dynasties continued the Tang legacy of skilled craftsmen producing jiehua.

=== Song Dynasty (960–1279) ===
Jiehua painting as a distinct artistic category emerged during the Southern Song period. The Southern Song Capital of Lin’an, modern-day Hangzhou, served as the period’s primary art center. This was thanks to the influence of artists from nearby Wuxing, its sway as a capital city, and being confluence of cultural exchange. Examples of these works were found in palaces or temples with its subjects ranging from ancient tales to objects from the natural world.

Court patronage for jiehua peaked in the Northern Song period, exemplified by Along the River During Qingming Festival 《清明上河图》. Historian Wen Chien-Cheng suggests that the renaissance of jiehua painting in the Northern Song Dynasty may be attributed to the prominence of landscape paintings and appreciation of realism. The surviving jiehua works from the Southern Song period portray close-ups of structures which were “often juxtaposed with voids that suggest distance and atmospheric mood," an adoption of Southern literati landscape features.

=== Yuan Dynasty (1279–1368) ===
During the Yuan dynasty, jiehua replaced other names of depictions of architectural subjects and man-made objects, such as the term wumu which describes “wooden constructions” and features subjects of boats and carts. At this time jiehua remained popular with court patronage and consumer demand, but not literati circles. Around 100 jiehua artworks from the Yuan dynasty survive. These paintings showcase the artists’ attention to detail and new jiehua traditions, like the baimiao technique. Line drawing without shading and a modular approach for the rearranging of standardized components within a composition also appeared.

The Yuan dynasty experienced a shift in the preferential materials used for jiehua painting. Favored among literati scholars, silk became a popular medium for painting, used by around forty-eight percent of paintings in museum collections. As in the Southern Song period, Hangzhou continued to serve as a hotspot for artistic ingenuity of jiehua during the Yuan period. In 1284, the Mongols instituted the Maritime Trade Supervisorate, placing Hangzhou as a center for international trade, which resulted in the exportation jiehua paintings to neighboring countries.

=== Ming (1368–1644) ===
In the transition between the Yuan and Ming periods, jiehua declined in status. Anita Chung notes, “unlike their predecessors, almost no jiehua specialists of the Ming are recorded in literature as having achieved faultless calculation and the right proportion." This can be attributed to a decline in imperial patronage, an emphasis on technical skill, and increasing popularity of literati paintings. The Ming period oversaw shifts in jiehua technique, with artists favoring smaller, more delicate representations, instead of “structural clarity” of entire buildings juxtaposed with a mountainous landscape. This shift is represented in Qiu Ying’s paintings of this time, like Spring Morning in the Han Palace and the Jiucheng Palace.

=== Qing (1644–1911) ===
The Qing dynasty marked a resurgence in production of jiehua paintings. Many surviving examples of jiehua during this period are court paintings. The artist’s social status would be raised by their work and would allow them to interact with other wealthy potential patrons. Paintings commissioned by those in the court would emphasize material possessions and feature subjects such as “ritual spaces, places and cities”. Artworks commissioned by the merchant class would feature gardens as a way to showcase their high social standings. Another important detail during this period was the influence of European art. Throughout the Qing period, jiehua artists working within the court were introduced to European art by visiting missionaries. These missionary travelers introduced techniques in linear perspective and shading which allowed for more realism.

=== Modern (1911–present) ===
After the fall of imperial China, jiehua descended into obscurity. It was not until the turn of the 21st century that a resurgence in interest by contemporary Chinese artists appeared. On the traditional front artist Zhang Xiayong is known for resurrecting traditional practices of jiehua creation. Zhang gained recognition through his work Fanlou Art Market. This piece demonstrates fine line brushwork and his an emphasis on the revival of traditional artistic techniques (大赏艺术). His study of architecture aligns his work with the detailed architectural renderings of traditional jiehua, while also embodying a linear perspective seen in many Western paintings, popularized in Qing dynasty jiehua. Some artists have begun experimenting with different media while still retaining aspects of jiehua tradition. One example is in “ceramic jiehua landscapes” (陶瓷界画山水). They also incorporate traditional jiehua practices against a shan shui backdrop, while opting for freehand brushwork to “express the traditional humanistic spirit" over the ancient traditional toolset.

== Artists and artworks ==
=== Sui Dynasty ===
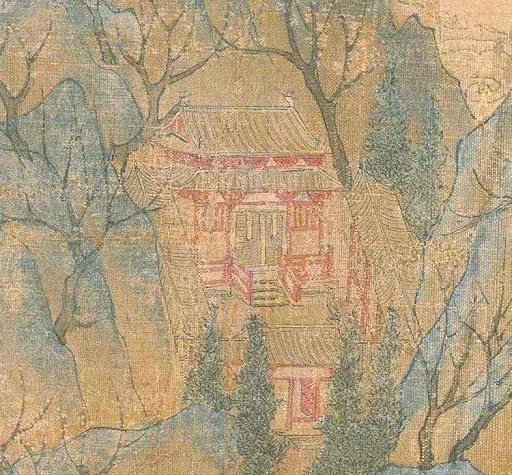
Spring Excursion (游春图) by Zhan Ziqian (展子虔)

==== “Spring Excursion” 《游春图》by Zhan Ziqian 展子虔 ====
Zhan Ziqian was a painter living through the transitional phases of the Northern Qi and Northern Zhou Dynasties and Sui dynasty. His artistic prowess served as a foundation for the subsequent evolution of jiehua paintings. His only surviving work, Spring Excursion, deviated from the architectural images displayed in stone reliefs from earlier dynasties, instead incorporating landscape themes with well rendered structures nestled within the landscape. It was the use of fine brushwork to create intricate architectural designs that led to the emergence of jiehua’s defining trait of architectural precision and detail.

=== Tang Dynasty ===
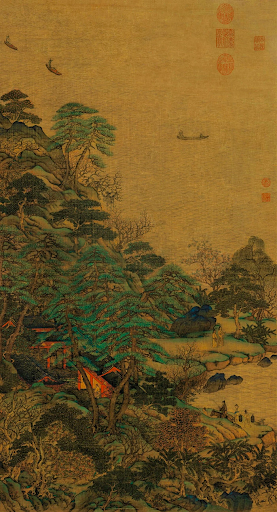
Jiangfan Pavilion (江帆楼阁图) by Li Sixun (李思训)

==== “Jiangfan Pavilion” 《江帆楼阁图》 by Li Sixun 李思训 ====
During the earlier days of jiehua, the art form was influenced by color palette, figure painting, landscape depictions, and architectural design. One noteworthy contributor to Tang dynasty jiehua was Li Sixun, who made an impact by framing landscapes as a prominent focal point. This was a style influenced by Zhan Ziqian, whose work, Jiangfan Pavilion, shows this shift towards landscapes over architectural structures. Li Sixun’s use of 唐三彩, the three colors of Tang (green, yellow, and white), boats, and figures in his jiehua cemented these as common features. The placement of boats in the upper corners of the painting introduced a tangible sense of distance and depth absent in earlier jiehua.

==== “Wangchuan Villa” 《辋川图》and “Snowy Stream” 《雪溪图》by Wang Wei 王维 ====
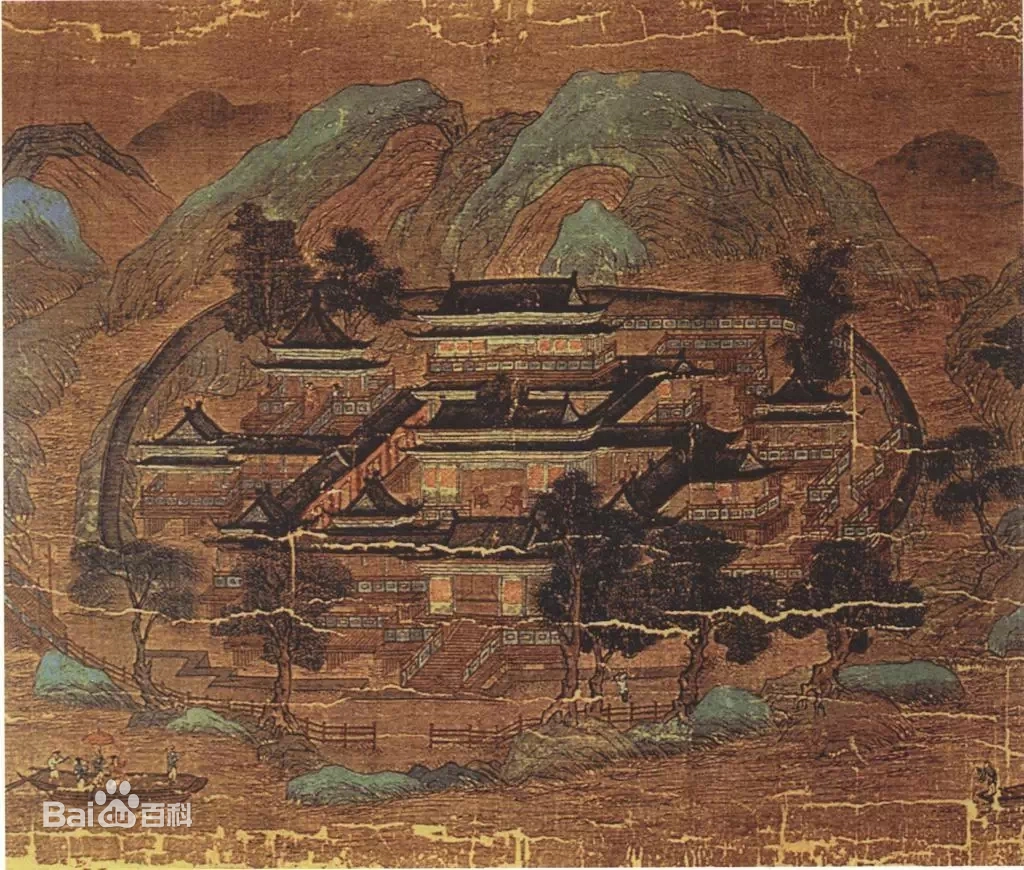
Wangchuan Villa painting (辋川图) by Wang Wei 王维

Wang Wei, a figure and known as one of the Four Greatest Artists during the Tang period, produced several jiehua pieces. His piece “Wangchuan Villa” depicts his own residence in detail against a prominent 山水 landscape background. Adorned with the distinctive Tang sancai 唐三彩 (green, white, and yellow) (Chen ye), the hues are emblematic of Tang dynasty jiehua art. While Wang Wei painted a variety of subjects and used many painting styles, with his jiehua, he either painted with the sancai 唐三彩 colors, as seen in “Wangchuan Villa,” or in ink monochrome (shuimo), as seen in multiple pieces such as “Snowy Stream” 《雪溪图》.

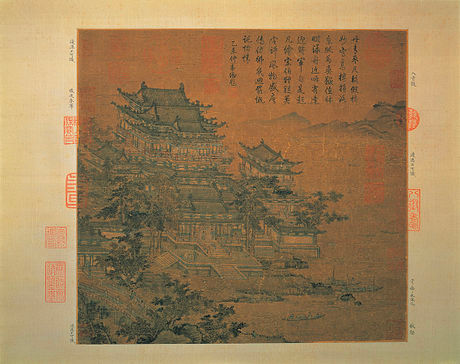
Luoyang Tower (洛阳楼图) by Li Zhaodao (李昭道)

==== “Luoyang Tower” 《洛阳楼图》by Li Zhaodao 李昭道 ====
Li Zhaodao, the son of the famous jiehua painter Li Sixun, distinguished himself from Tang dynasty jiehua artists. His work “Luoyang Tower” showcases an arranged complex of pavilions and buildings, creating a sense of symmetry along the work's central axis. As a reflection of established jiehua conventions and a direct influence of his father, who was also an artist, Luoyang Tower incorporates human figures and a 山水 background.

=== Five Dynasties Dynasty ===
==== “Water Mill” 《闸口盘车图》by Wei Xian 卫贤 ====
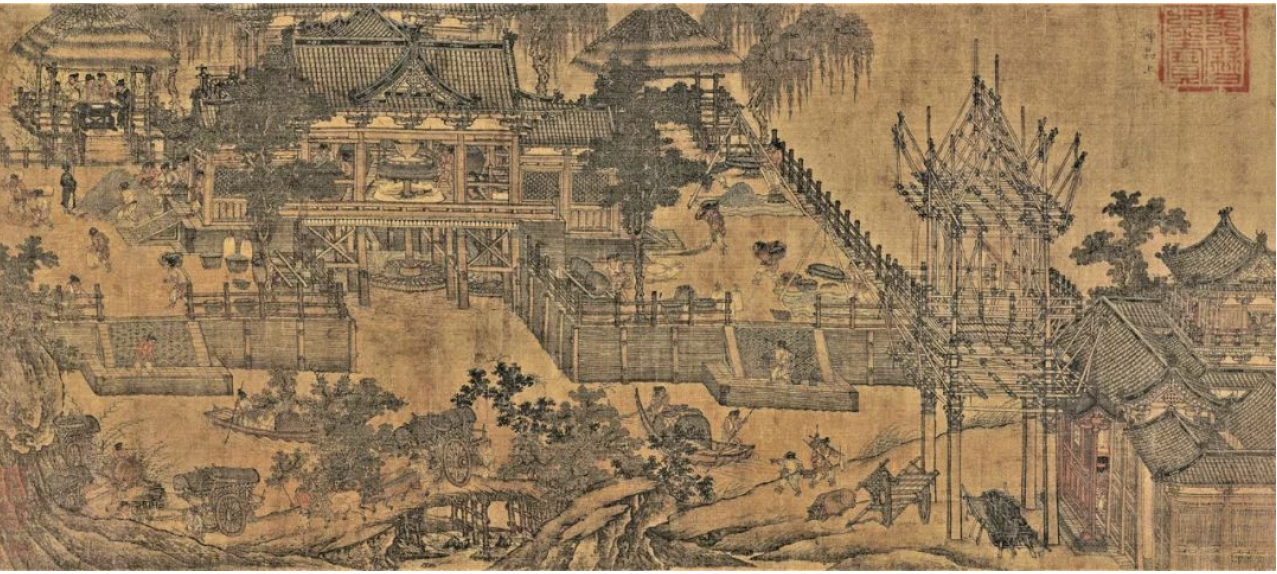
Water Mill (闸口盘车图) by Wei Xian 卫贤 (Five Dynasties)

During the Five Dynasties and Northern Song period, jiehua style focused on the integration of diverse landscapes, both rural and urban, while emphasizing the accuracy and details of structures. Wei Xian was a painter from this time from Jingzhao who is known for “Water Mill,” which shows decorative timbers and a wooden tavern by the main building of the water mill itself. There is also a depiction of a government water mill at the river's entrance, including the entire milling process. The painting is regarded an achievement in architectural painting, influencing other jiehua like Along the River during Qingming Festival.

=== Northern Song ===
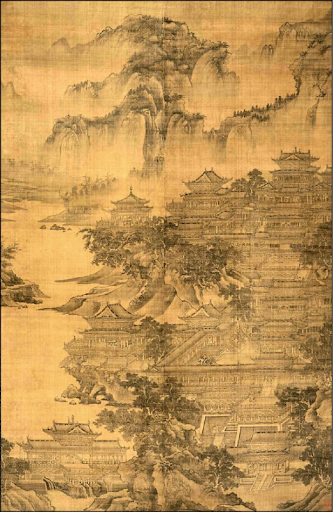
Summer Palace of Emperor Ming (明皇避暑宮) by Guo Zhongshu (郭忠恕)

==== “Summer Palace of Emperor Ming” 《明皇避暑宮》by Guo Zhongshu 郭忠恕 ====
Guo Zhongshu, a figure of the Five Dynasties period and Song dynasty, was a practitioner of the freehand technique and is known as one of the most well known jiehua to have lived. He is known for versatility in painting landscapes, architectural structures, and figures. His works prominently features palaces, pavilions, and houses. His style incorporated rich structure, center strokes, a flow without sharp corners, expressive lines, and attention to penmanship, connections, lines, and shading. Monochrome ink was popular among jiehua artists at the time, which influenced Zhongshu. His painting “Summer Palace of Emperor Ming” exemplifies this. Guo is also known for warning another architect of Northern Song, Yu Hao, of an error in Yu’s pagoda design based solely on a miniature model. Yu was grateful for this.

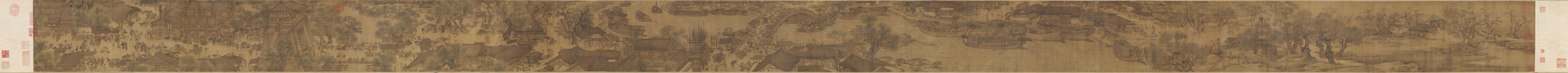
“Along the River during Qingming Festival” (清明上河图) by Zhang Zeduan 张择端 in the Northern Song Dynasty

==== “Along the River during Qingming Festival” 《清明上河图》by Zhang Zeduan 张择端 ====
Zhang Zeduan was a Song dynasty landscape painter famed for his iconic piece “Along the River during Qingming Festival," dubbed “China’s Mona Lisa." The artwork portrays urban life during the Qingming Festival, as well as cultural and historical elements. The scroll is more than seventeen feet long and depicts everyday activities, featuring bustling markets, transactions at shops, social gatherings, boat journeys, and horseback rides. This work inspired jiehua artists of subsequent dynasties, even as late as the Qing period, with hundreds of replicas and forgeries of well-regarded copies made, each following the overall composition and the theme of the original.

=== Yuan Dynasty ===
==== “Dragon Boat Regatta” 《龙舟夺标图》by Wang Zhenpeng 王振鹏 ====
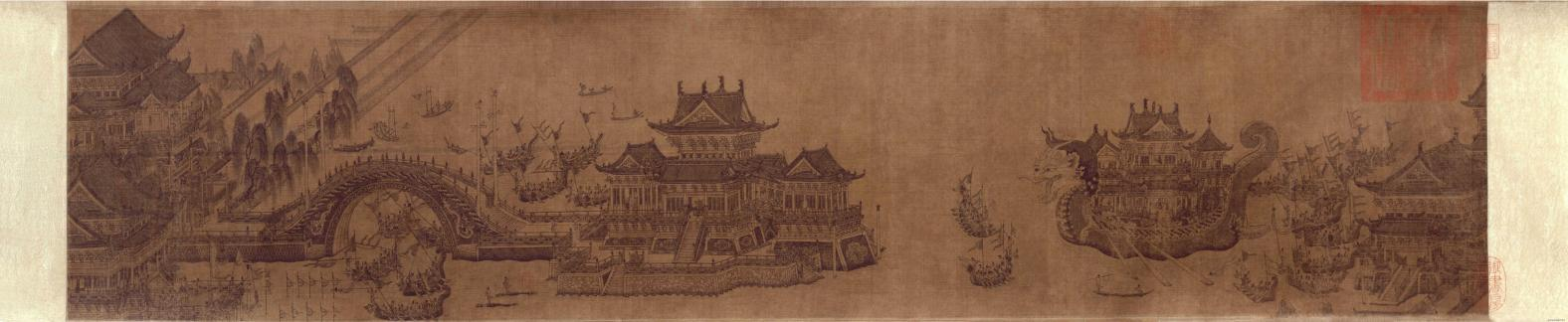
Dragon Boat Regatta (龙舟夺标图) by Wang Zhenpeng 王振鹏

Wang Zhenpeng was from Wenzhou in Zhejiang and is recognized as a jiehua expert during the Yuan dynasty. His skills earned him the title "弧云处士" from Emperor Renzong. He was influenced by Guo Zhongshu's painting techniques and also inherited the Southern Song emphasis on cantilever and parallel lines, as seen in Dragon Boat Regatta. His techniques included flexibly arranged modular motifs and polished ink lines. Wang Zhenpeng presented his jiehua to the throne and was placed into a high office position by the emperor. He became a celebrated artist of the Yuan court, and even after Wang disappeared from the stage of art during Renzong’s reign, his pupils—such as Li Rongjin, Wei Jiuding, and Zhu Yu—and other followers continued to carry forward his style.

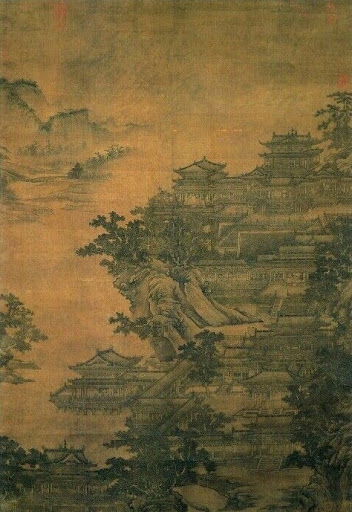
Hanyuan Picture (汉苑图) by Li Rongjin (李容瑾)

==== “Hanyuan Picture” 《汉苑图》by Li Rongjin 李容瑾 ====
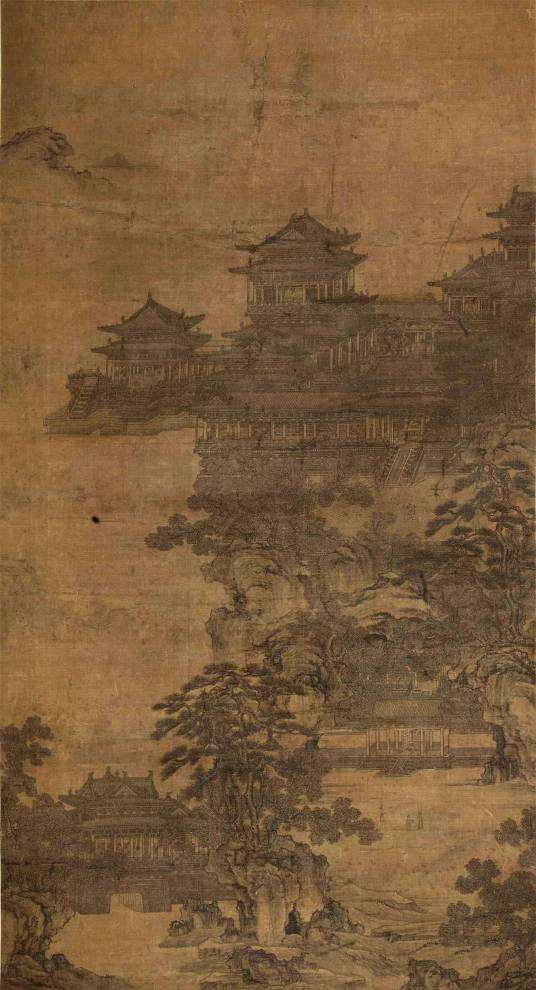
Hanyuan Picture (汉苑图) by Li Rongjin 李容瑾

Li Rongjin, a landscape painter of the Yuan dynasty, was a student of Wang Zhenpeng. Influenced by Zhenpeng, he blended both freehand and rule-lined techniques. Li Rongjin's Hanyuan Picture shows the influence of the Northern Song landscape tradition, associated with Li Cheng and Guo Xi. The painting features misty hills by a flowing river, eroded riverbanks, and trees, Rocks in the foreground, shaped like rolling clouds, represent Li-Guo motifs. Though Li Rongjin’s architectural landscape Hanyuan Tu partly borrows Li Cheng’s style of rocks and trees, and other Northern Song large-scale compositions, he reconciles Li Cheng’s perspective treatment by establishing a consistent point of view. This work, as well as others, from Li Rongjin served as inspiration for later jiehua artists.

==== “Yellow Pavilion” 《黄鹤楼图》by Xia Yong 夏永 ====
Xia Yong, another artist from the Yuan era, is known for his technique known as "open-embroidery," which disappeared during the Ming dynasty. He established a modular system and a tradition of plain-drawing that was innovative for the time. Yong's artworks exhibit modularity, the art of arranging modular components to construct architectural images. All bracket sets in his depiction of the Yellow Pavilion are a successive duplication of the exact same set, without any variance or blemishes that might be present in a more realistic depiction of a building. Yong’s modularity in the painting also presents the roof ridge ornaments in a more abstract and standardized fashion compared to earlier traditional jiehua depictions. There is also a simplification of structures, such as the complex network of cantilevers. His reuse of modules impacted subsequent jiehua trends.

=== Ming Dynasty ===
==== “Enjoying Antiquities”《玩古图》by Du Jin 杜堇 ====
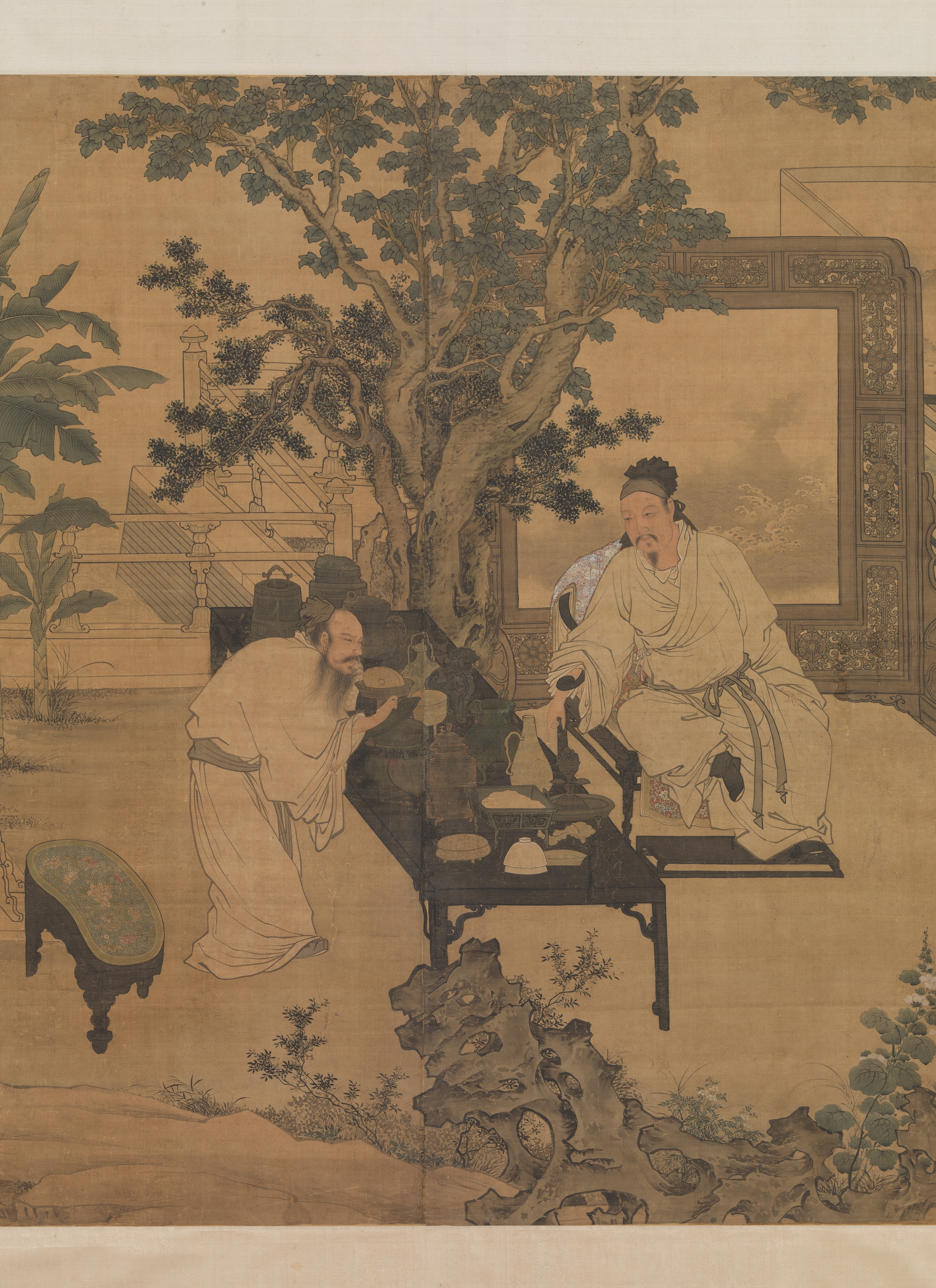
Enjoying Antiquities (玩古图) by Du Jin 杜堇

Du Jin was from Dantu who rose to prominence in Ming dynasty painting, known for jiehua and landscapes. Since jiehua declined in popularity in the Ming era, Du Jin, along with his contemporaries, shifted their focus to intricate representations in small, interior spaces. Enjoying Antiquity is an example of this. Du Jin’s work emphasized figures and relegated architectural structures to the background. In contrast to the resurgence of colorful palettes in Ming dynasty artwork, Du Jin continued the Yuan-jiehua tradition of the monochrome "baimiao" technique. His appreciation for the fine-line style of Southern Song painters showcased his artistic range as a jiehua artist.

==== “Spring Morning in the Han Palace” 《汉宫春晓图》and “The Jiucheng Palace” 《九成宫》by Qiu Ying 仇英 ====
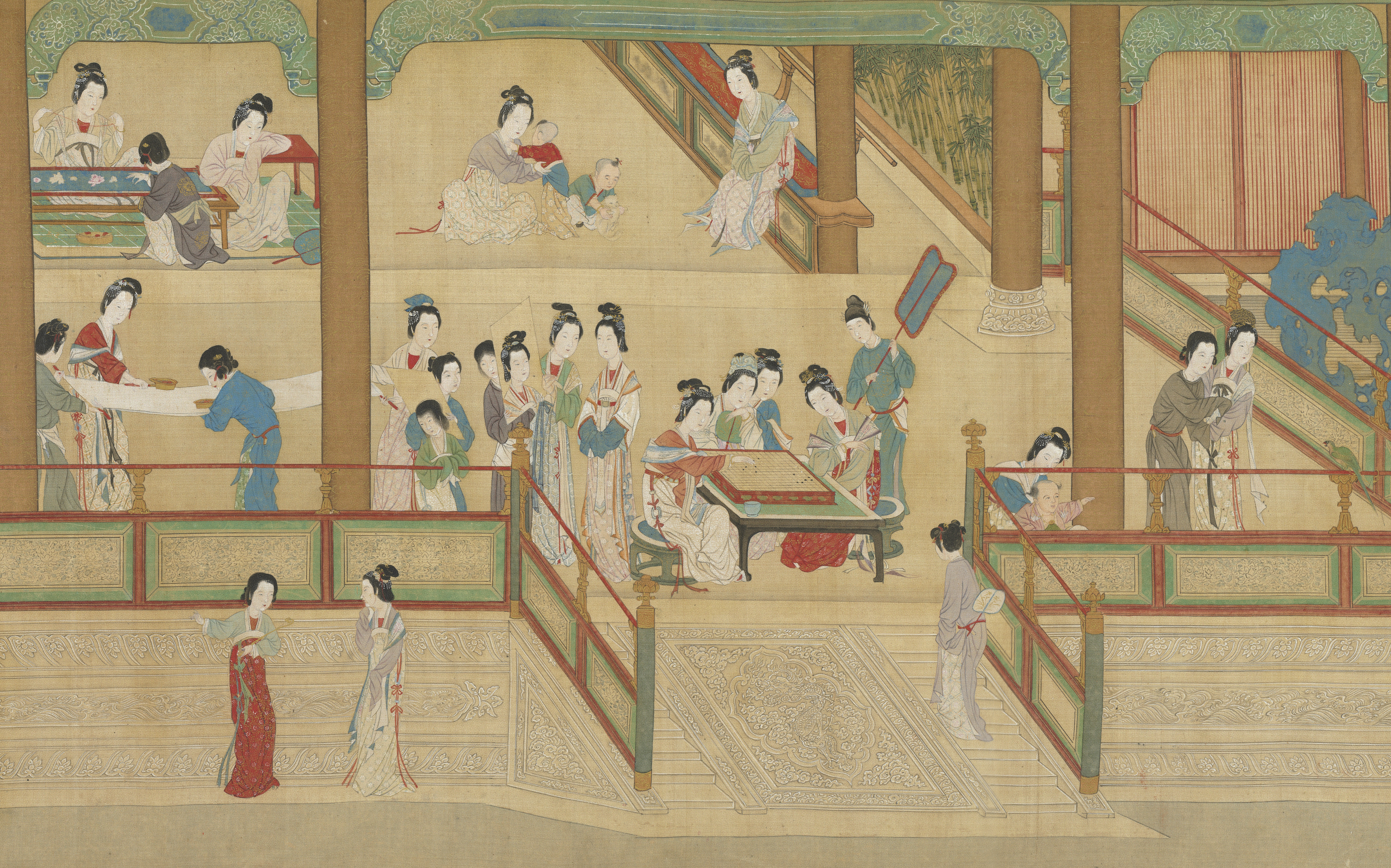
Spring Morning in the Han Palace (汉宫春晓图) by Qiu Ying 仇英

Qiu Ying came from Taicang and is known as one of the “Four Masters of the Wu School” (吴门四家). He was influenced by Zhuo Chen, nurtured Ying’s talent. He started with the copying of masterpieces from the Tang and Song dynasties and produced jiehua that aligned with more traditional jiehua representations of extant buildings, as seen in The Jiucheng Palace. His style also aligned with newer Ming trends of intimate and detailed scenes within small, interior spaces, as seen in Spring Morning in the Han Palace. All of his work is known for a vivid color palette.

=== Qing Dynasty ===
==== “Agarwood Pavilion” 《沉香亭图》by Yuan Jiang 袁江 ====
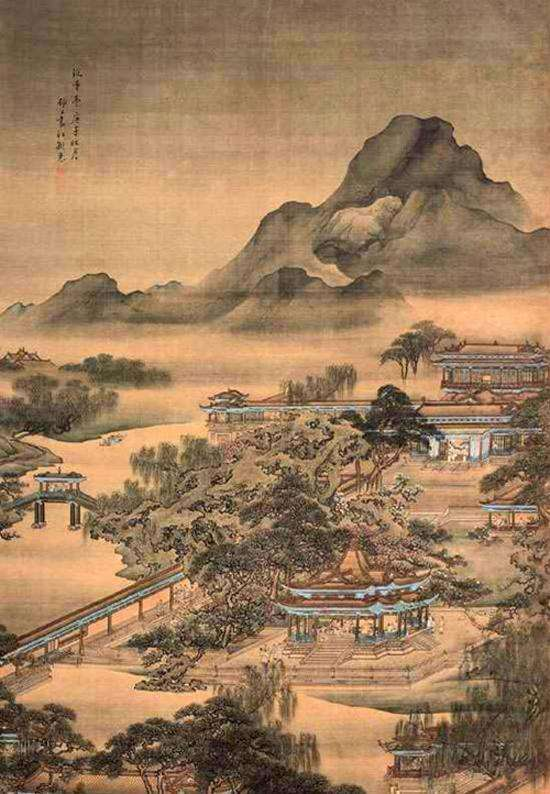
Agarwood Pavilion Picture (沉香亭图) by Yuan Jiang 袁江

Yuan Jiang was from Jiangdu, Jiangsu and lived during the early Qing dynasties. Due to the unpopularity of jiehua during the Ming period, information about practitioners leading up to the early Qing is scarce, leaving little known about his life and artwork. Qing-era jiehua saw an influx of Western influence on linear perspective, shading, and spatial awareness. This is evident in Agarwood Pavilion, one of Yuan’s works. He frequently enhanced the height and form of the roofs of his architectural subjects to instill majesty and emphasized decoration with roofs and bridges. In his rendition of the Agarwood Pavilion, Yuan rendered the building without direct reference, adding rich colors that set it apart from traditional jiehua that focused on realistic portrayals.

==== “Peach Garden” 《桃源图》and “Shanshui Courtyard Strip Screen” 《山水庭院条屏》by Yuan Yao 袁耀 ====
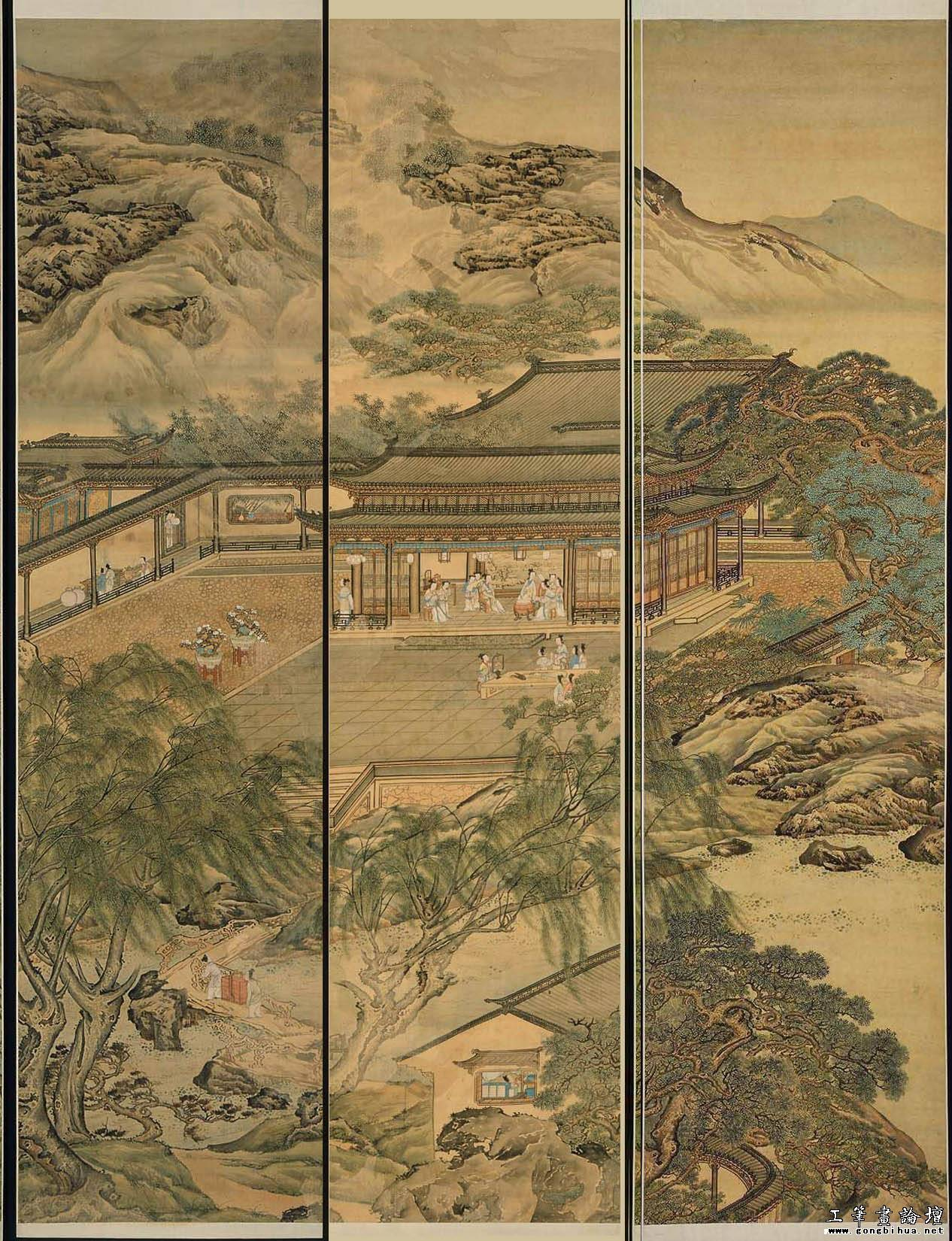
Landscape Courtyard Strip Screen (山水庭院条屏) by Yuan Yao 袁耀

Yuan Yao was a jiehua painting during the Qing dynasty, who became known for his landscape art and depiction of birds and flowers. He remained in obscurity because records often erroneously conflated his name with Yuan Jiang, a fellow artist. He was also related Yuan Jiang, raising speculation among scholars about their precise relationship - potentially uncle and nephew or father and son. The first documentation of Yao’s name is in 画人补遗, dating to the Qianlong period. His works are known for linear perspective, shading, and spatial awareness of architectural elements in pieces. Peach Garden and the Shanshui Courtyard Strip Screen demonstrate these architectural elements.

==== “Landscapes”《山水》by Jiao Bingzhen 焦秉贞 ====
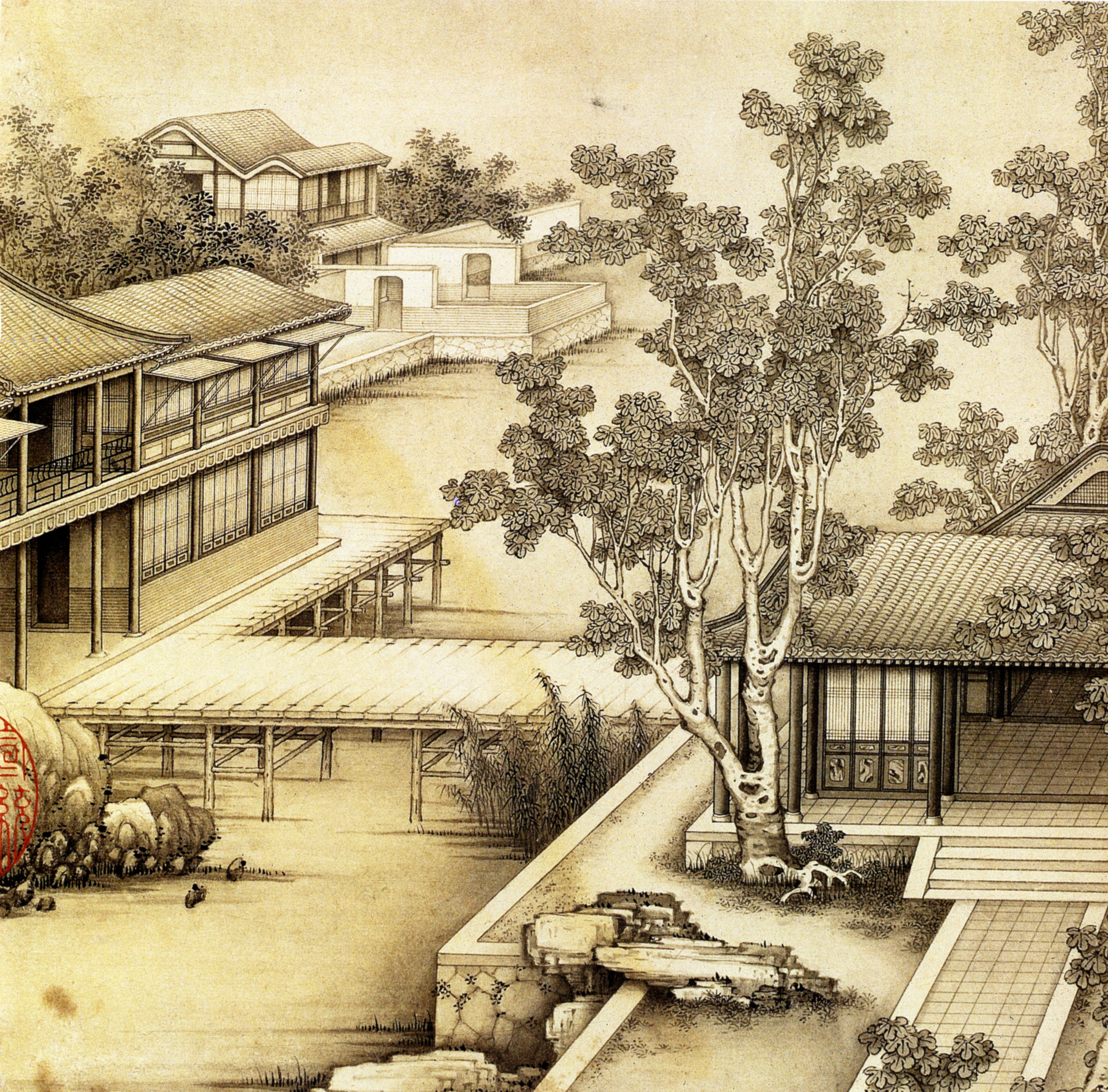
Landscapes (山水) by Jiao Bingzhen 焦秉贞

Jiao Bingzhen, born in Jining, Shandong, was a Qing dynasty painter, known for being the first Qing dynasty artist to integrate traditional Chinese jiehua painting with Western painting elements. Bingzhen was a polymath, excelling as both a painter and a scientist. His artistic approach combined tilting, single built-in aerial perspective, and careful brushwork with Western techniques, integrating distant horizons and spatial perspective into his works. This can be seen in Landscapes. Bingzhen's fusion showcases another evolution of jiehua in the Qing dynasty before the art form’s collapse into obscurity with the fall of imperial China.

== Influence in East Asia ==
While jiehua production was primarily driven by local demand, it was also in demand abroad. In the sixteenth century, jiehua painter Xia Yong's name appeared in Japanese sources along with some of his paintings and imitations. The Yueyang Pavilion owned by Masamune Tokusaburō and the Palace by the River in the Jinyuan Zhai collection have either survived or circulated in Japan. Another jiehua piece imitating Li Rongjin’s Han Palace was collected by the Osaka City Museum of Fine Arts and became popular in Japan. A number of copies of Along the River During Qingming Festival 清明上河图 and works of Qiu Ying existed in Korean Joseon collections.

When jiehua pieces first entered the overseas market remains unclear. The establishment of the Maritime Trade Supervisorate in Hangzhou in 1284 linked it to Qingyuan (modern-day Ningbo), a major harbor for trade with Japan. Japanese monks and merchants actively sought paintings in the art markets of Hangzhou and Ningbo during the Yuan-Ming transition. In the early Ming period, records show that Ashikaga Yoshimasa sent envoys to acquire Chinese artworks. It was common for Japanese painters to travel to China learn about painting techniques and styles, which included jiehua. There is evidence that jiehua circulated across Korea, with Joseon envoys from Korea during the Qing period frequently acquiring jiehua both from Qing court painters. They used them as templates for their own Korean court paintings. In spite of the influence of literati artistic tastes, jiehua thrived. As an art form, it permeated both local and overseas markets, influencing the artistic styles of China’s neighboring countries in the fourteenth through nineteenth centuries.

A specific example of jiehua on Japanese art is the Kano School of Painting. The school’s style merged aspects of traditional Chinese painting with traditional Japanese painting. Kano School pieces like Scenes in and around Kyoto feature architecture drawn in a style reminiscent of jiehua from that time period. In Scenes in and around Kyoto there are distinct Japanese artistic qualities like the gold leaf clouds shrouding the city and intense use of color, but it still bears a resemblance to copies of Along the River During Qingming Festival. These are recognized as Qiu Ying’s style, dating the piece to the late 1500s, much earlier than Scenes in and Around Kyoto (from the early 1600’s). Comparing both paintings side by side reveals that the Japanese work maintains the same linear perspective, composition, precision, and calculation of lines used in the detailed architectural renderings. All of which are defining qualities of jiehua artwork.

The influence of jiehua on Korean art is illustrated in the Screen of Han Palace and other paintings known as Towers and Pavilions and Palace in Sumptuous Colors. These Korean works depict architecture reminiscent of Chinese palaces against a landscape background. They were used for decoration of the Joseon palace complexes for their symbolism of the peaceful, prosperous society of ancient Chinese dynasties. The architecture in these pieces are not necessarily a realistic depiction of historical Han imperial palaces and structures, but rather an imaginary representation of buildings imitating Chinese pavilions. Using idealized depiction of Chinese architectural elements references the jiehua modular system from the Yuan period with roots extending back to the Tang period.
