= Jin Tingbiao =

- Born: Unknown; Wucheng, Huzhou
- Died: 1767; Beijing
- Occupation: Painter

Chinese name
- Traditional Chinese: 金廷標
- Simplified Chinese: 金廷标
Transcriptions
Standard Mandarin
- Hanyu Pinyin: Jīn Tíngbiāo
- Wade–Giles: Chin^{1} T'ing^{2}-piao^{1}

Courtesy name
- Chinese: 士揆
Transcriptions
Standard Mandarin
- Hanyu Pinyin: Shìkuí

Jin Tingbiao (Chinese: 金廷標, died 1767), courtesy name Shikui, was a Chinese painter of the Qing dynasty, who served in the court of the Qianlong Emperor.

== Biography ==
Jin Tingbiao was a southern Chinese from Wucheng (烏程) in Huzhou. He was active between 1720 and 1760. He was summoned to the imperial court in Beijing after submitting his Album of Lohan in the Baimiao Style in 1757, during the Qianlong Emperor's second southern inspection tour. The emperor valued his works and often inscribed on them.

Jin Tingbiao specialized in figural and architectural subjects and was famous for his illustrations of historical legends. He was a prominent member of the Ruyi Institute, the Qing academy of court painters, along with Jiao Bingzhen, Leng Mei, Yu Zhiding, Tang Dai, Yuan Jiang, and Yuan Yao.

After his death in 1767, the Qianlong Emperor ordered his tieluo (貼落; "affixed hanging") paintings from palace walls to be remounted and entered into his personal catalog, the Shiqu baoji. He also gave Jin a seventh-ranked official title, but it's unclear whether it was made before his death.

== Gallery ==
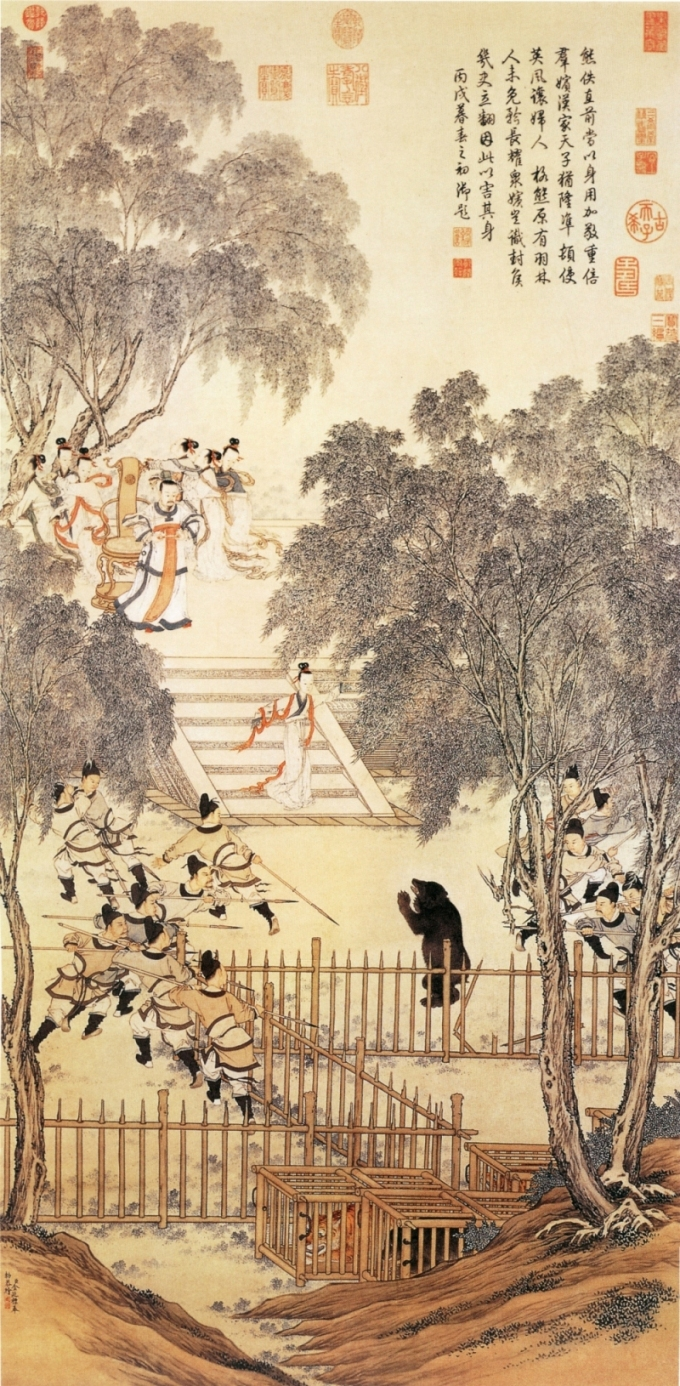
Jieyu Blocking a Bear (婕妤擋熊圖), Palace Museum, Beijing

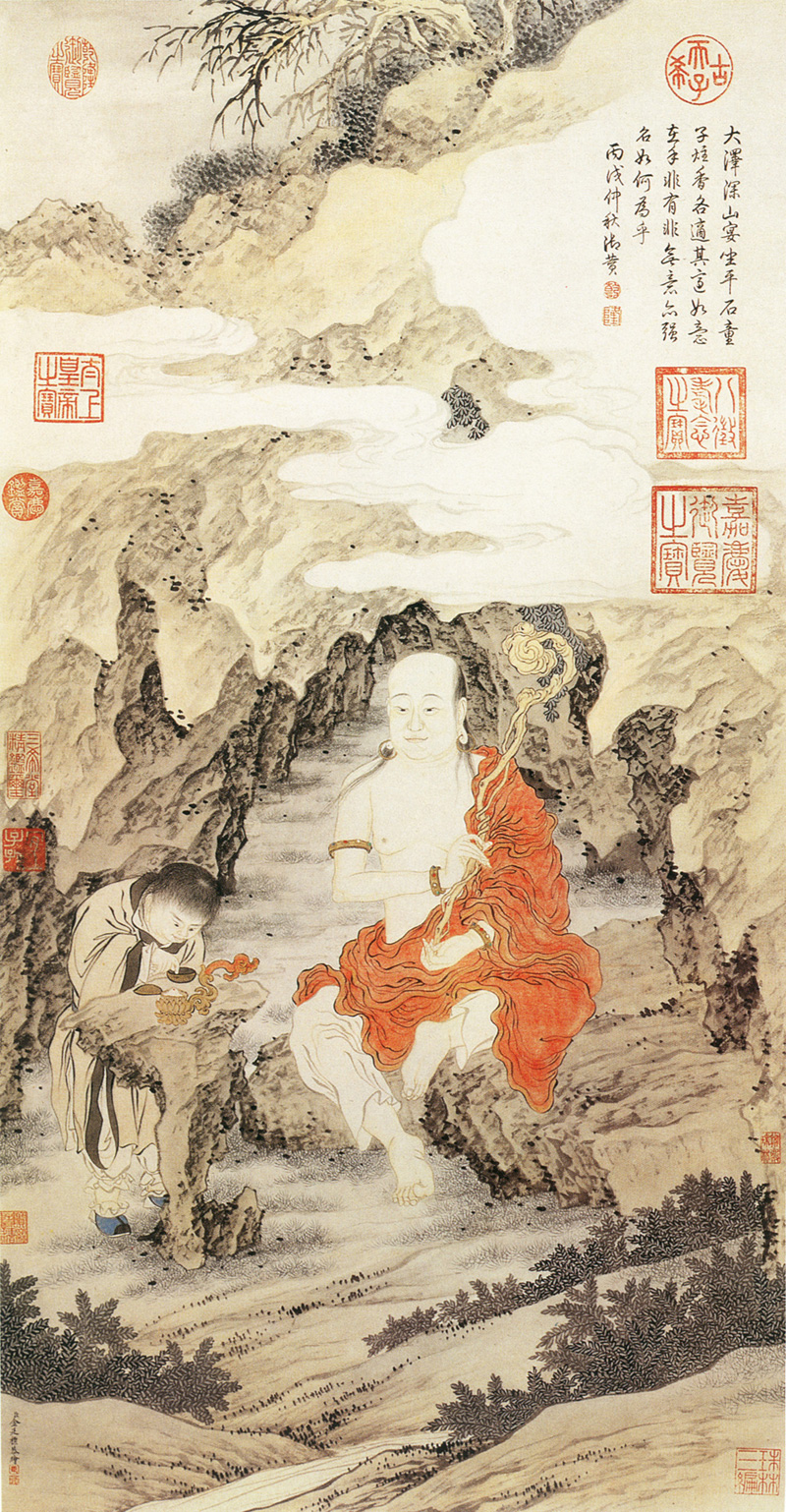
Buddhist Arhat (羅漢圖), Palace Museum, Beijing

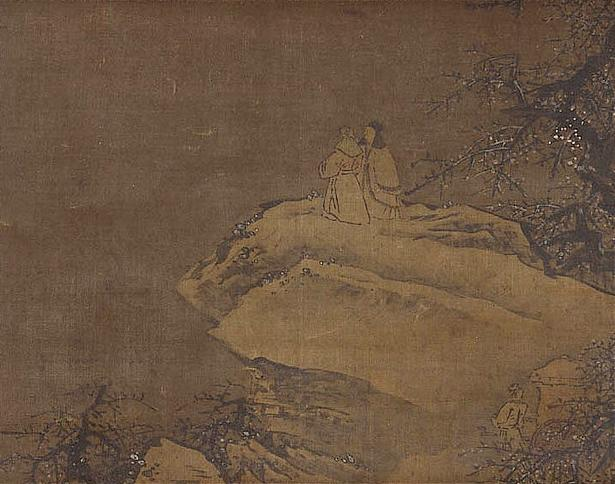
Enjoying the Beauty, National Museum in Warsaw
