= Wang Zhenpeng =

Wang Zhenpeng may refer to:

- Wang Zhenpeng (painter), Chinese landscape painter during the Yuan Dynasty (1271–1368)
- Wang Zhenpeng (footballer), Hong Kong footballer, current member of Kitchee SC
