= Zhang Yanyuan =

Chinese art historian (c. 815 – c. 877)

Zhang Yanyuan (simplified Chinese: 张彦远; traditional Chinese: 張彥遠; pinyin: Zhāng Yànyuǎn; Wade–Giles: Chang Yenyüan, c. 815- c. 877), courtesy name Aibin (爱宾), was a Chinese art historian, calligrapher, painter, and bureaucrat of the late Tang dynasty.

== Biography ==
Zhang was born to a high-ranking civil official family in present-day Yuncheng, Shanxi. He wrote several works about art and Chinese calligraphy, among them Fashu Yaolu (法書要錄, "Compendium of Calligraphy"), a collection of poems on color paper, and Lidai Minghua Ji (歷代名畫記, "Famous Paintings through History"), a general arts book about famous historical paintings. Zhang created his own style of art history writing, combining historical facts and art criticism. His book also described the painter's lives thoroughly, including biography and works.

Zhang's art theory consists of several distinctive features. He agreed with the theory of Xie He that art had moral and political functions; he stressed the importance of originality and creativity in painting, opposing to stereotyped painting styles; and he was adamant that the painter's background had a great influence on the painting.
