= Li Rongjin =

Chinese landscape painter

Li Rongjin (Li Jung-chin, traditional: 李容瑾, simplified: 李容瑾); was a Chinese landscape painter during the Yuan Dynasty (1271–1368). His specific dates of birth and death are not known.

His style name was 'Gongyan'. Li's landscape painting style followed that of Wang Zhenpeng. In addition his paintings of garrets and attics were done with delicate and precise brush strokes.
