= Leng Mei =

Chinese painter

Leng Mei (Chinese: 冷枚; pinyin: Lěng Méi; Wade–Giles: Leng Mei), was a Chinese painter. He was a native of Jiaozhou, Shandong province, active 1677-1742 (his specific years of birth and death are not known). His courtesy name was Jichen (吉臣), and sobriquet Jinmen Waishi, or Jinmen Shushi. He was Jiao Bingzhen's student. Leng's specialty was painting human figures, particularly court ladies.

== Works ==
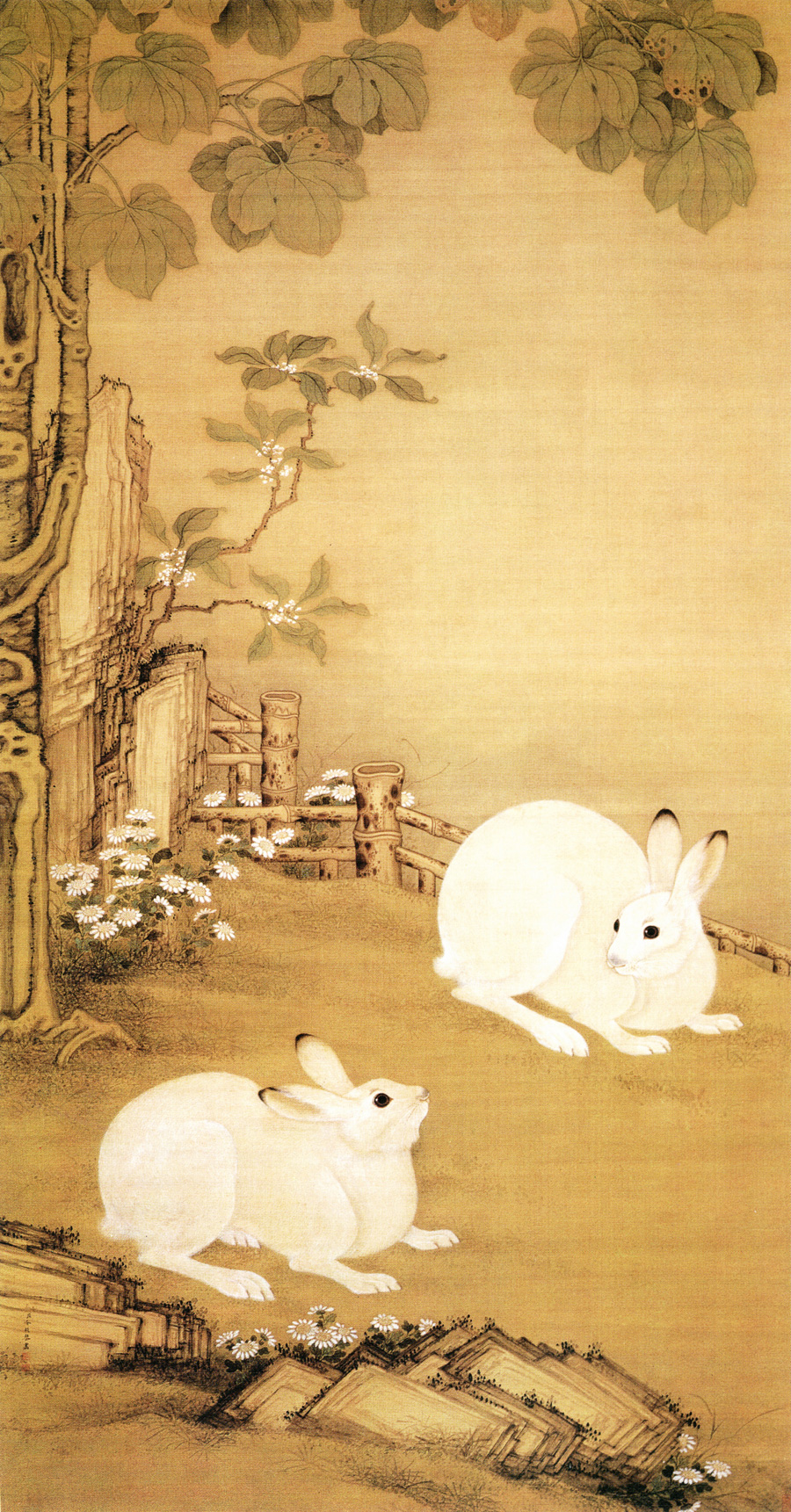
Two Rabbits under Chinese Parasol Tree (梧桐双兔图), Leng Mei, Palace Museum, Beijing

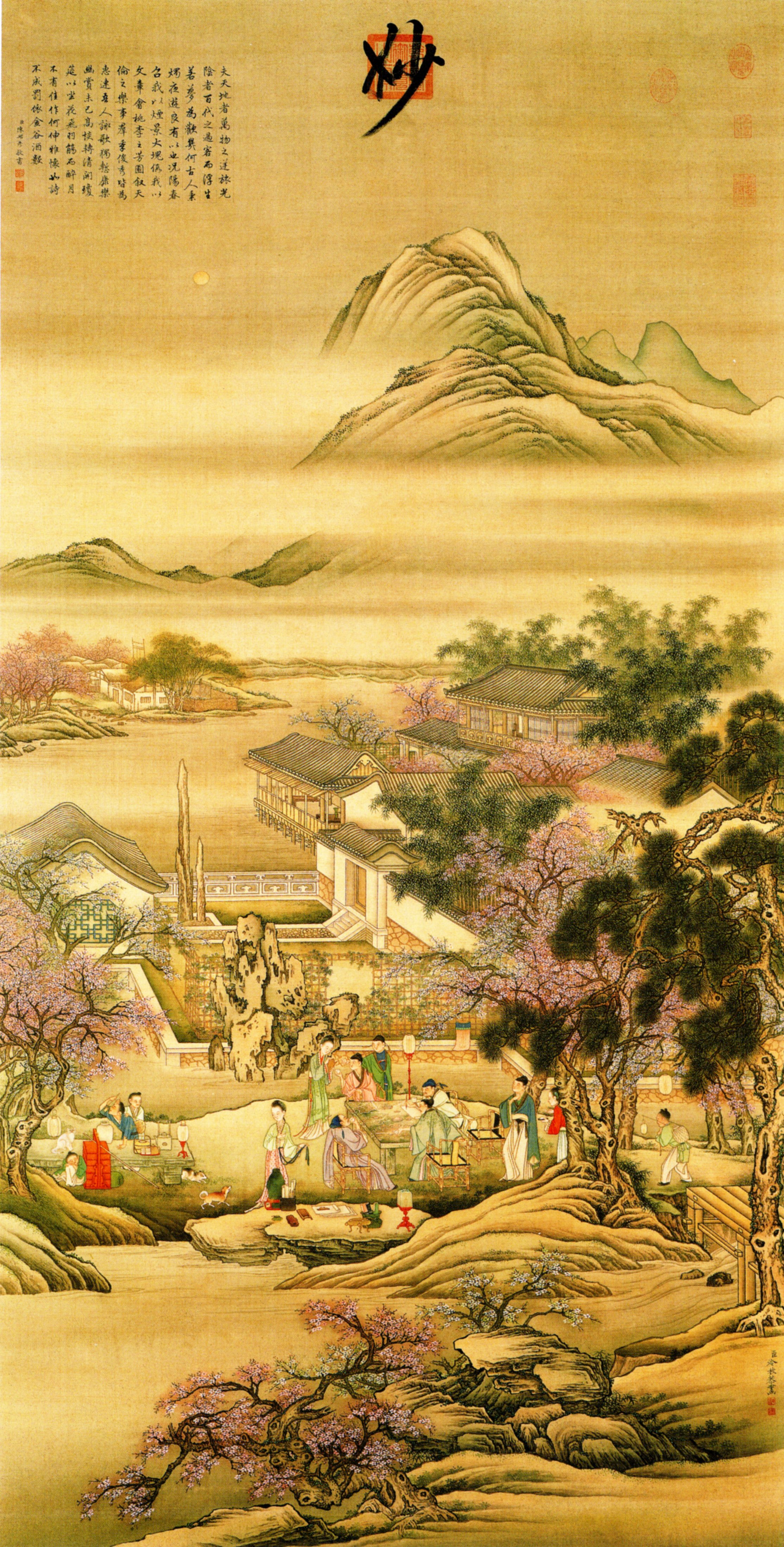
Spring Evening Banquet at the Peach and Pear Blossom Garden (春夜宴桃李園), Leng Mei, National Palace Museum, Taipei

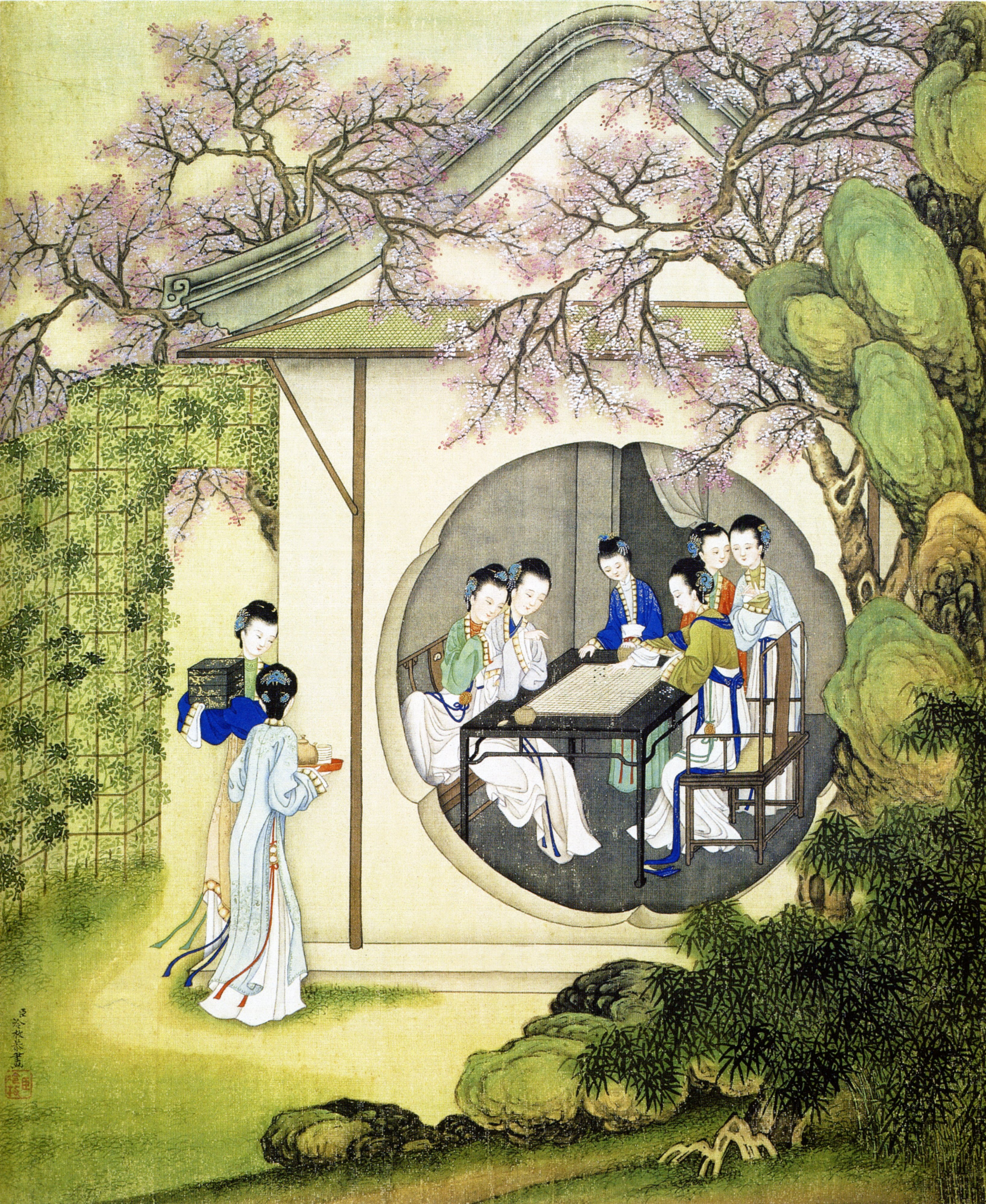
Figures (人物), Leng Mei, National Palace Museum, Taipei
