= Along the River During the Qingming Festival =

Painting attributed to Zhang Zeduan

- 清明上河圖
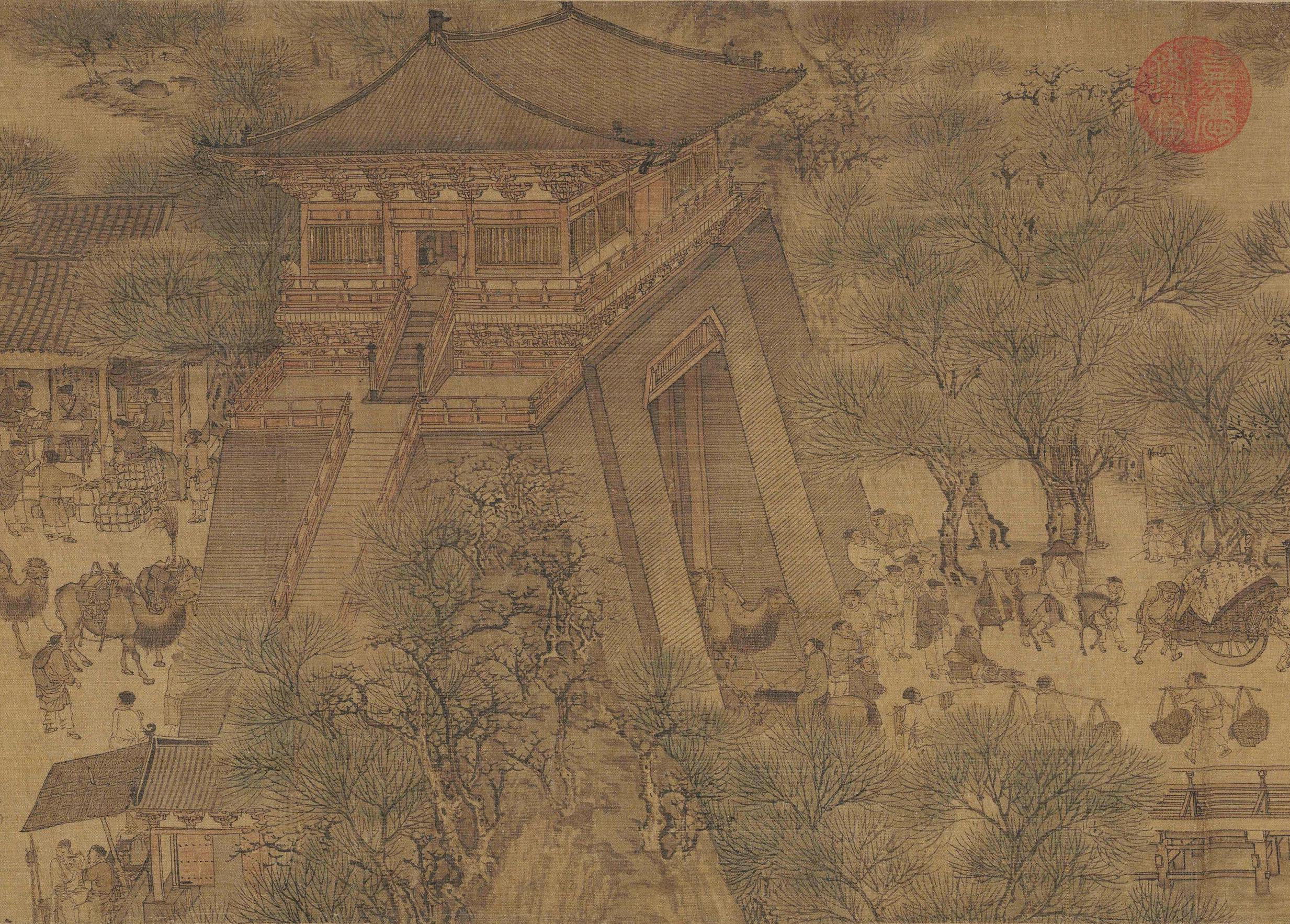
- A small section of the painting depicting scenes at the Bianjing city gate
- Artist: Zhang Zeduan
- Year: 1085–1145
- Type: Ink and color on silk; handscroll
- Dimensions: 25.5 cm × 525 cm (10.0 in × 207 in)
- Location: Palace Museum, Beijing

Along the River During the Qingming Festival
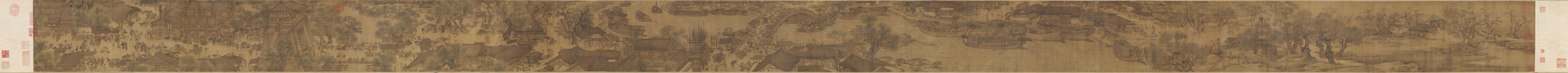
- Traditional Chinese: 清明上河圖
- Simplified Chinese: 清明上河图
Transcriptions
Standard Mandarin
- Hanyu Pinyin: Qīngmíng Shànghé Tú
- Bopomofo: ㄑㄧㄥ ㄇㄧㄥˊ ㄕㄤˋ ㄏㄜˊ ㄊㄨˊ
- Wade–Giles: Ch‘ing^{1}-ming^{2} Shang^{4}-ho^{2} T‘u^{2}
- IPA: [tɕʰíŋ.mǐŋ.ʂâŋ.xɤ̌.tʰǔ]
Yue: Cantonese
- Yale Romanization: Chīngmìhng Seuhnghòh Tòuh
- Jyutping: cing1 ming4 soeng6 ho4 tou4
- IPA: [tsʰɪŋ˥.mɪŋ˩.sœŋ˨.hɔ˩.tʰɔw˩]

Along the River During the Qingming Festival (simplified Chinese: 清明上河图; traditional Chinese: 清明上河圖; pinyin: Qīngmíng Shànghé Tú; lit. 'Clear bright up river image') is a handscroll painting by the Song dynasty painter Zhang Zeduan (1085–1145) and copied or recreated many times in the following centuries. It captures the daily life of people and the landscape of the capital, Bianjing (present-day Kaifeng) during the Northern Song. The theme is often said to be the spirit and worldly commotion at the Qingming Festival, rather than the holiday's ceremonial aspects, such as tomb sweeping and prayers. Read right to left, as a viewer would unroll it, successive scenes reveal the lifestyle of all levels of the society from rich to poor as well as economic activities in both rural areas and the city, and offer glimpses of clothing and architecture. The painting is considered the most renowned work among all Chinese paintings, and it has been called "China's Mona Lisa."

As an artistic creation, the painting has been revered and artists of subsequent dynasties made hundreds of replicas, copies of copies, and even forgeries of well-regarded copies, each following the overall composition and the theme of the original but differing in detail and technique. Over the centuries, the Song original was kept in private collections before it eventually returned to public ownership. The painting was a particular favorite of Puyi, the last emperor of China, who took it with him when he was forced to leave the Forbidden City in 1924. It was recovered in 1945 and kept at the Palace Museum in the Forbidden City. The Song original and later versions are regarded as national treasures and are exhibited intermittently, and only for brief periods of time, due to their delicate nature.

== The Song original ==
The original painting is celebrated as the most famed work of art from the Song dynasty. However, little was directly known about its painter, who is generally presumed to be Zhang Zeduan, since many written records were destroyed when the Jin dynasty overthrew the Northern Song dynasty in 1127. There is continued debate and research over its creator, the date and location of where it was painted, and the intended meaning of the work. The earliest attribution to Zhang Zeduan is an inscription dated 1186, which was added on the basis of an earlier catalogue by the Jin imperial curator, Zhang Zhu (active late 12th century) to the original scroll:

Hanlin [Academician] Zhang Zeduan, courtesy name Zhengdao, was a native of Dongwu. He went to the capital to study when he was young. Later he learned painting. He mastered jiehua and took particular pleasure in depicting boats, carts, markets, bridges, city walls, and streets. He even established his own style. According to Mr. Xiang's critiques on paintings, [the works] Xihu zhengbiao tu (Dragon Boat Regatta on the West Lake) and Qingming shanghe tu belong to the divine class; collectors should treasure them.

The scroll is 25.5 centimetres (10.0 inches) in height and 5.25 meters (5.74 yards) long. In its length there are 814 humans, 28 boats, 60 animals, 30 buildings, 20 vehicles, 8 sedan chairs, and 170 trees. Only about twenty women appear in the Song dynasty original, and only women of low social rank are visible out of doors unless accompanied by men.

The bridge scene

The countryside and the densely populated city are the two main sections in the picture, with the river meandering through the entire length. The right section is the rural area of the city. There are crop fields and unhurried rural folk—predominately farmers, goatherds, and pig herders—in bucolic scenery. A country path broadens into a road and joins with the city road. The left half is the urban area, which eventually leads into the city proper with the gates. Many economic activities, such as people loading cargoes onto the boat, shops, and even a tax office, can be seen in this area. People from all walks of life are depicted: peddlers, jugglers, actors, paupers begging, monks asking for alms, fortune tellers and seers, doctors, innkeepers, teachers, millers, metalworkers, carpenters, masons, and official scholars from all ranks.

Outside the city proper (separated by the gate to the left), there are businesses of all kinds, selling wine, grain, secondhand goods, cookware, bows and arrows, lanterns, musical instruments, gold and silver, ornaments, dyed fabrics, paintings, medicine, needles, and artifacts, as well as many restaurants. The vendors (and in the Qing revision, the shops themselves) extend all along the great bridge, called the Rainbow Bridge (虹橋 Hong Qiao) or, more rarely, the Shangdu Bridge (上土橋).

Where the great bridge crosses the river is the center and main focus of the scroll. A great commotion animates the people on the bridge. A boat approaches at an awkward angle with its tow-mast not completely lowered, threatening to crash into the bridge. The crowds on the bridge and along the riverside are shouting and gesturing toward the boat. Someone near the apex of the bridge lowers a rope to the outstretched arms of the crew below. In addition to the shops and diners, there are inns, temples, private residences, and official buildings varying in grandeur and style, from huts to mansions with grand front- and backyards.

People and commodities are transported by various modes: wheeled wagons, beasts of labor (in particular, a large number of donkeys and mules), sedan chairs, and chariots. The river is packed with fishing boats and passenger-carrying ferries, with men at the river bank, pulling the larger ships.

Many of these details are roughly corroborated by Song dynasty writings, principally the Dongjing Meng Hua Lu, which describes many of the same features of life in the capital.

== Copies ==
The original painting was a pride of the imperial collections for centuries. It was frequently copied by later artists of successive periods and it became familiarized among the nobles, scholar officials, urban residents and merchants. Many scholars thought of the Song original as the "masterpiece", and gave little respect to later versions, which they called mere copies, forgeries, reproductions, reinterpretations or elaborations, more than a hundred of which are now in museums in China, Japan, Korea, Taiwan, the United Kingdom, North America, and France. The significance and value of these "copies", however, has recently been recognized.

An early copy, generally considered to be faithful to the original, was made by Zhao Mengfu during the Yuan dynasty.

The Ming dynasty (14th to 17th centuries) painter Qiu Ying is credited with several copies, which have considerable differences from the original. One version came to the Metropolitan Museum of Art in New York in 1947. Another has a length of 6.7 meters, longer than the original. It also replaced the scenery from the Song dynasty to that of the Ming dynasty based on contemporary fashions and customs, updating the costumes worn by the characters and the styles of vehicles (boats and carts). The Song wooden bridge is replaced with a stone bridge in the Ming remake. The arc of the stone bridge is much taller than that of the wooden original, and where the original had a boat about to crash into the bridge, the reinterpretation has a boat being methodically guided under the bridge by ropes, pulled by men ashore, several other large boats dutifully waiting their turn, undisturbed. Another 12 meter long copy from the late Ming period is kept in the Museum of Applied Arts, Vienna in Austria.

In the late Ming and early Qing dynasties, dozens of copies were made by little-known professional painters in Suzhou, usually carrying the (forged) signature of either Zhang Zeduan or Qiu Ying. The scholar Chang Su-chen argues that these paintings should not be dismissed as mere "copies." These painters, she says, created “distinctive paintings that visualized pre-modern viewers’ various conceptions of a “great age,” an ideal society from the traditional Chinese perspective.”

Quite different was the painting, known as the "Qing Court Version", commissioned by the Yongzheng Emperor, which was completed only after his death by five court painters (Chen Mu, Sun Hu, Jin Kun, Dai Hong and Cheng Zhidao). These five artists worked from a draft scroll in ink, also shown below, by Shen Yuan, another court painter, who apparently worked under the emperor's personal supervision. It was presented to the Qianlong Emperor on January 15, 1737. This is distinguished by its innovative modern style, high degree of detail, and intact preservation. This version, shown below, was later moved, along with major portions of the imperial collection, to the National Palace Museum in Taipei in 1949. There are many more people, over 4,000, in this remake, which also is much larger (at 11 metres by 35 cm, or 37 ft by 1 ft). The leftmost third of this version, which does not appear in the Song version, is within the palace, with buildings and people appearing refined and elegant. Most people within the castle are women, with some well-dressed officials.

=== Associated poem ===
In April 1742, the Qianlong Emperor composed a poem to be added to the right-most end of the 1737 scroll. The calligraphy is in the running script style, and is in the hand of Liang Shizheng (梁詩正), a prominent court official and companion of the emperor. The poem reads as follows:

Original

蜀錦裝金壁
吳工聚碎金
謳歌萬井富
城闕九重深
盛事誠觀止
遺踪借探尋
當時誇豫大
此日歎徽欽

Pinyin

Shǔjǐn zhuāng jīn bì
Wú gōng jù suìjīn
ōugē wànjǐng fù
chéngquè jiǔchóng shēn
shèngshì chéng guānzhǐ
yízōng jiè tànxún
dāngshí kuā Yù dà
cǐrì tàn Huī Qīn.

Literal translation

A wall of gold has been mounted on Shu brocade.
Craftsmen from Wu collect spare change
The watchtowers of the city rise to great heights.
To pay tribute to the abundance of a myriad of families.
The bustling scene is truly impressive.
It is a chance to explore vestiges of bygone days.
At that time, people marveled at the size of Yu,
And now, we lament the fates of Hui and Qin.

== Notable exhibitions ==
In a rare move, the Song original was exhibited in Hong Kong from June 29 to mid-August 2007 to commemorate the 10th anniversary of Hong Kong's transfer to the People's Republic of China. It is estimated that the costs of shipping the painting ran into tens of millions of dollars in addition to an undisclosed cost of insuring this piece of priceless art.

From January 2–24, 2012, the painting was exhibited in the Tokyo National Museum as the centerpiece of a special exhibition to mark the 40th anniversary of normalized diplomatic relations between China and Japan, with the Japanese museum officials providing the "highest security standards" for the work as this was the first attested time ever in the almost nine centuries since the painting's creation that it had left China.

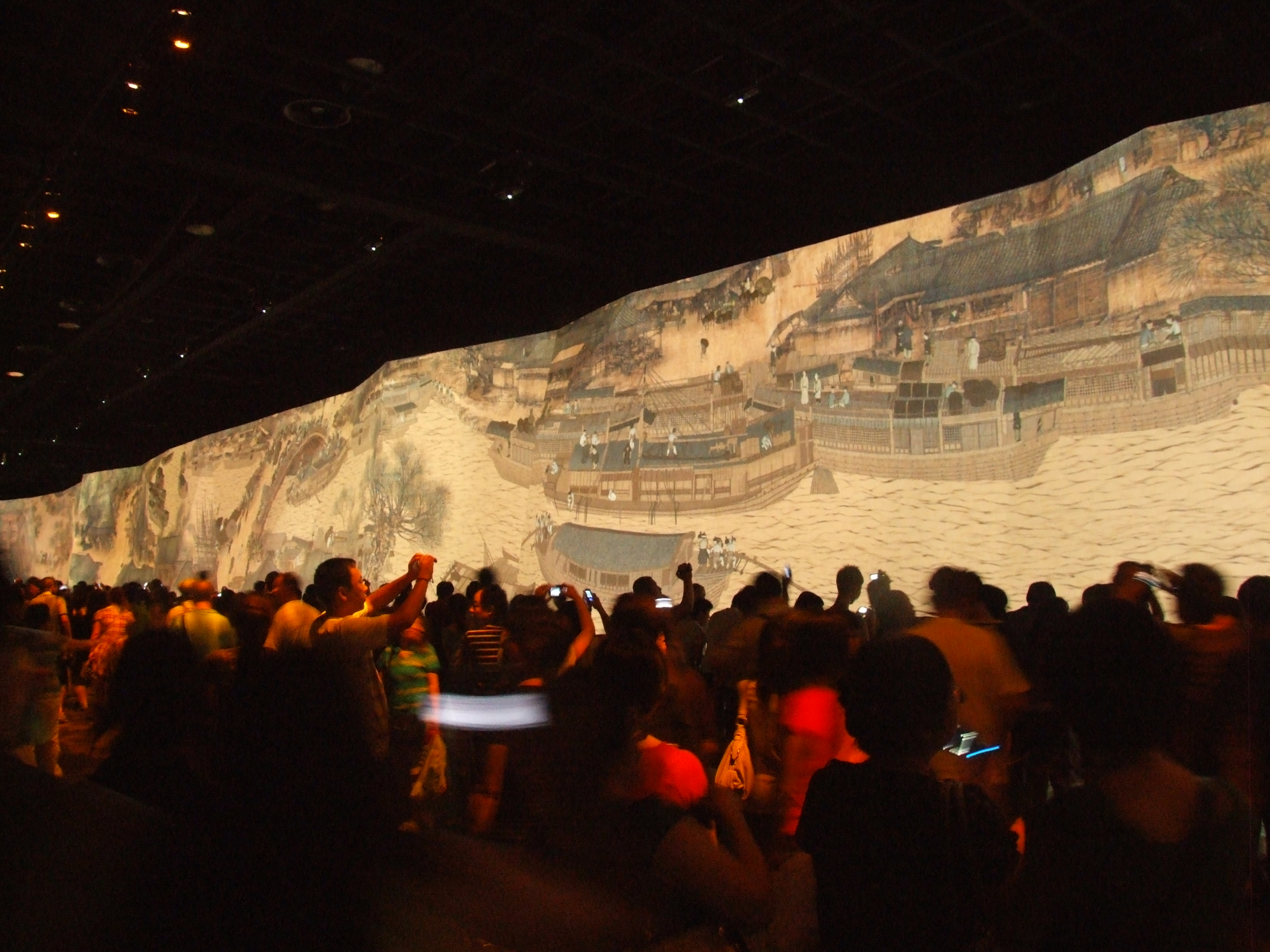
The digital River of Wisdom, on display at the World Expo 2010.

The renown of the painting has notably led to queues of several hours long during the rare occasions of its display in public exhibitions.

=== Digital version ===
For a three-month period in the World Expo 2010 presented at the China Pavilion, the original painting was remade into a 3D animated, viewer-interactive digital version, titled River of Wisdom; at 128 × 6.5 m, it is roughly 30 times the size of the original scroll. The computer-animated mural, with moving characters and objects and portraying the scene in 4-minute day and night cycles, was one of the primary exhibitions in the Chinese Pavilion, drawing queues up to two hours with a reservation. Elaborate computer animation gives life to the painting.

After the Expo, the digital version was on display at the AsiaWorld–Expo in Hong Kong from November 9 to 29, 2010, where it was a major commercial success. It was then exhibited at the Macau Dome in Macau from March 25 to April 14, 2011. The digital painting also traveled to Taiwan and displayed at the Expo Dome in Taipei from July 1 to September 4, 2011. From December 7, 2011, to February 6, 2012, in an exhibition titled A Moving Masterpiece: The Song Dynasty As Living Art, the digital reproduction was exhibited at the Singapore Expo. Today, it is on permanent exhibition at the China Art Museum, Shanghai.

== Gallery ==
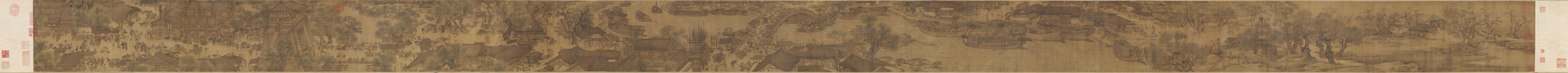
Along the River During the Qingming Festival (清明上河圖), the 12th-century original by Zhang Zeduan
The "Suzhou Imitation" of Along the River During the Qingming Festival (蘇州片清明上河圖), a remake by a Suzhou workshop artist of the Ming dynasty
Qingming in Ease and Simplicity (清明易簡圖), a remake by an unknown artist of the Ming dynasty
Along the River During the Qingming Festival, Shen Yuan's 18th-century draft scroll remake in ink
The "Qing Court Version" of Along the River During the Qingming Festival (清院本清明上河圖), an 18th-century remake by the collaborative effort of the Qing court artists Chen Mei, Sun Hu, Jin Kun, Dai Hong, and Cheng Zhidao

== Analysis and questions ==
Scholars have studied the painting carefully in the second half of the twentieth and beginning of the twenty-first century but do not agree on many basic points. Scholars question the accuracy of the translation of the painting's name, since the word Qingming may refer to either "peace and order" or to the Qingming Festival. Other translations have been suggested:

- Along the river during Qingming Festival
- Going Upriver on the Qingming Festival
- Life along the Bian River at the Qingming Festival
- Life Along the Bian River at the Pure Brightness Festival
- Riverside Scene at Qingming Festival
- Upper River during Qing Ming Festival
- Spring Festival on the River
- Spring Festival Along the River
- Peace Reigns Over the River

During the late 1960s, the Taipei Palace Museum released a series of books (later digitized as CD-ROM), videos, and stamps about the scroll that translated it loosely as A City of Cathay.

Some scholars now question three things that had long been accepted about the Song dynasty original: that the city depicted is Kaifeng; that it was painted before the fall of the Northern Song dynasty in 1127, and that it depicts the Qingming Festival. Some suggest that the city is an idealized city of the mind; that it was painted after the fall of the dynasty in 1127; and that it depicts a scene in early autumn. However, other scholars view that the city is indeed Kaifeng, but that the painting depicts a day in the Qingming solar term of the Chinese calendar, not the Qingming Festival.

An allegorical interpretation proposed that the painting was a subtle entreaty to the emperor that he recognize dangerous currents beneath the surface of prosperity. Kaifeng depended on grain from the far south, but the painting showed only a lowly official on duty at the docks, only a few guards stationed at the city gate and the docks, who did not appear to be alert. The term "Qingming" did not refer to either the holiday or the calendar but was taken from the phrase 清明之世 ("A bright and enlightened era") from the Book of the Later Han, and used ironically.

The wooden bridge depicted in the original version was reconstructed by a team of engineers and documented by the PBS television show NOVA during their Secrets of Lost Empires series.

== See also ==
- Chinese painting
- Culture of the Song dynasty
