= Secrets of Lost Empires =

PBS TV series

Secrets of Lost Empires is a two-part television series produced by PBS Nova, Boston (WGBH). Both series explore experimentally how ancient civilizations achieved notable constructions without modern machinery and construction methods. Each episode has guest experts who are challenged to develop and implement methods that may have been used. The original series was produced with the BBC and fully compiled in 1997 (although some episodes had been produced much earlier) and the second series was produced with Channel Four of the UK and fully compiled in 2000.

== Episodes ==
=== Series I (1997) ===
- Secrets of Lost Empires: This Old Pyramid (1992)
- Secrets of Lost Empires: Stonehenge
- Secrets of Lost Empires: Incas (1994)
- Secrets of Lost Empires: Obelisk
- Secrets of Lost Empires: Colosseum

=== Series II (2000) ===
- Secrets of Lost Empires II: Medieval Siege
- Secrets of Lost Empires II: Pharaoh's Obelisk (1999): re-examination of findings from first series
- Secrets of Lost Empires II: Easter Island (1998)
- Secrets of Lost Empires II: Roman Bath
- Secrets of Lost Empires II: China Bridge (1999): examination of the bridge in the renowned painting Along the River During the Qingming Festival
