= Famous Paintings through the Ages =

9th-century book on Chinese paintings

Famous Paintings through the Ages (simplified Chinese: 历代名画记; traditional Chinese: 歷代名畫記; pinyin: Lìdài Mínghuàjì) is a book on classical Chinese paintings written by Zhang Yanyuan of the Tang dynasty. It's considered the first comprehensive history of paintings in China. Many later historical and literary works such as Taiping Guangji, Taiping Yulan, and History of Painting (画史) by Mi Fu drew extensively from this book for painting related content during the Tang and earlier centuries.

== Creation and editions ==
Volume One of the book titled "The Rise and Fall of Painting" concludes with an inscription dated "the first year of the Dazhong era," corresponding to year 847. The author further noted that the book recorded "from the legendary figure Shihuang (also known as Cangjie, the chief minister of the Yellow Emperor, skilled in painting) to the first year of the Hui Chang era in the Tang dynasty, a total of 372 individuals were included. The sequence is meticulously arranged, and the evaluations are quite accurate. In addition, I have studied extensively various accounts of literature to elaborate on the process of my assessment, so that future scholars can continue their research based on this foundation I laid." Meanwhile, in Volume Three, "Murals at the West Capital Temple," a reference was made to "the seventh year of the Dazhong era" (853), indicating that the author was still actively working on the content after 847, with the final version being completed no earlier than 853.

According to Ming dynasty book collector, publisher Mao Jin's account, the Zhang family of Hedong (now Yongji, Shanxi Province) to which Zhang Yanyuan belonged, "collected distinguished calligraphy and paintings for three generations." Zhang's great grandfather and grandfather were both high ranking officials serving at the imperial courts, as well as avid collectors of calligraphy and paintings. The Zhang family collection once rivalled that of the royal family; and Empire Xianzong requested the Zhangs to surrender their collections to the court. Mao Jin believed that this family background and resources available served as the foundation for creating the book.

The book was initially circulated in manuscript form. During the reign of Emperor Lizong of the Southern Song dynasty (1224-1264), it was carved into woodblocks and printed in the capital city Lin'an, becoming a definitive edition. Most manuscripts and printed copies from the Ming and Qing dynasties were based on the Southern Song edition. The two surviving manuscripts housed in the National Library of China and the Kyushu University Library in Japan were believed to be copied during the Ming and Qing dynasties. Among all historical editions, Mao Jin's Jigu Ge edition is of the best quality and has the widest circulation.

== Legacy ==
The book consists of ten volumes, with the first three volumes serving as a general discussion on the study and theory of painting. The remaining seven volumes are biographies of painters written in chronological order, making it a comprehensive encyclopedia of painting history at the time. Before the creation of the book, Chinese art-related works mainly focused on appreciation and cataloging, such as Gu Kaizhi's (顾恺之) On Painting and Xie He's (谢赫) Classified Record of Ancient Paintings. Zhang Yanyuan thus pioneered Chinese art history by being the first to document painters in a chronological format.
