= Zhan Ziqian =

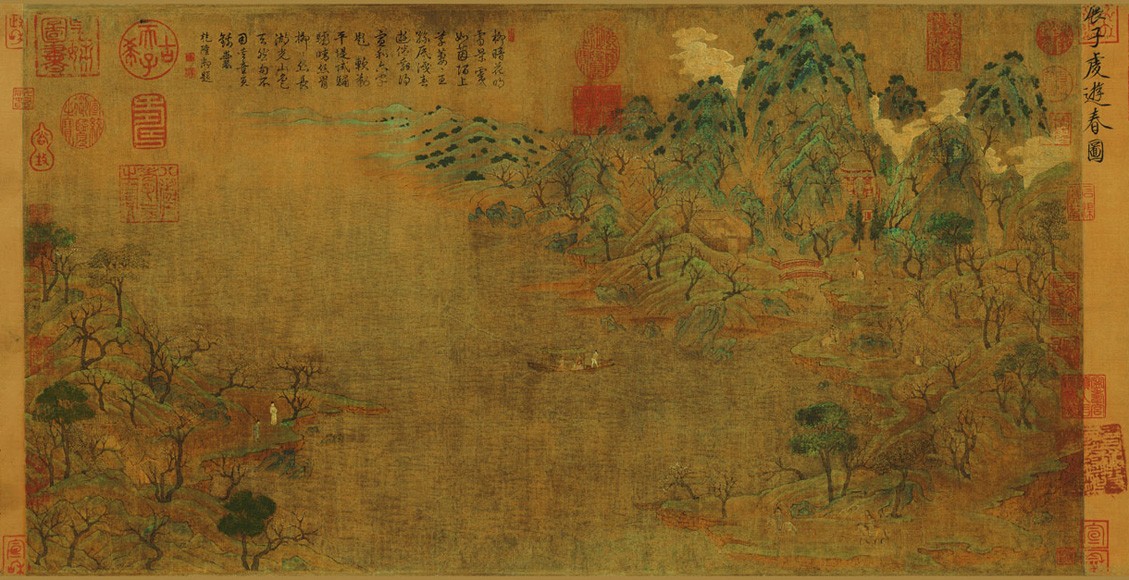
Zhan Ziqian, Stroll About in Spring (游春图). This may be a copy of the earlier Sui/Tang dynasty work.

Zhan Ziqian (Chinese: 展子虔; pinyin: Zhǎn Zǐqián; Wade–Giles: Chan Tzu-ch'ien; c. mid to late 6th century) was a famous painter of ancient China from Yangxin County in modern-day Shandong province. His birth and death dates are unknown. It is known that in the Sui dynasty (581–618) he was appointed to the office of Chaosan Dafu (朝散大夫) and later of Zhangnei Dudu (帐内都督).

According to the historical documents, Zhan Ziqian painted a number of genres and religion paintings which have not survived. He was especially noted for his paintings of pavilions and people, and horses. His paintings of people were particularly lifelike. The only painting by him that survives today is Strolling About in Spring, which is a perspective arrangement of mountains. It has been cited as the earliest surviving work of Chinese landscape painting or the first shan shui painting.
