= Yuan Jiang =

Chinese landscape painter

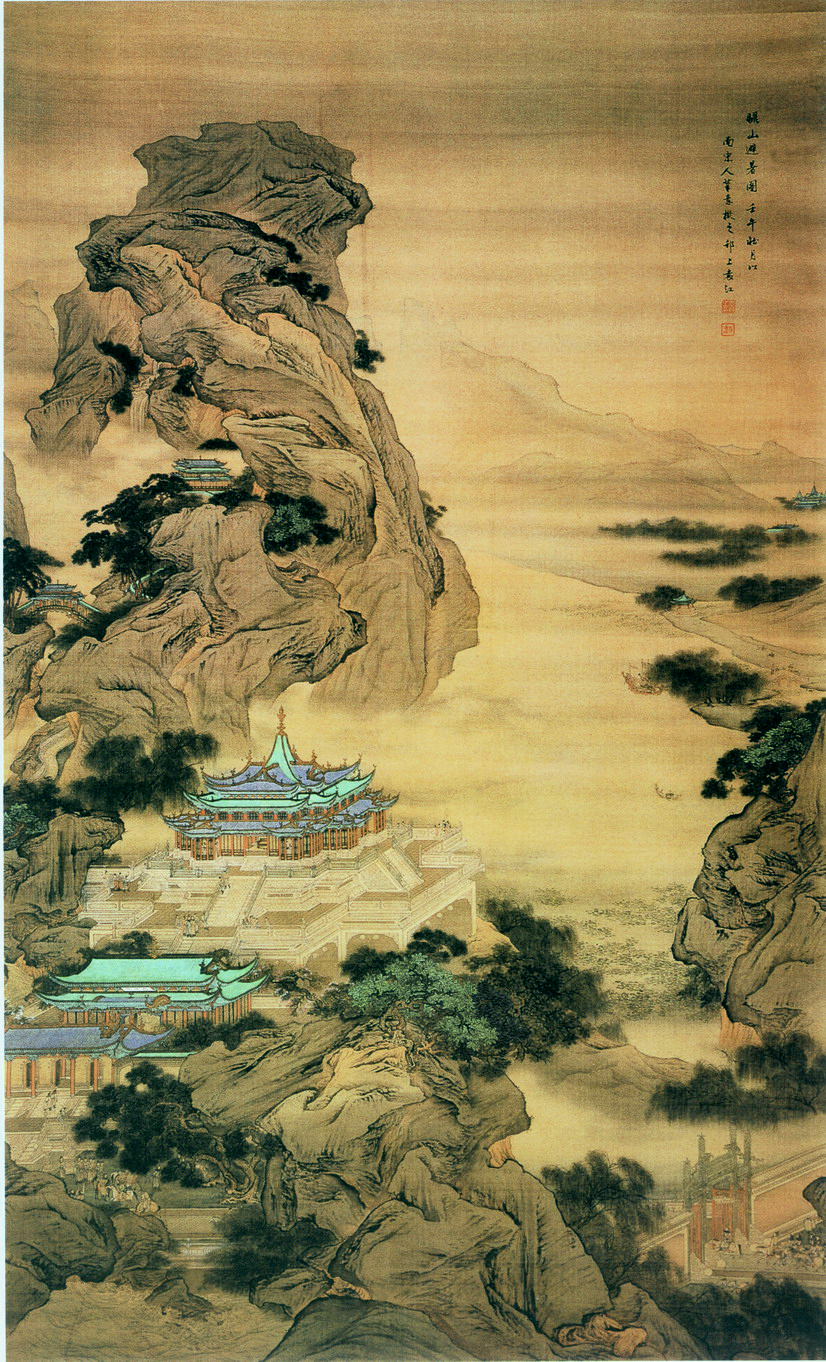
Mount Li Escaping the Heat (驪山避暑图 ), Capital Museum Beijing

Yuan Jiang (Chinese: 袁江; pinyin: Yuán Jiāng; Wade–Giles: Yüan Chiang, c. 1671–c. 1746); was a Chinese landscape painter who lived in the Qing dynasty (1644–1912). He served at the imperial palace during the Yongzheng era (1722–1735).

Yuan was born in Yangzhou in coastal Jiangsu province. He was part of an artistic family; his nephew Yuan Yao was also a landscape painter. Yuan painted landscapes and garrets, as well as bird-and-flower paintings and paintings of beasts. His landscapes and garrets contained accurate compositions and minute details that were suitable for construction.
