= Yuan Yao =

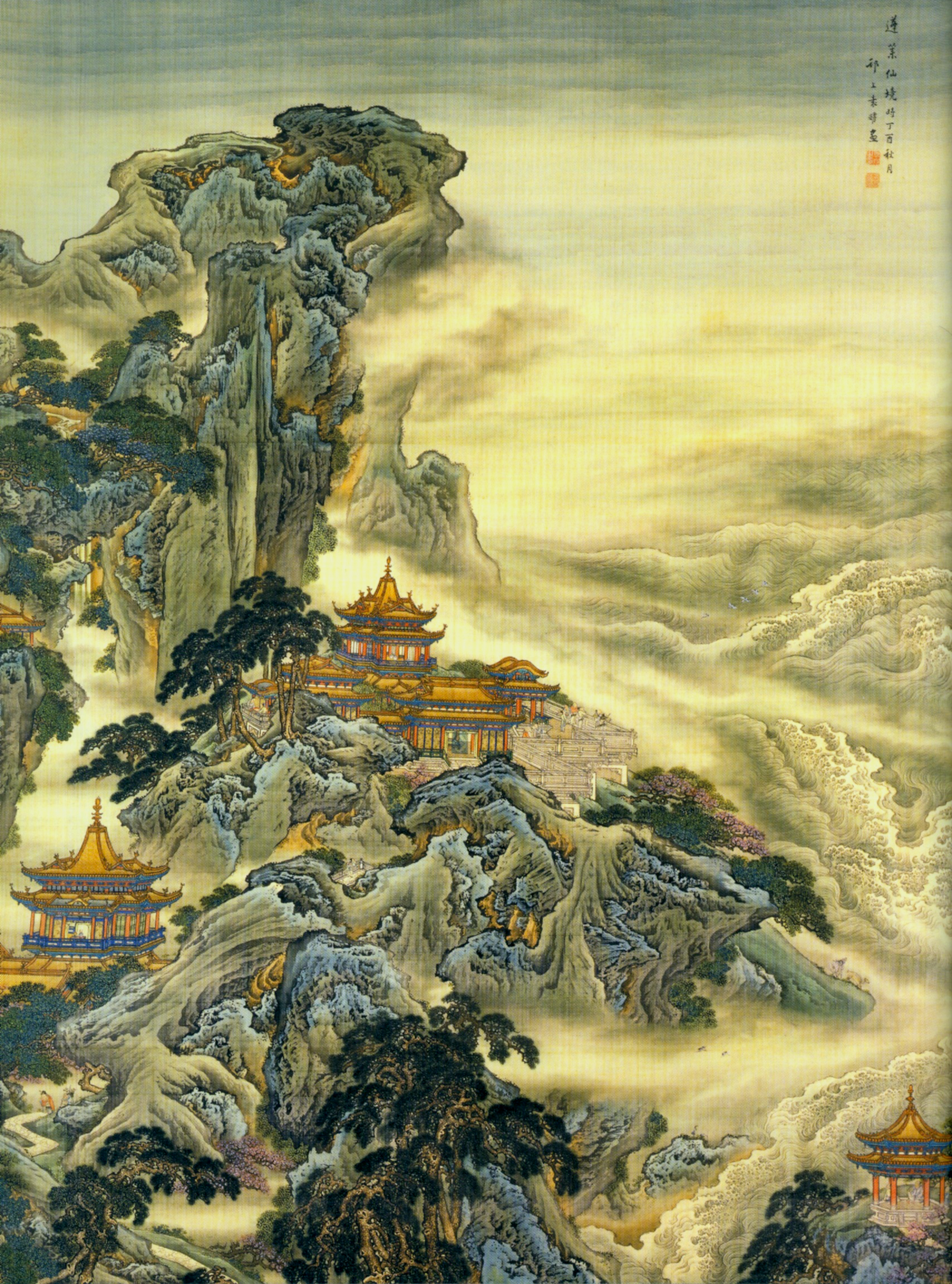
Penglai, one of the mythical islands. Hanging scroll by Yuan Yao

Yuan Yao (Yüan Yao, traditional: 袁耀, simplified: 袁耀); was a Chinese landscape painter during the Qing Dynasty (1644–1912). Yuan was born in Yangzhou in the Jiangsu province. His courtesy name was Zhaodao, and he took the art name Niyuzhe. His specific years of birth and death are unknown.

Yuan primarily painted landscapes and was a student of his uncle Yuan Jiang. Yuan was, along with Yuan Jiang, Li Yin, Yan Yi, and Wang Yun, a notable practitioner of “boundary painting” (jiehua) techniques, associated with realist gongbi practices. These painters were all based in Yangzhou.
