= Jiao Bingzhen =

Chinese painter and astronomer

Jiao Bingzhen (simplified Chinese: 焦秉贞; traditional Chinese: 焦秉貞; pinyin: Jiāo Bǐngzhēn; Wade–Giles: Chiao Ping-chen, active 1689–1726) was a native of Jining, Shandong who became a noted painter and astronomer. He is one of the first Qing dynasty painters to blend traditional Chinese painting with western culture. He is also among the more significant portrait and miniature painters in the early Qing. He was skilled in painting people, landscapes, and buildings.

The Western influence in his art came from his exposure to the Jesuits at the Directorate of Astronomy. Their influence also exposed him to new ideas on astronomy and religion. At some point Jiao became a Roman Catholic and played a role on the Jesuit side of the Chinese Rites controversy.

== Paintings ==
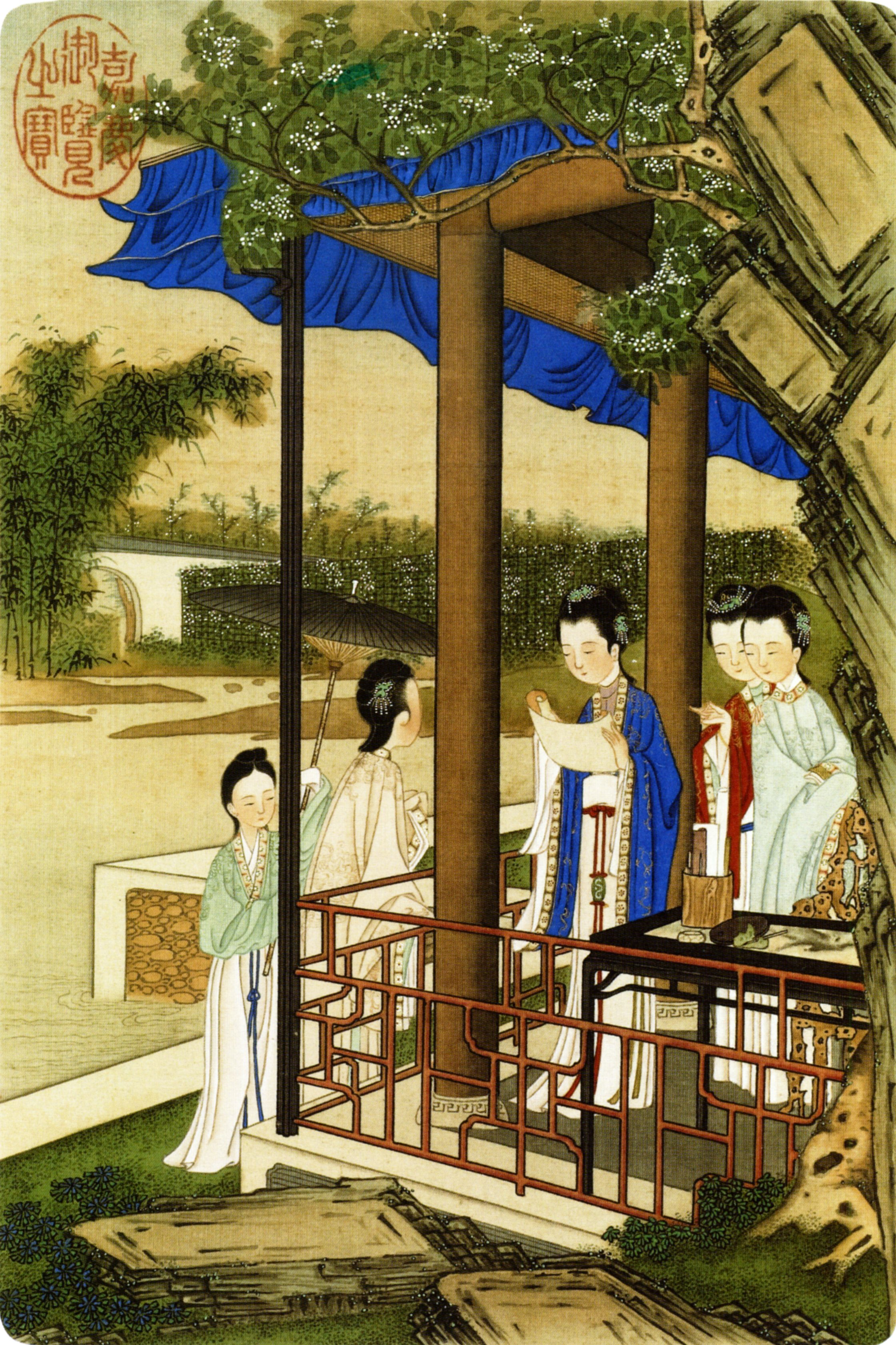
Paintings of Ladies - Leaf #2 (畫仕女圖). Ink and color on silk. Width 20.4 cm, Height 30.9 cm. National Palace Museum

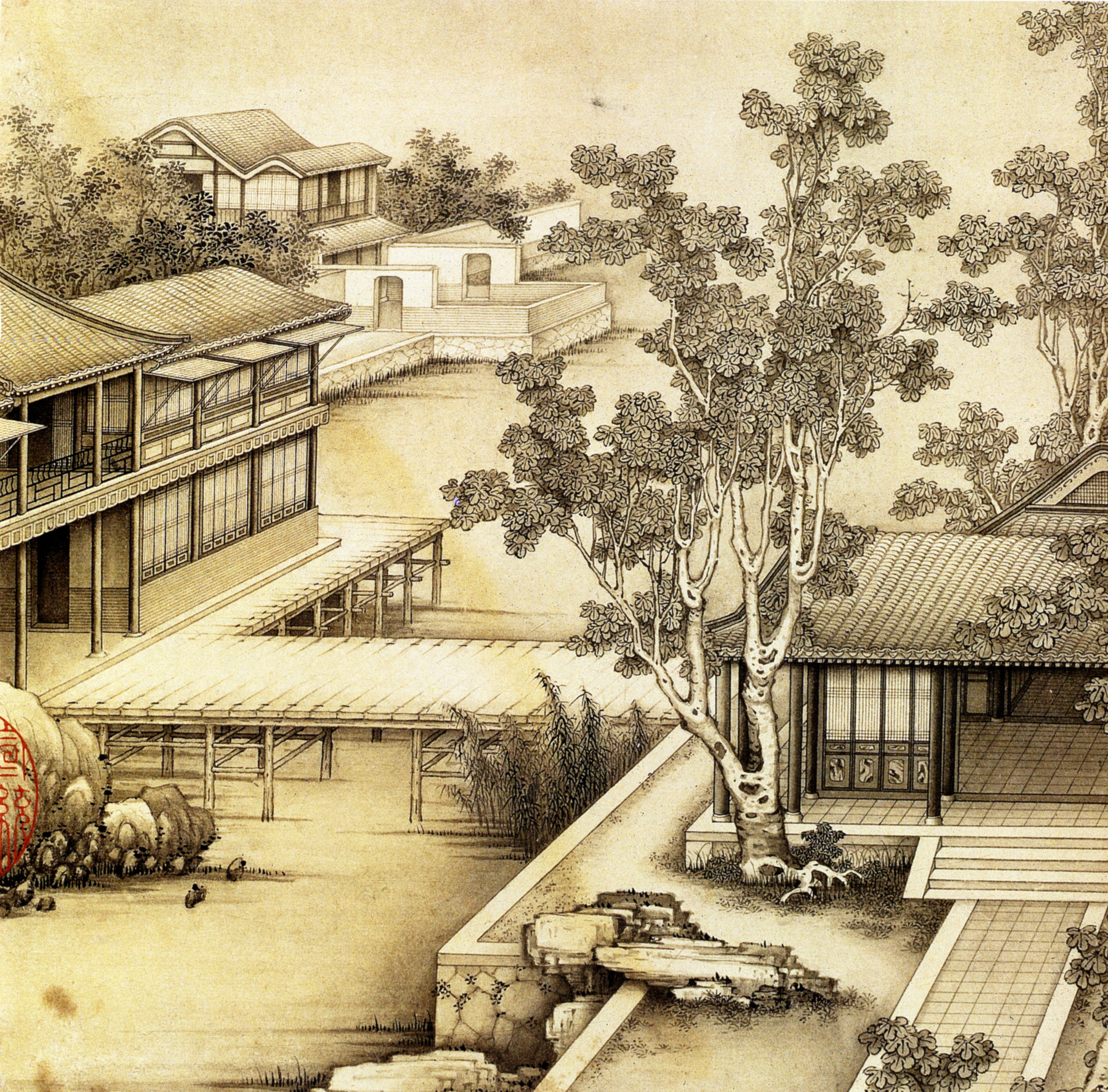
Landscapes - Leaf #2 (山水). Ink on paper. Width 26.4 cm, Height 26.2 cm. National Palace Museum
