= Wang Zhenpeng (painter) =

Chinese landscape painter

Wang Zhenpeng (simplified Chinese: 王振鹏; traditional Chinese: 王振鵬; pinyin: Wáng Zhènpéng; Wade–Giles: Wang Chên-p'êng); was a Chinese landscape painter who worked in the imperial court during the Yuan Dynasty (1271–1368). His specific dates of birth and death are not known, though he was active 1280–1329.

Wang was born in Yongjia in the Zhejiang province. His style name was 'Pengmei' (朋梅) and his pseudonym was 'Guyun chushi' (孤雲處士). Wang's painting of landscapes and follow in the style of Li Gongling in their ease and grace of appearance. His architecture drawings were mostly uncolored, in a fineline style known as 'jiehua' (界畫).

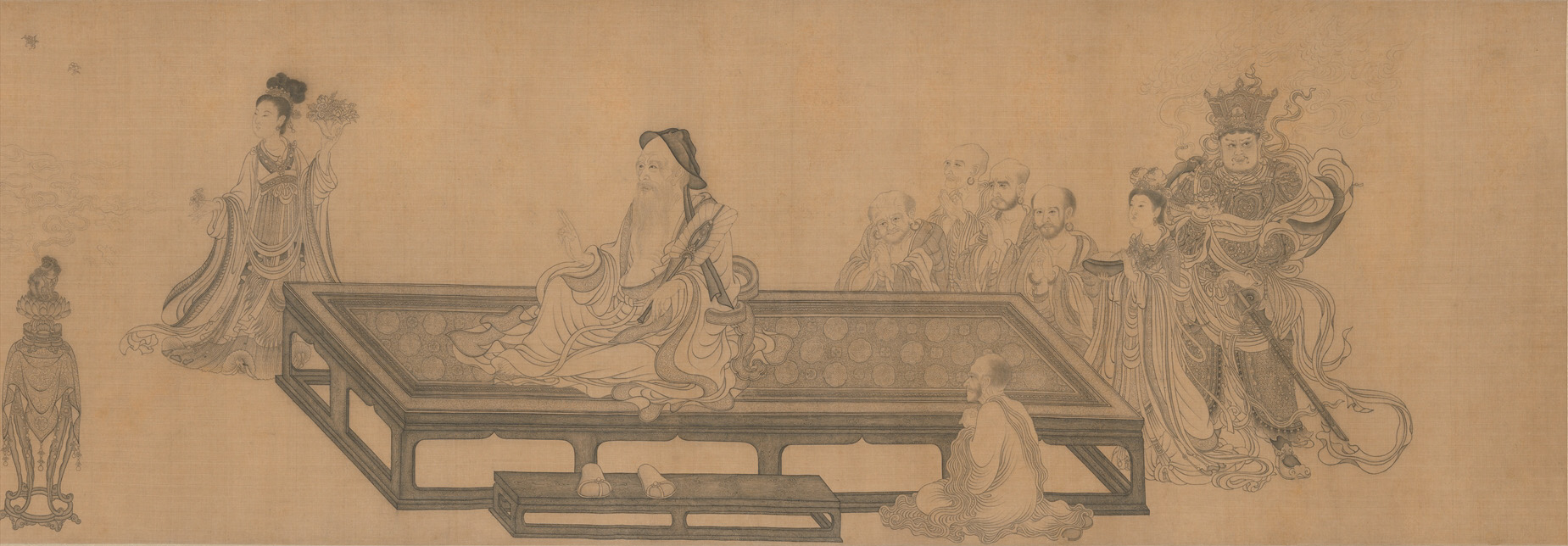
Vimalakirti and the Doctrine of Nonduality (1308), handscroll, ink on silk, Metropolitan Museum of Art.
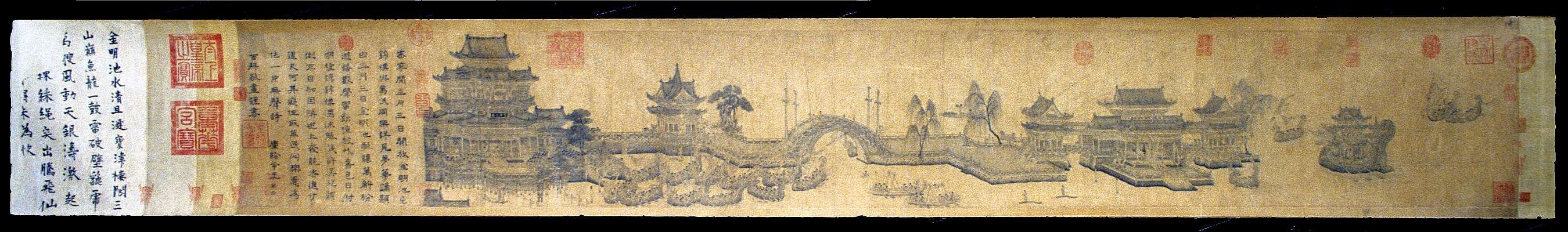
Dragon Boat Regatta (1310/1325), ink on silk, Detroit Institute of Arts.
