= Shen Quan =

Shen Quan (simplified Chinese: 沈铨; traditional Chinese: 沈銓; pinyin: Shěn Quán; Wade–Giles: Shen Ch'üan; c. 1682–1760) was a Chinese painter during the Qing dynasty (1644–1912). His courtesy name was Nanpin (南蘋) and his sobriquet was Hengzhai (衡斎). His works became influential in Japanese Edo period art.

== Biography ==
Shen was born in Deqing in Zhejiang province. He specialized in bird-and-flower painting, and was influenced by Bian Jingzhao and Lü Ji. His works were painted in a very realistic style, and he had many students and patrons.

Shen was invited to Japan by a high official. He arrived in Nagasaki in the final month of 1731 with two students, acquiring many Japanese students after his arrival. His paintings soon became very popular, and after his 1733 return to China he continued to send paintings back to Japan. Shen had many pupils while in Japan; his most important was Kumashiro Yūhi, who in turn taught Sō Shiseki and Kakutei. Other artists influenced by Shen included Katsushika Hokusai, Maruyama Ōkyo, and Ganku.

Shen's paintings were popular for their realistic, colored images of animals and flowers, and three-dimensional trees and rocks.

== Critical analysis ==
The painting style of Shen Nanping and his school would therefore be fruit of an artistic investigation. In their paintings, flora and fauna are not just “realistic”, but are styled just as they appear in Chinese and European treatises. Chinese and Western treatises on natural sciences could have played a key role in the spread of knowledge on subjects such as botany, zoology, and mineralogy, and that the images featured in these treatises might have inspired artists to choose and create new representations of bird-and-flower. That is why scholar Meccarelli has called the style of the Shen Nanping school “flora and fauna decorative painting”.

== Gallery ==
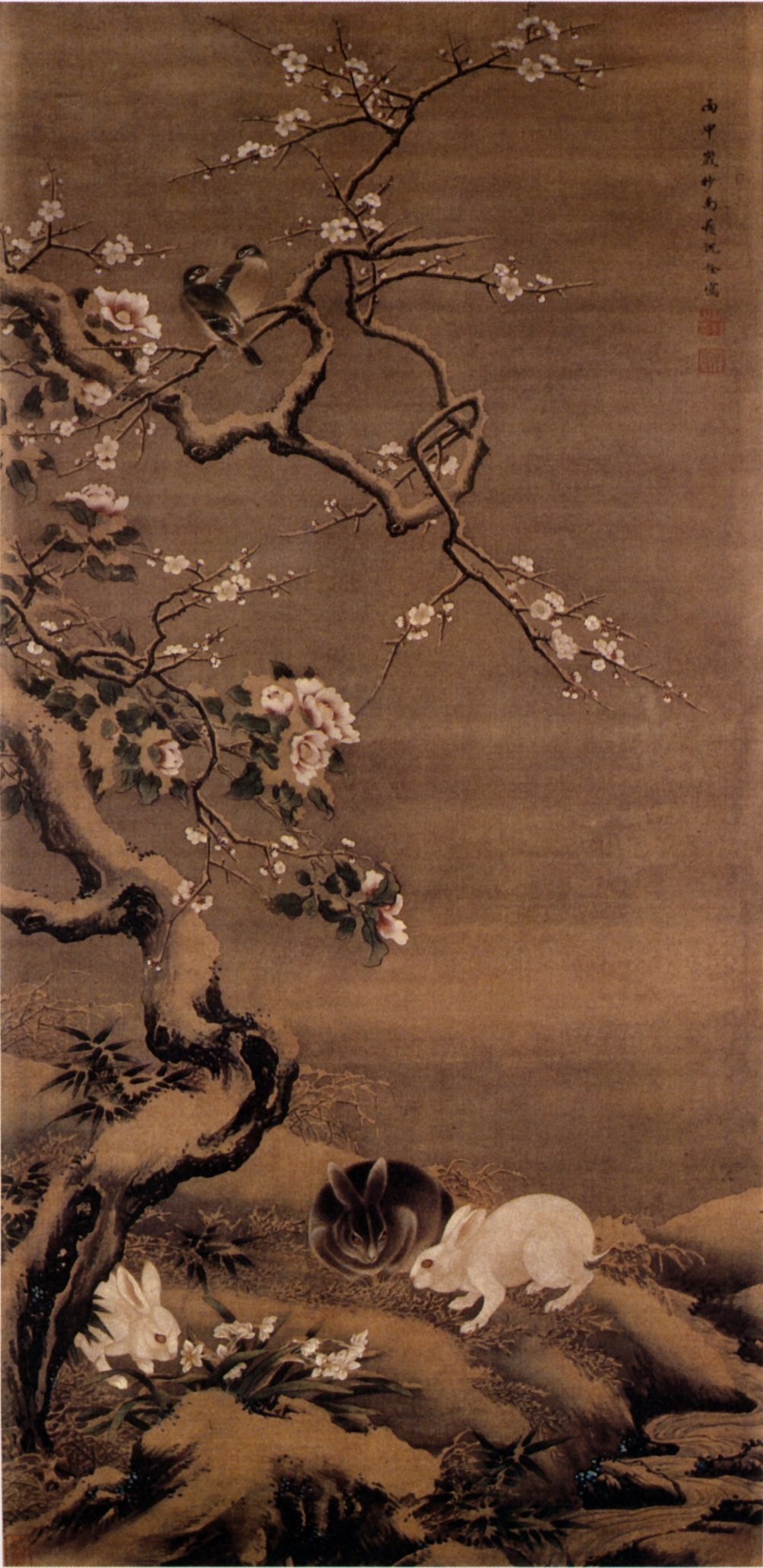
Pair of Hares and Plum Blossom in the Snow, 1716

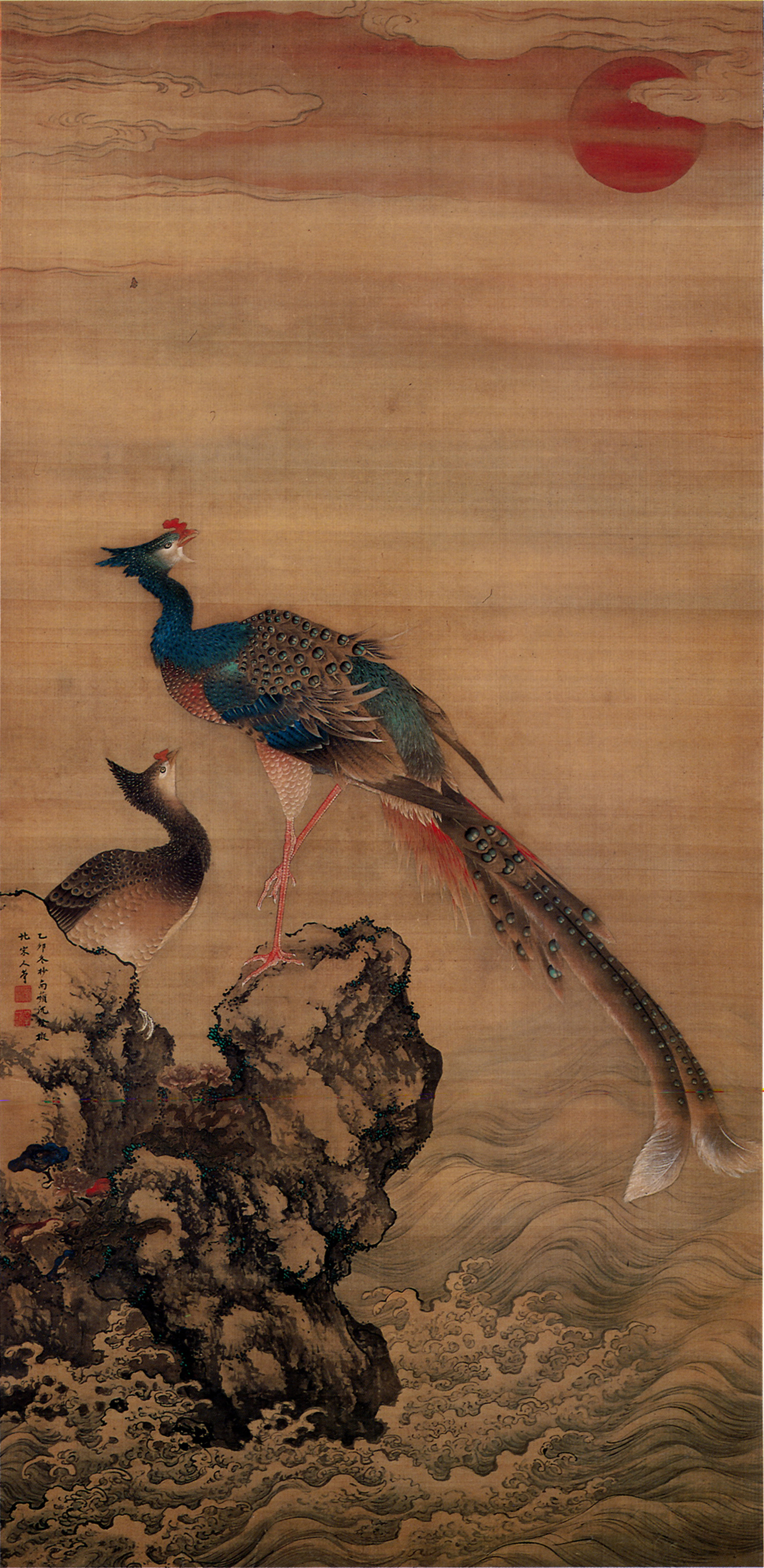
Pair of Phoenixes in the Morning Glow, 1735

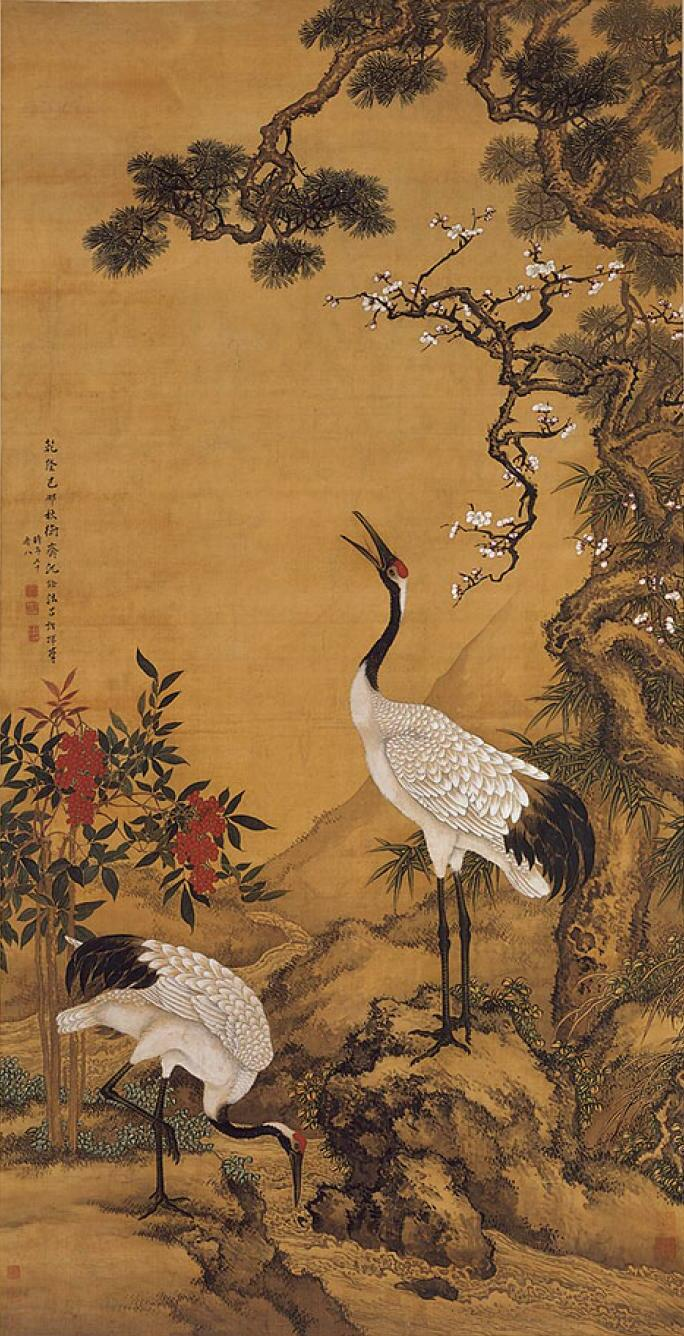
Pine, Plum and Cranes, 1759

== See also ==
- Nanpin school
- Kumashiro Yūhi
- Sō Shiseki
- Bird-and-flower painting
- Chinese painting
- Japanese painting
