= Huang Jucai =

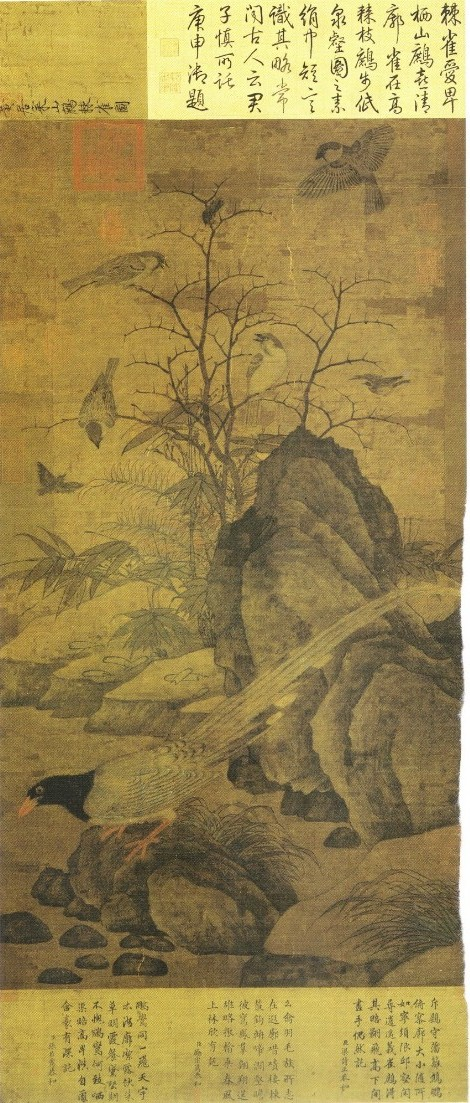

Huang Jucai (c. 933 – after 993), courtesy name Boluan, was a Chinese painter during the Later Shu and Song dynasties. He was the fourth son of renowned painter Huang Quan. Like his father Huang Quan, Huang Jucai was highly prolific. As mentioned in the 1120 catalog Xuanhe Huapu, 332 of his works were in the collection of Emperor Huizong of Song, of which few have survived.

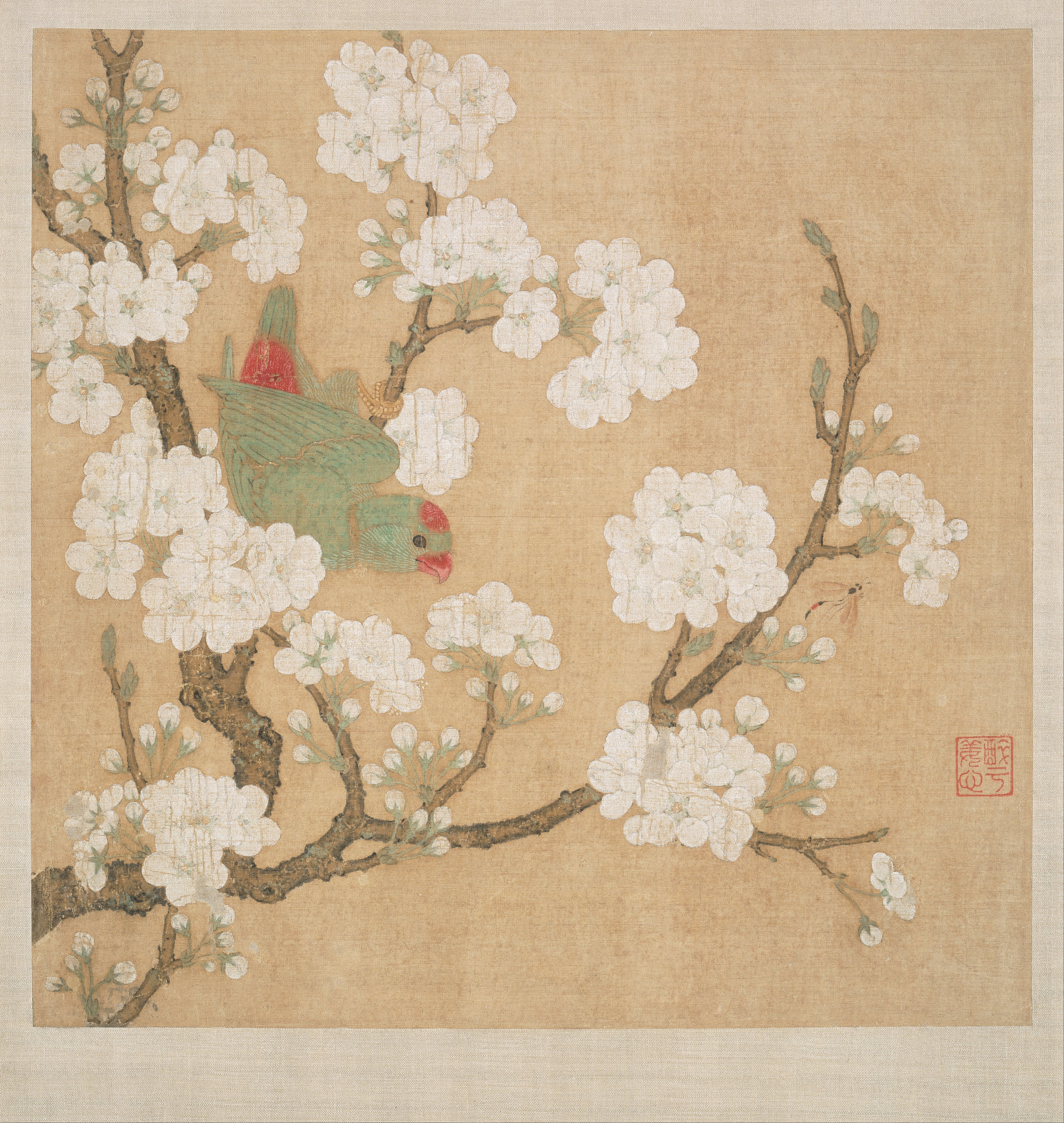
