= Kumashiro Yūhi =

Japanese painter (1712–1773)

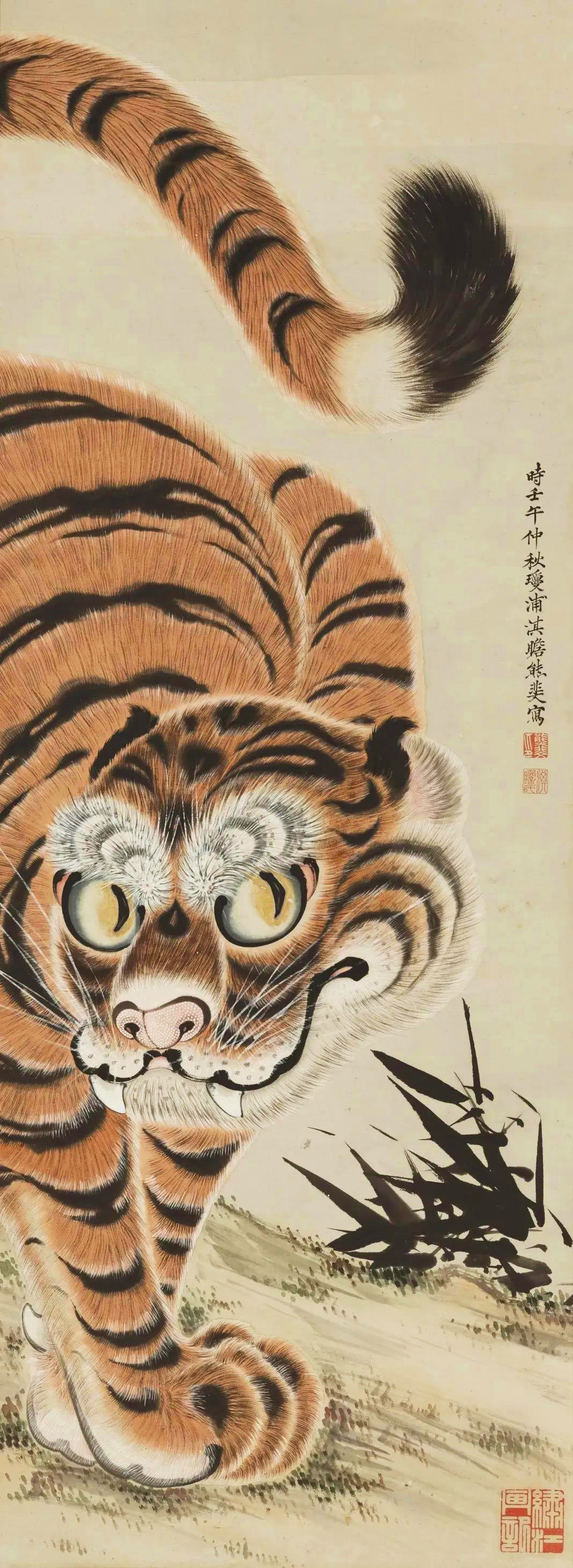
Tiger, hanging scroll, 1762

Kumashiro Yūhi (熊代 熊斐; 1712 – 1772 or 1773) was a Japanese painter of the Edo period. A member of the Nanpin school, he worked in Nagasaki, where he studied art under the Chinese painter Shen Quan (1682–1760).

== Names ==
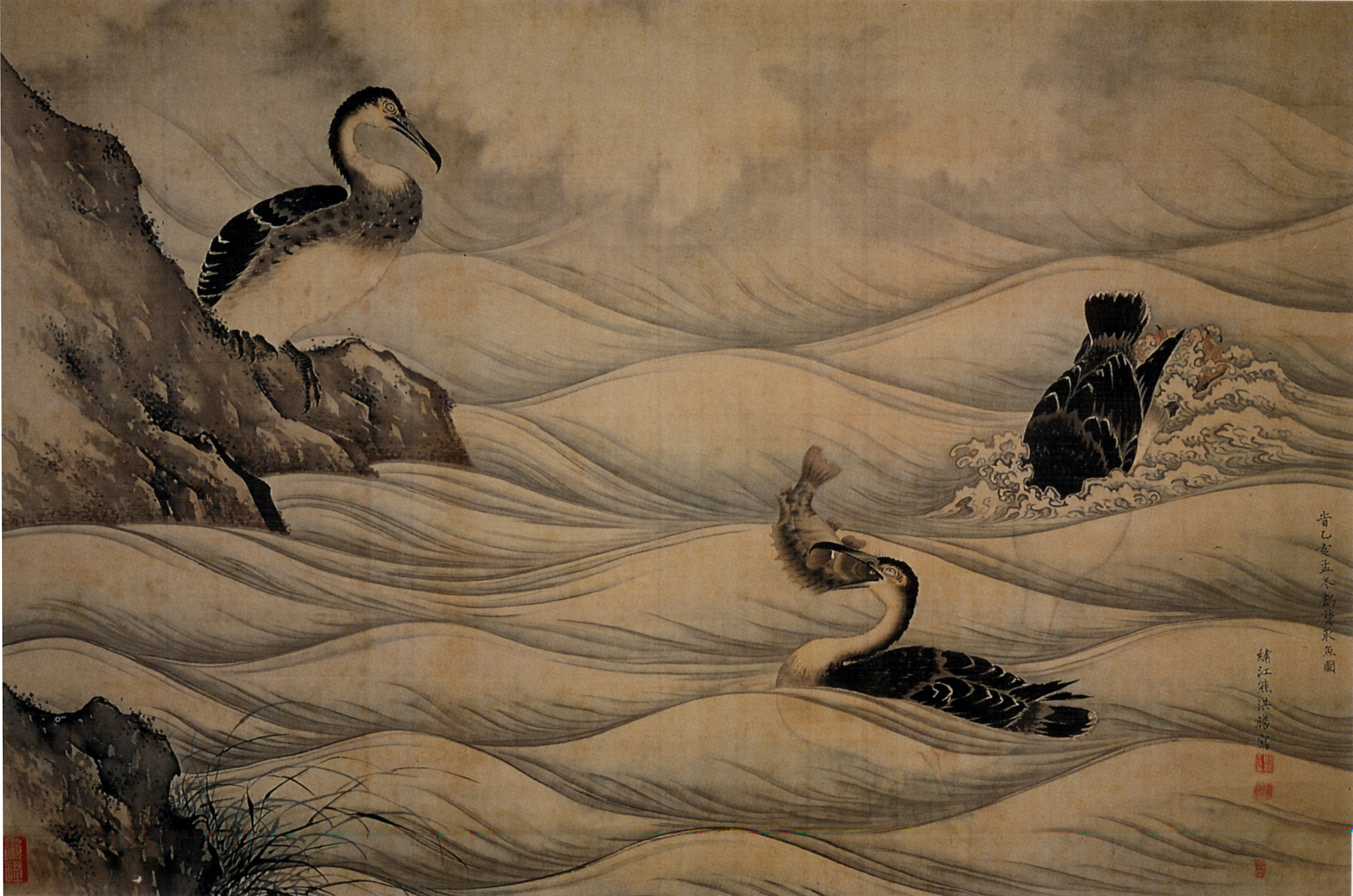
Cormorants Catching Fish, 1755

Yūhi's birth name was Kumashiro Ayaru (神代 斐). His common name was Hikonoshin (彦之進), and later, Jinzaemon (甚左衛門). His courtesy name was Kisen (淇瞻), and his art name was Shūkō (繡江).

Today, he is usually called Yūhi (熊斐), his Chinese-style sobriquet, which were popular among Japanese artists who studied Chinese arts and poetry during the Edo period.

== Biography ==
Yūhi was born to the Kumashiro (神代) family, a family that supplied the government with tōtsūji, or Japanese-Chinese interpreters. His father was one such translator. At age 21, Yūhi became an apprentice translator, but never advanced beyond that.

In 1731, he became the pupil of Shen Quan (沈銓), a visiting Chinese painter who stayed in Nagasaki until 1733. Later, he continued studying under Gao Qian (高乾), another disciple of Shen Quan. During this time, the Nanpin school of art was established in Japan, largely based on earlier styles of the Ming and Qing dynasties, which focused mainly on bird-and-flower painting (kachōga). The school was named after Nanpin, which was Shen Quan's art name, and Yūhi was considered one of the school's most passionate members.

In one instance, when Yūhi was asked to paint a tiger, he approached a caged tiger brought by a foreigner, and struck it on the head with a bamboo pole to see it move. It roared, scaring off the other bystanders, but he continued to sketch the tiger, refusing to leave. (Note: Account as described in volume 5 of the Zoku Kinsei Kinjiden, a register of Japanese eccentrics and hermits.)

Yūhi's art was esteemed by the Japanese public, who regarded his paintings as a worthy native substitute for Chinese works, which were hard to find in Japan. Later, he went on to teach other artists, such as Sō Shiseki, Mori Ransai (森 蘭斎) and Kakutei (鶴亭). His students would then spread this "Nagasaki style" of art to major cities like Edo, Osaka and Kyoto.

== Gallery ==
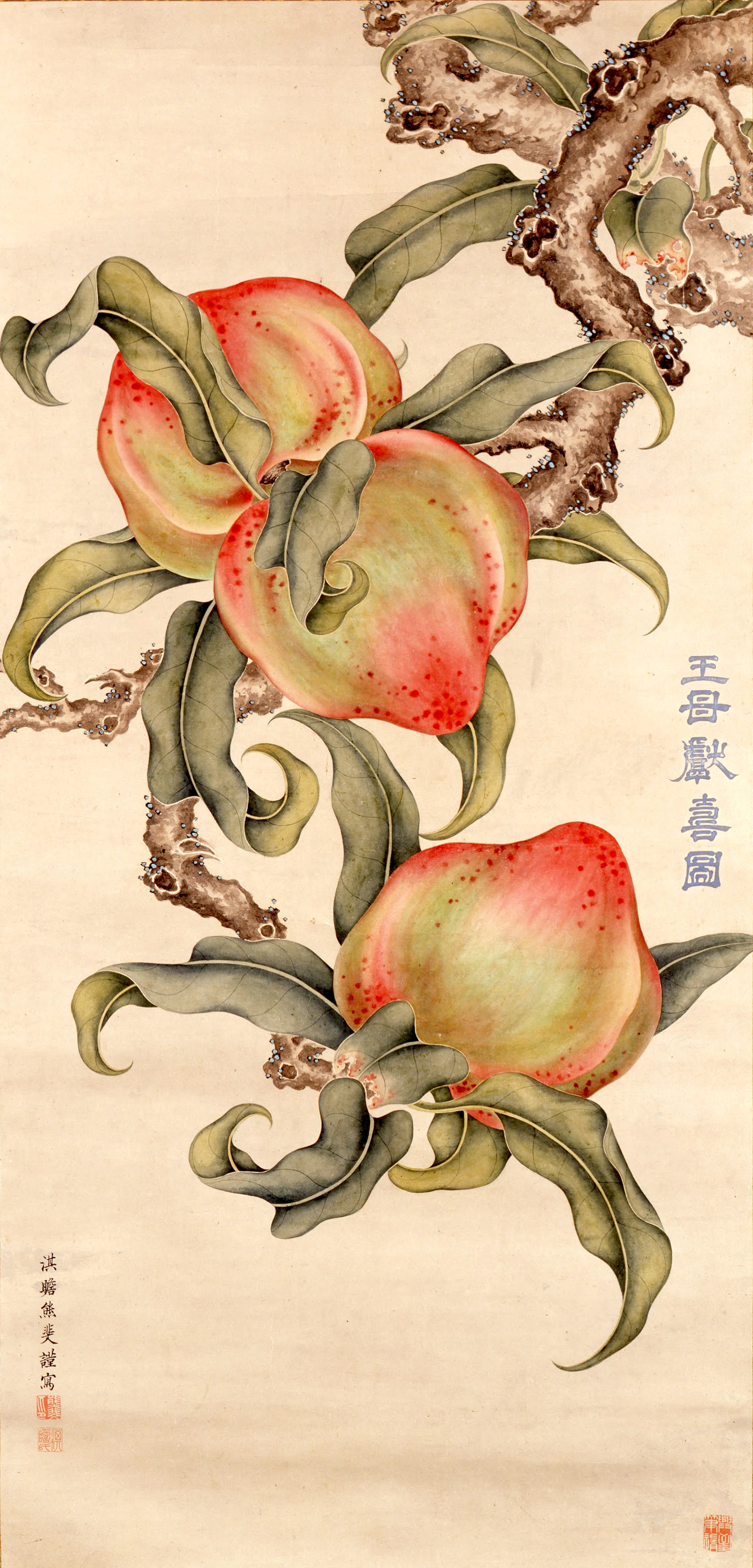
Xiwangmu's Peaches of Immortality

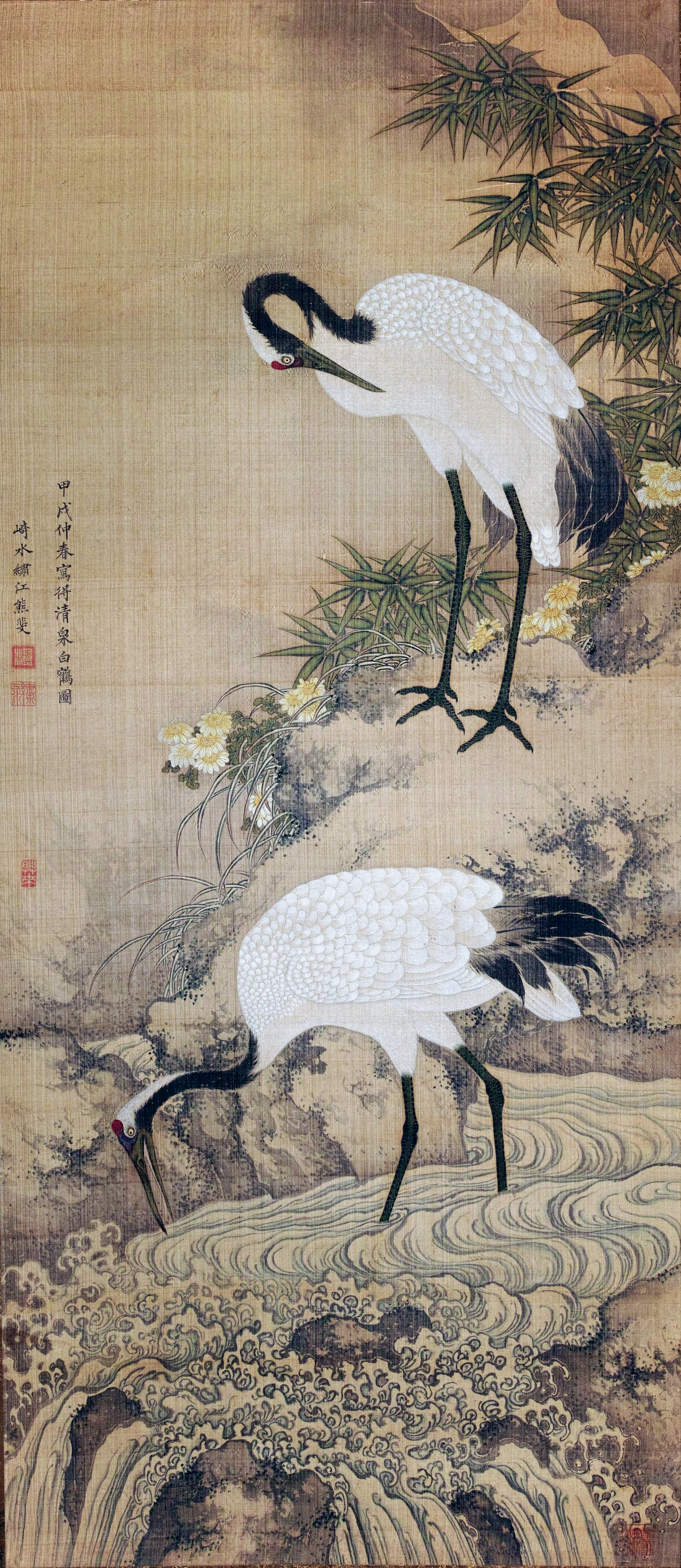
Two Cranes at a Clear Stream, 1754

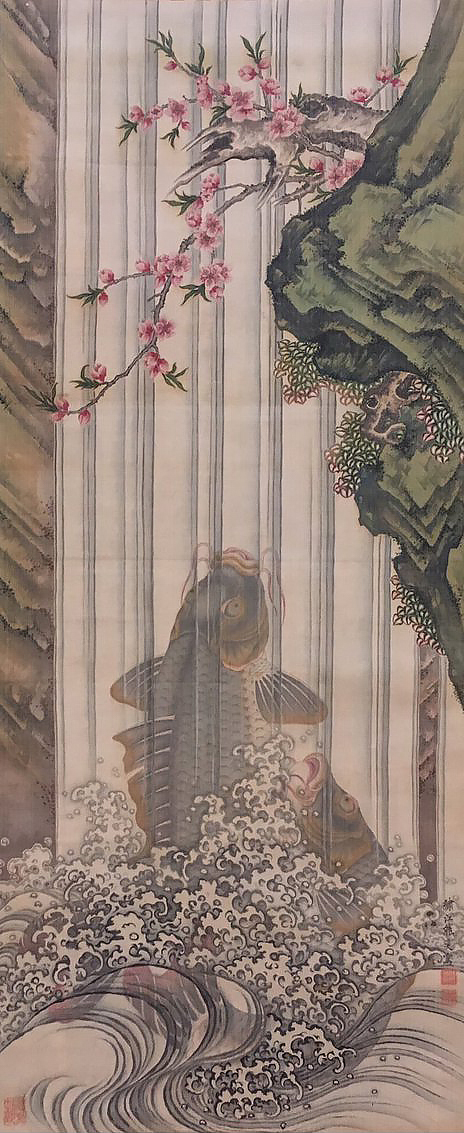
Carp Leaping the Dragon Gate

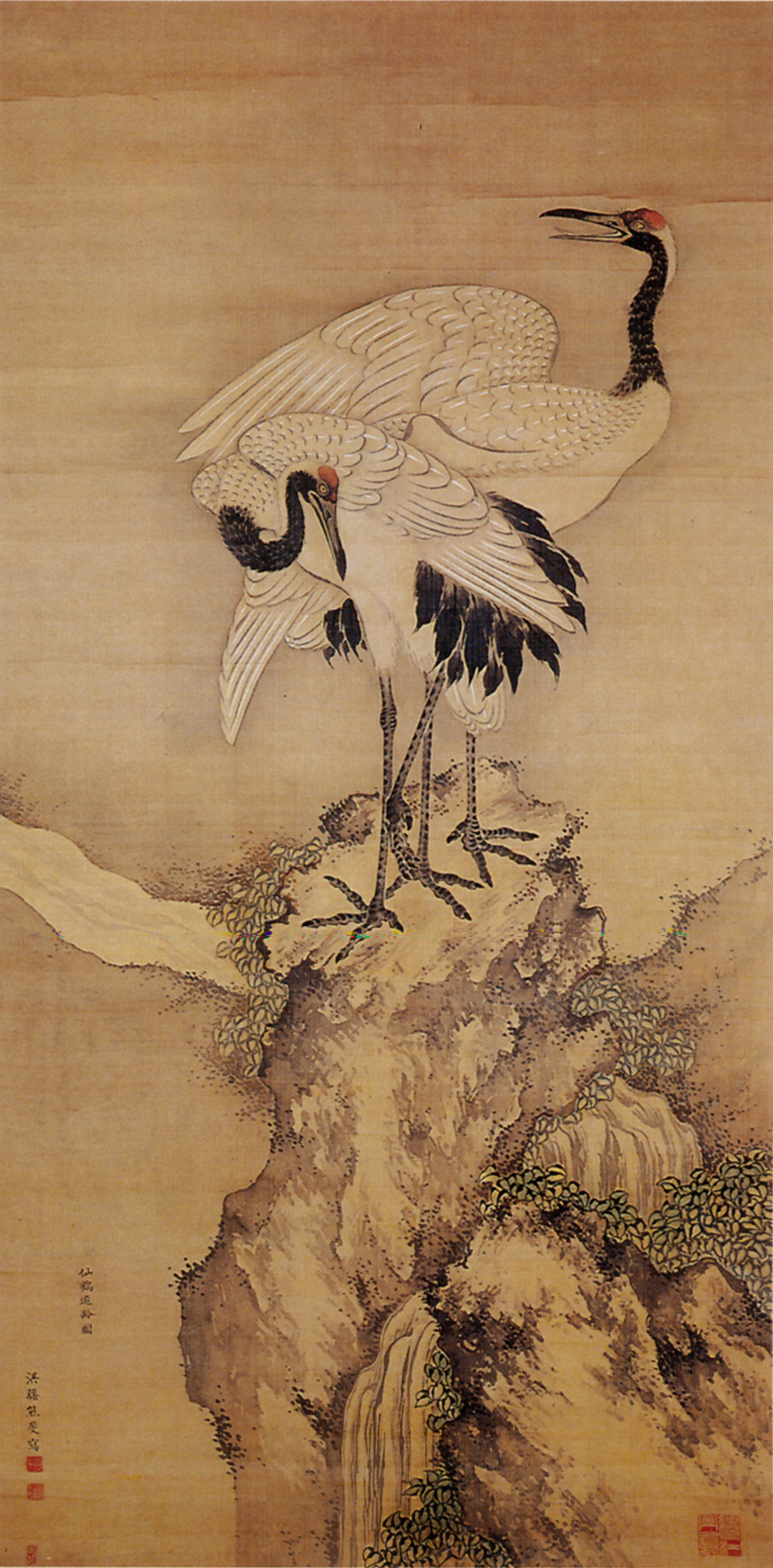
Two Immortal Cranes of Longevity

== See also ==
- Shen Quan
- Sō Shiseki
- Nanpin school
- Nanga
- Bird-and-flower painting
