= Kumashiro =

Kumashiro (written: 熊代 or 神代) is a Japanese surname. Notable people with the surname include:

- Akihiko Kumashiro (熊代 昭彦, born 1940), Japanese politician
- Masato Kumashiro (熊代 聖人, born 1989), Japanese baseball player
- Tatsumi Kumashiro (神代 辰巳, 1927–1995), Japanese film director
- Kumashiro Yūhi (熊代 熊斐, 1712-1772), Japanese painter of the Edo period
