= Lü Ji =

Lü Ji may refer to:

- King Yong Ji of Shang, recorded as Lü Ji in oracle bones
- Duke Ding of Qi, personal name Lü Ji
- Lü Ji (painter) (born 1477), Chinese painter of flower and bird works during the Ming Dynasty
- Lü Ji (composer) (1909–2002), Chinese composer, writer on music, music educator, and administrator

== See also ==
- Lu Ji (disambiguation)
