= Huang Quan =

Huang Quan may refer to:

- Huang Quan (general) (died 240), general during the Han dynasty and Three Kingdoms periods
- Huang Quan (painter) (903–968), painter during the Five Dynasties and Song dynasty periods

== See also ==
- Diyu, Chinese hell (realm of the dead), also known as "Huangquan" (Chinese: 黄泉; lit. 'Yellow Spring')
- Yomi, Japanese hell (realm of the dead)
