= Xu Xi =

Xu Xi is the name of:

- Xu Xi (painter) (died before 976), Southern Tang painter
- Xu Xi (writer) (born 1954), Hong Kong writer
