= Lu Ji =

Lu Ji may refer to:

- Lu Ji (Gongji) (陸績), courtesy name Gongji (公紀), Eastern Wu official, one of The Twenty-four Filial Exemplars
- Lu Ji (Shiheng) (陸機), courtesy name Shiheng (士衡), Eastern Wu and Jin Dynasty poet

== See also ==
- Lü Ji (disambiguation)
