= Imao Keinen =

Japanese painter and print designer (1845–1924)

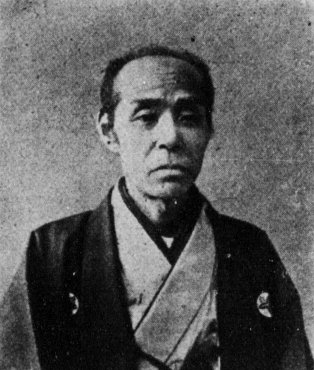
Imao Keinen

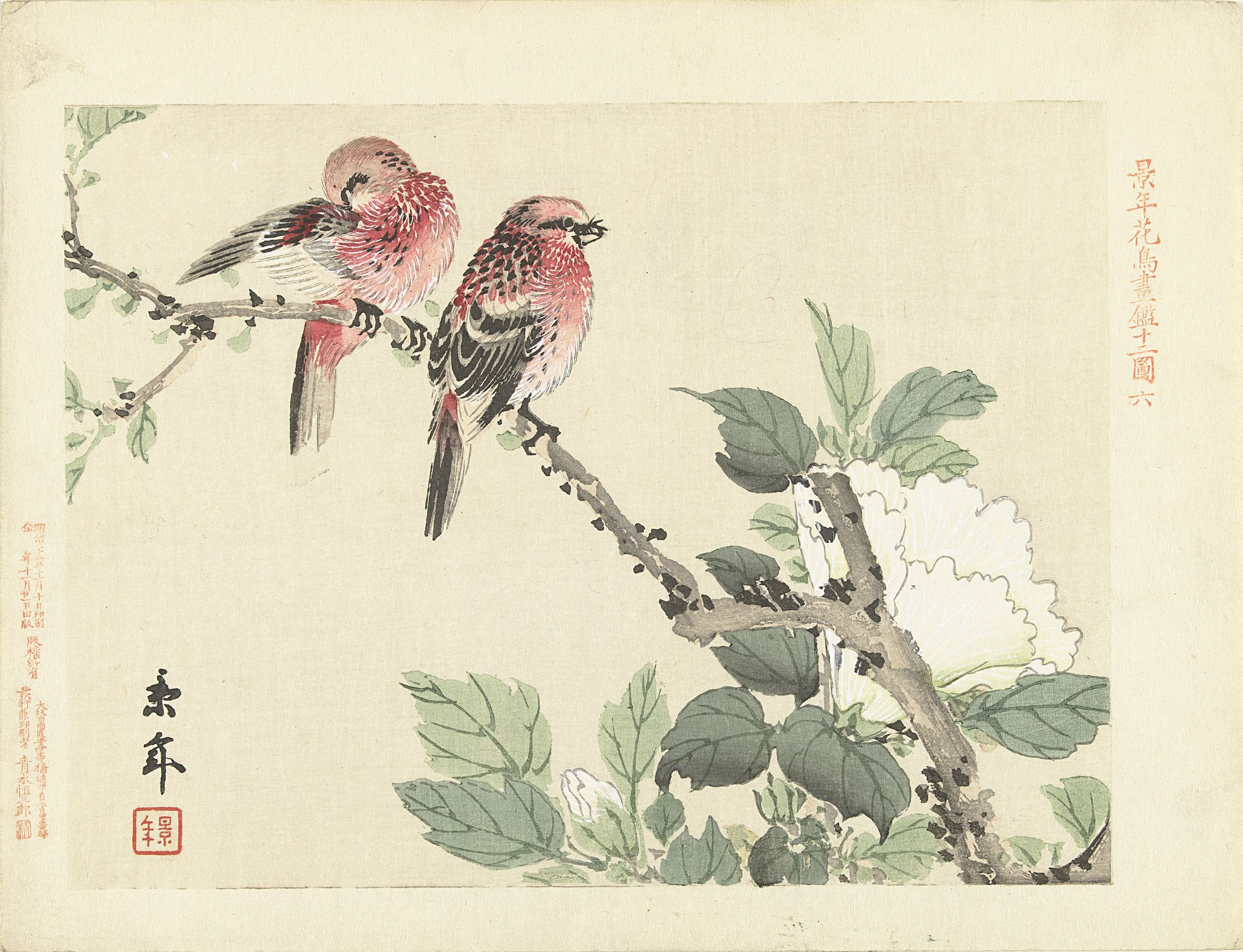
Illustration of two red birds and a white flower, from the Keinen Kachō Gafu album (1892)

Imao Keinen (今尾 景年; Kyoto 1845 – 1924) was a Japanese painter and print designer of the late 19th and early 20th centuries, part of the shin-hanga ("new prints") movement. In 1904 he became a member of the Art Committee and was appointed as an Imperial Household Artist.

== Biography ==
From the age of 12, Keinen received a comprehensive education in various Japanese art styles: classical Japanese painting, printmaking, and calligraphy. In 1880 he received a professorship at the Kyoto School of Painting. Following the publication of the Keinen Kachō Gafu album in 1892, he became a member of the Art Committee of the imperial court and in 1919 a member of the Imperial Academy of Fine Arts.

The Keinen Kachō Gafu (景年花鳥畫譜), published in 1892, is an album with an extensive series of bird-and-flower (kachō-e) in woodblock print.

His works are part of many museum collections throughout the world.
