= Nanpin school =

School of art in Japan

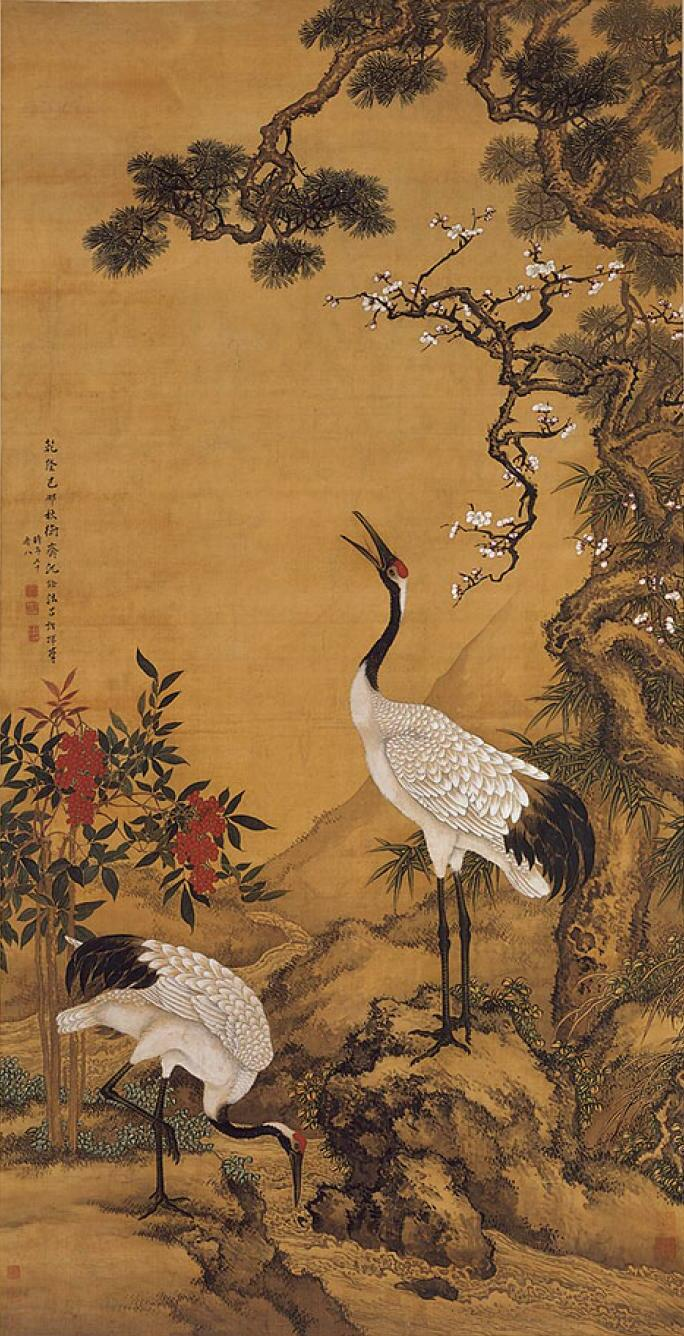
Pine, Plum and Cranes by Shen Quan, 1759. Hanging scroll, ink and colour on silk. The Palace Museum, Beijing

The Nanpin school (南蘋派 Nanpin-ha) was a Japanese school of painting which flourished in Nagasaki during the Edo period.

== Etymology ==
The school takes its name from Nanpin, the art name of Chinese painter Shen Quan (1682–1760), an artist who painted in the Ming academic style.

== History ==
Shen Quan arrived in Nagasaki on the 37th ship on December 3, 1731, and left Japan two years later, on September 18, 1733. He specialised in bird-and-flower painting (Ch: huaniao hua, J: kachōga), one of the major artistic subjects, especially among professional Chinese painters.

The commercial activity in the port of Nagasaki facilitated the spread of Western knowledge in Japan. Japanese people were also particularly interested in ancient Chinese culture. Paintings of the Nanpin school show flora and fauna that are not just "realistic", but styled as they appear in Chinese and European treatises.

In the 18th century, Japanese people became very interested in Western natural sciences, even if that did not mean a break from Chinese tradition. Chinese and Western treatises on natural sciences could have played a key role in the spread of knowledge on subjects such as botany, zoology, and mineralogy, and that the images featured in these treatises might have inspired artists to choose and create new representations of bird-and-flower. That is why scholar Meccarelli has called the style of the Nanpin school "flora and fauna decorative painting'. In the Nanping painting school, the decorative aspect was even more emphasised, because paintings had to satisfy the taste of merchants.

== Notable artists ==
- Kumashiro Yūhi (1712–1772)
- Zheng Pei (fl. mid-18th century)
- Sō Shiseki (1715–1786)

== See also ==
- Nanga (Japanese painting)
