= Huang Quan (painter) =

Chinese painter (903–965)

Huang Quan (黃筌)
- Born: 903; Chengdu, Tang
- Died: 965; Kaifeng, Song
- Style: Bird-and-flower painting
- Children: Huang Jubao (黃居寶); Huang Jucai (黃居寀); 3 other sons

Chinese name
- Traditional Chinese: 黃筌
- Simplified Chinese: 黄筌
Transcriptions
Standard Mandarin
- Hanyu Pinyin: Huáng Quán
- Wade–Giles: Huang^{2} Ch'üan^{2}

Huang Yaoshu
- Traditional Chinese: 黃要叔
- Simplified Chinese: 黄要叔
Transcriptions
Standard Mandarin
- Hanyu Pinyin: Huáng Yàoshū

Huang Quan (903–965), courtesy name Yaoshu, was a Chinese painter during the Five Dynasties period and the Song dynasty who worked in the imperial painting academies of the Former Shu, Later Shu and Song dynasties. Along with Xu Xi, Huang is considered a founding master of the bird-and-flower painting.

Huang Quan was highly prolific: the 1120 catalog Xuanhe Huapu alone critiques 349 of his works. However, few are extant.

== Early life ==
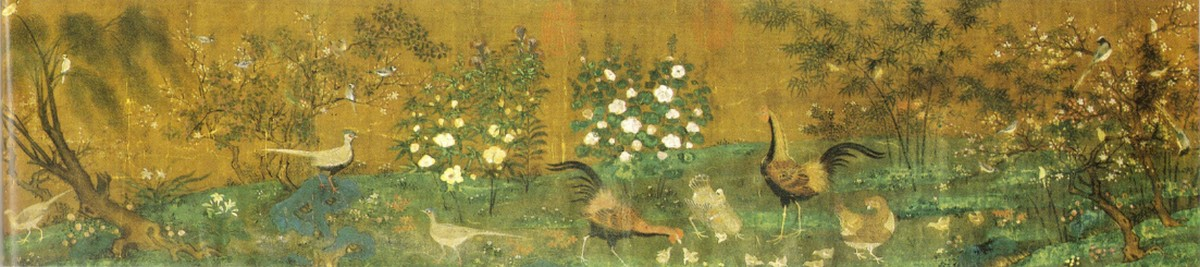

Huang Quan was born in 903, when the Tang empire had irretrievably collapsed into warlordism and civil strife. Around this time, many painters took refuge in Chengdu, Huang Quan's hometown and the capital of the relatively peaceful Xichuan Circuit, then controlled by the warlord Wang Jian. (Wang Jian founded the Former Shu empire in 907 after the Tang dynasty ended.) When Huang Quan was 12, he began his study of painting with the bird-and-flower painter Diao Guangyin (刁光胤), who had arrived in Chengdu from the Tang capital Chang'an in 903. Whereas Diao's other student Kong Song (孔嵩) never progressed beyond faithful reproduction of Diao's technique, Huang Quan sought to develop his own. He studied the water paintings of Sun Wei (孫位), another refugee from Chang'an, as well as the landscape paintings of Li Sheng (李昇), a leading local painter. By combining the strengths of all his teachers Huang was able to create a superior style.

In 919, the 16-year-old Huang Song became an imperial attendant (待詔) in the Painting Academy of Former Shu, which probably lasted until 925 when the Former Shu was conquered by the Later Tang empire.

== Under Later Shu ==
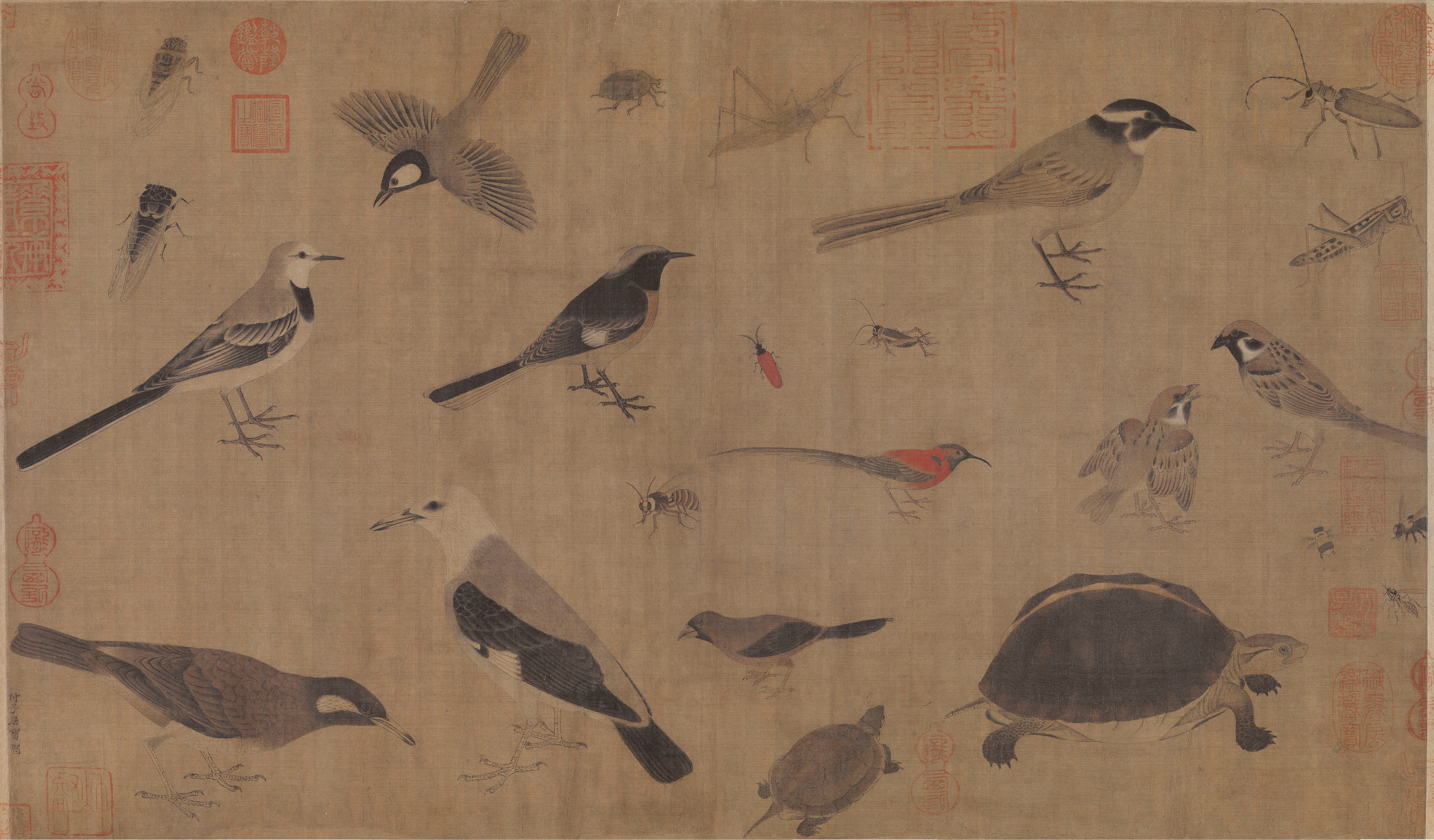
