= Sō Shiseki =

Japanese painter

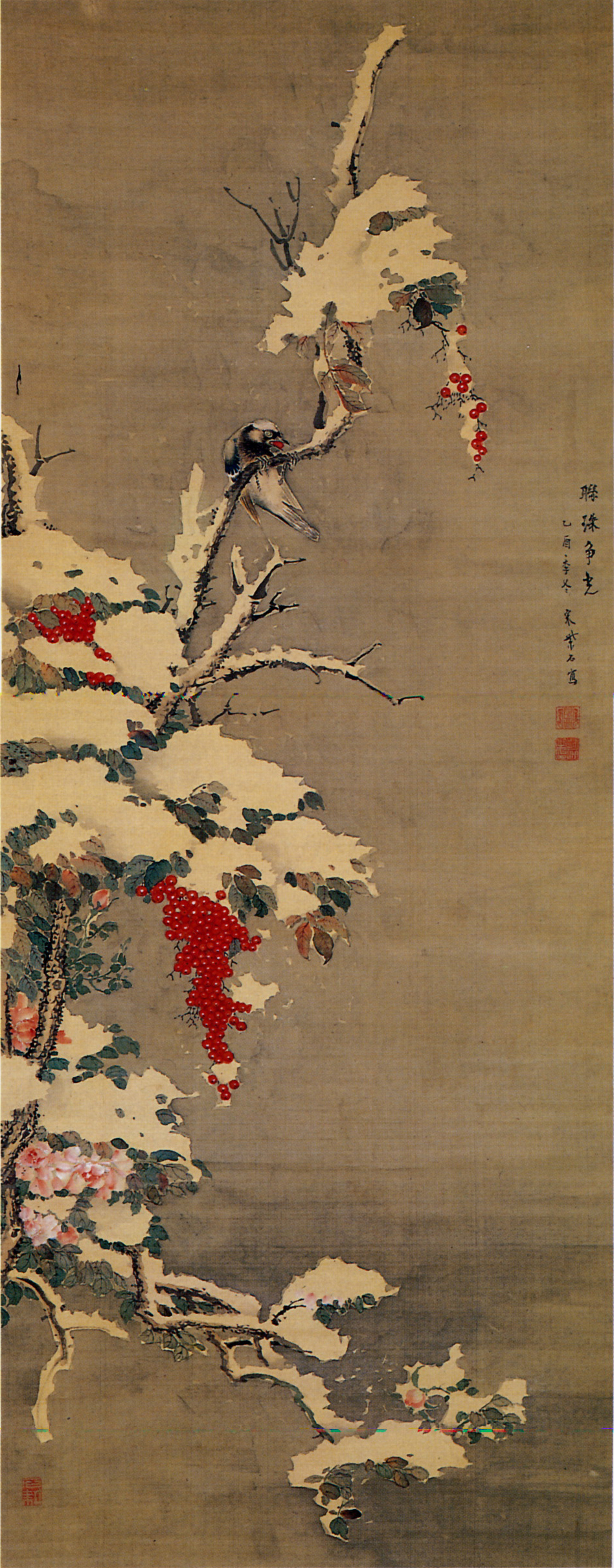
"Flowers and Birds in the Snow" 1765. Hanging scroll; color on silk. Kobe City Museum.

Sō Shiseki (宋 紫石, 1715 – 9 April 1786) was a Japanese painter of the Nagasaki and Nanpin schools.

Originally from Edo, he spent some time in Nagasaki, where he studied under the Chinese painter Song Ziyan, who was known as Sō Shigan in Japanese. The name Sō Shiseki is an art-name, derived from an imitation of his master's name.

Shiseki's bird and flower paintings and other works display the use of a combination of broad calligraphic brushstrokes for branches, tree trunks and rocks, ink wash and color for flower petals and leaves, and much finer brushstrokes for the fine details of feathers and flowers to produce a very detailed and lifelike, realistic depiction. Returning to Edo, Shiseki became a prominent representative and teacher of the Nagasaki school in that city, teaching Shiba Kōkan among others. He was close with such rangaku scholars as Hiraga Gennai and Sugita Genpaku, and expressed an interest in Western painting. Rather than his stylistic choice coming straight from European painting, however, scholar Meccarelli thinks Shiseki matured Nanpin school’s “flora and fauna decorative painting”. His style is indeed more focused on details, also lending credence to the legacy left by botanic manuals and scientific treatises. He composed a number of books, and woodblock printed volumes of his artworks were produced as well.

== See also ==
- Nanpin school
- Bird-and-flower painting
- Japanese painting
