= Lin Liang =

Lin Liang, Birds in Bushes

Lin Liang (Chinese: 林良; pinyin: Lín Liáng; Wade–Giles: Lin Liang) (c. 1424－1500) was a Chinese imperial painter of plum, flower, and fruit works during the Ming Dynasty (1368–1644).

Lin was born in Nanhai in the Guangdong province. His style name was 'Yishan'. Lin often painted with a very unconstrained style. After Yan Cong, whom Lin may have known during his time in the capital, he is considered the first of the Cantonese Painters. He was also known to be very rude only during painting.
