= Bird-and-flower painting =

East Asian painting genre

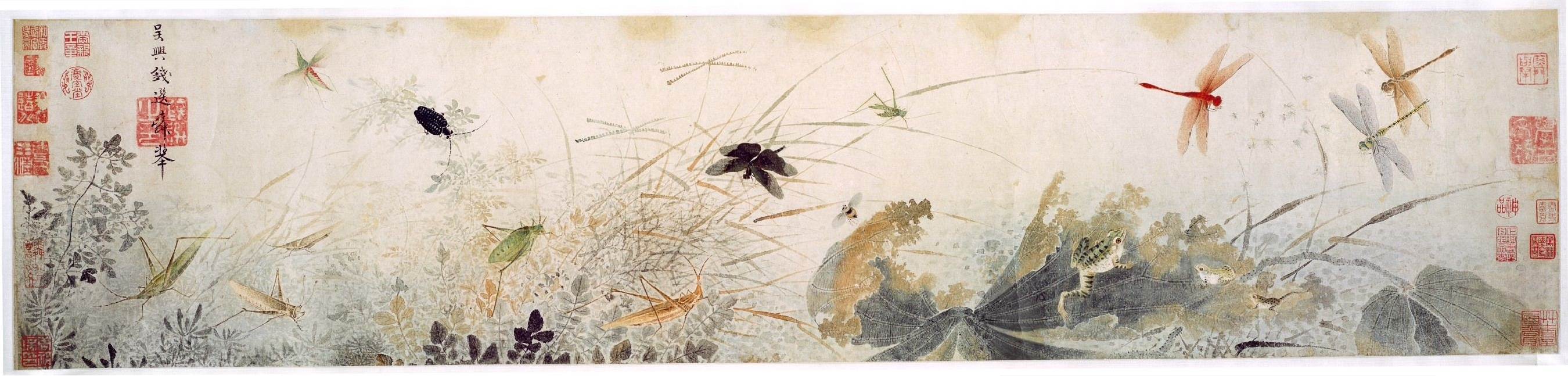
- Early Autumn, 13th century, perhaps by the Song loyalist painter Qian Xuan. The decaying lotus leaves and dragonflies hovering over stagnant water are likely a veiled criticism of Mongol rule.

Chinese name
- Traditional Chinese: 花鳥畫
- Simplified Chinese: 花鸟画
Transcriptions
Standard Mandarin
- Hanyu Pinyin: huāniǎo-huà

Vietnamese name
- Vietnamese alphabet: Hoa điểu hoạ
- Chữ Hán: 花鳥畫

Korean name
- Hangul: 화조화
- Hanja: 花鳥畵
Transcriptions
- Revised Romanization: hwajohwa
- McCune–Reischauer: hwajohwa

Japanese name
- Kanji: 花鳥画
Transcriptions
- Romanization: kachō-ga

Bird-and-flower painting, called Huaniaohua (Chinese: 花鳥畫; pinyin: huāniǎohuà) in Chinese, is a kind of Chinese painting with a long tradition in China and is considered one of the treasures of Chinese culture. The huaniaohua was named after its subject matter. It originated in the Tang dynasty where it gained popularity, matured by the end of that period and during the Five Dynasties and Ten Kingdoms period, and fully reached its peak during the Song dynasty. Most huaniaohua paintings belong to the scholar-artist style of Chinese painting. In the coming centuries, the genre gained popularity and spread throughout the East Asian cultural sphere. It also had an influence on Iranian painting in the golomorgh genre of illustration for book covers and illuminated manuscripts.

== Intended purpose and cultural significance ==
According to Chinese tradition, the huaniaohua covers "flowers, birds, fish, and insects" (Chinese: 花鳥魚蟲; pinyin: huāniǎoyúchóng); thus, it can deal with a wide range of natural topics, including flowers, fish, insects, birds, pets (dogs, cats), etc.

The huaniaohua paintings are inspired by the resilience and the beauty of the flowers and birds found in nature. The intended purpose of the huaniaohua was not simply to imitate nature, but to use different painting styles to convey the personality and ideas of the artist. In Chinese culture, different types of birds and flowers hold their own symbolic meanings; with some of them even holding auspicious meanings, scholarly and human virtues, as well as principles.

Scholar-artists, in particular, developed a freehand-style of painting as a means to express their emotions. They considered Chinese calligraphy and poetry as being an integral component of their huaniaohua painting by giving their ares a deeper spiritual meaning.

== Schools and great artists ==
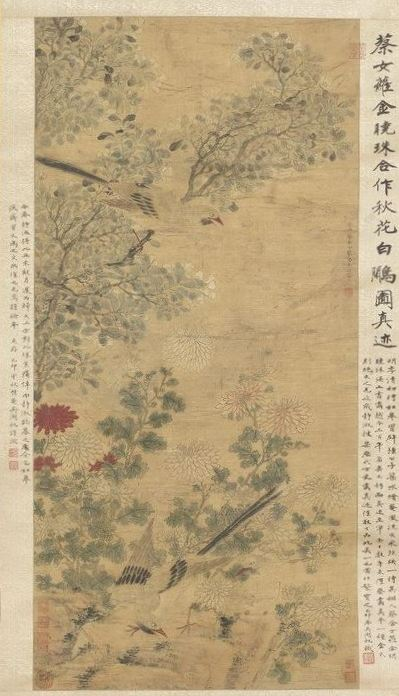
Bird-and-flower painting by Cai Han and Jin Xiaozhu, c. 17th century

The huaniaohua is proper of 10th century China; and the two most representative artists of this period are Huang Quan (哳㥳) (903–965), who was an imperial painter for many years, and Xu Xi (徐熙) (937–975), who came from a prominent family but never entered into officialdom.Both Huang Quan and Xu Xi were masters of their two schools.

The first school, led by Huang Quan, was characterized by an "outline" method of brush work, with emphasis on bright colours filling a meticulously detailed outline (gongbi). Huang Quan's paintings were based on exotic flowers, herbs, rare birds and animals which were found in the imperial gardens and palaces; his paintings were characterized by their meticulous nature as well as their bright colours. Huang Quan's painting style was thus acclaimed as Huangjiafugui (lit. 'The Huang school's characteristic magnificience').

The second school was led by Xu Xi whose painting style became known as Xu Xi yeyi (lit. 'Xu Xi's unconventional', 'original charm').His school was typically characterized with the use techniques associated with ink wash painting (Chinese: 水墨画).

These two schools had important influences on huaniaohua paintings of the later centuries.

== Varieties based on painting technique ==
According to painting technique:

- Ink wash painting (水墨花鳥/水墨花鳥畫). Representatives: Lin Liang (林良), Qi Baishi (齊白石), Zhang Daqian (張大千)
- Gongbi or fine-brush huaniao (工筆花鳥/工筆花鳥畫)
  - Gongbi with Ink Wash Painting (工筆水墨/兼工帶水墨). Representatives: Lin Liang (林良), Ren Yi (任頤)
  - Gongbi with Colour (工彩)
    - Gongbi with Heavy Colour (工筆重彩)
    - Gongbi with Light Colour (工筆淡彩). Representatives: Emperor Huizong (趙佶), Lü Ji (呂紀), Lin Liang (林良)
- Xieyi or freehand style (寫意花鳥/寫意花鳥畫)
  - Great xieyi (大寫意)
  - Slight xieyi (小寫意). Representatives: Tang Yin (唐寅), Xu Wei (徐渭), Wu Changshuo (吳昌碩), Ren Yi (任頤)
- Gongbi with xieyi(兼工帶寫)
  - Representatives: Lin Liang (林良), Tang Yin (唐寅), Ma Quan (馬荃)

== In Japan ==
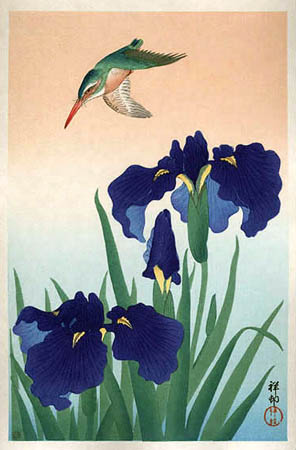
Kingfisher and iris kachō-e woodblock print by Ohara Koson (late 19th century)

Bird-and-flower painting was introduced to Japan during the 14th century, and then to Korea. The bird-and-flower motif started appearing in Japanese art around the Muromachi period during the 14th century, and developed its own distinct style. It also entered ukiyo-e woodblock printing, where it was known as kachō-e (花鳥絵). Especially the shin hanga movement produced a number of works with this motif starting in the Meiji era. Artists working with this were Ohara Koson (1877–1945) and Ito Sozan (1884–?), as well as Imao Keinen (1845–1924). Watanabe Shotei, who had studied in Europe and observed how Western artists used light, shadow, and perspective to create a sense of depth, began producing kachō-ga in this new style after his return to Japan around 1890, completing three albums: the first in 1891, a second in 1903, and a final one, Seitei Kachō Gafu, of twenty-two prints in 1916 with the publisher Tokyo Ōkura. These early shin-hanga-style prints are considered among the finest examples of kachō-e, and Seitei exerted a significant influence on the early shin-hanga movement and on artists such as Ohara Koson and Kiyokata Kaburaki."

== See also ==
- Chinese painting
- Danqing
- Gongbi
- Bamboo painting
- Mogu
- Nanpin school

== Gallery ==
Huaniaohua of China

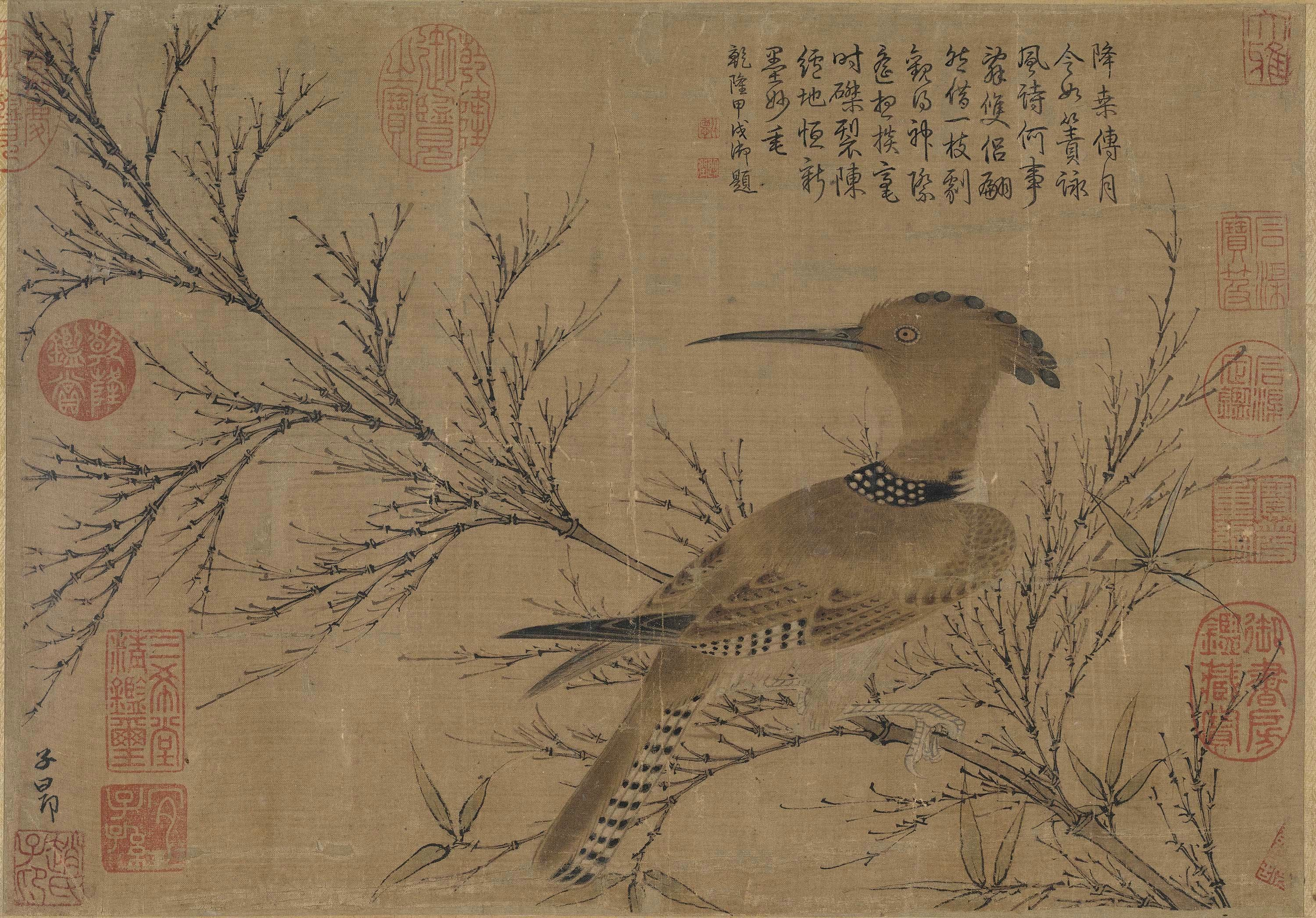

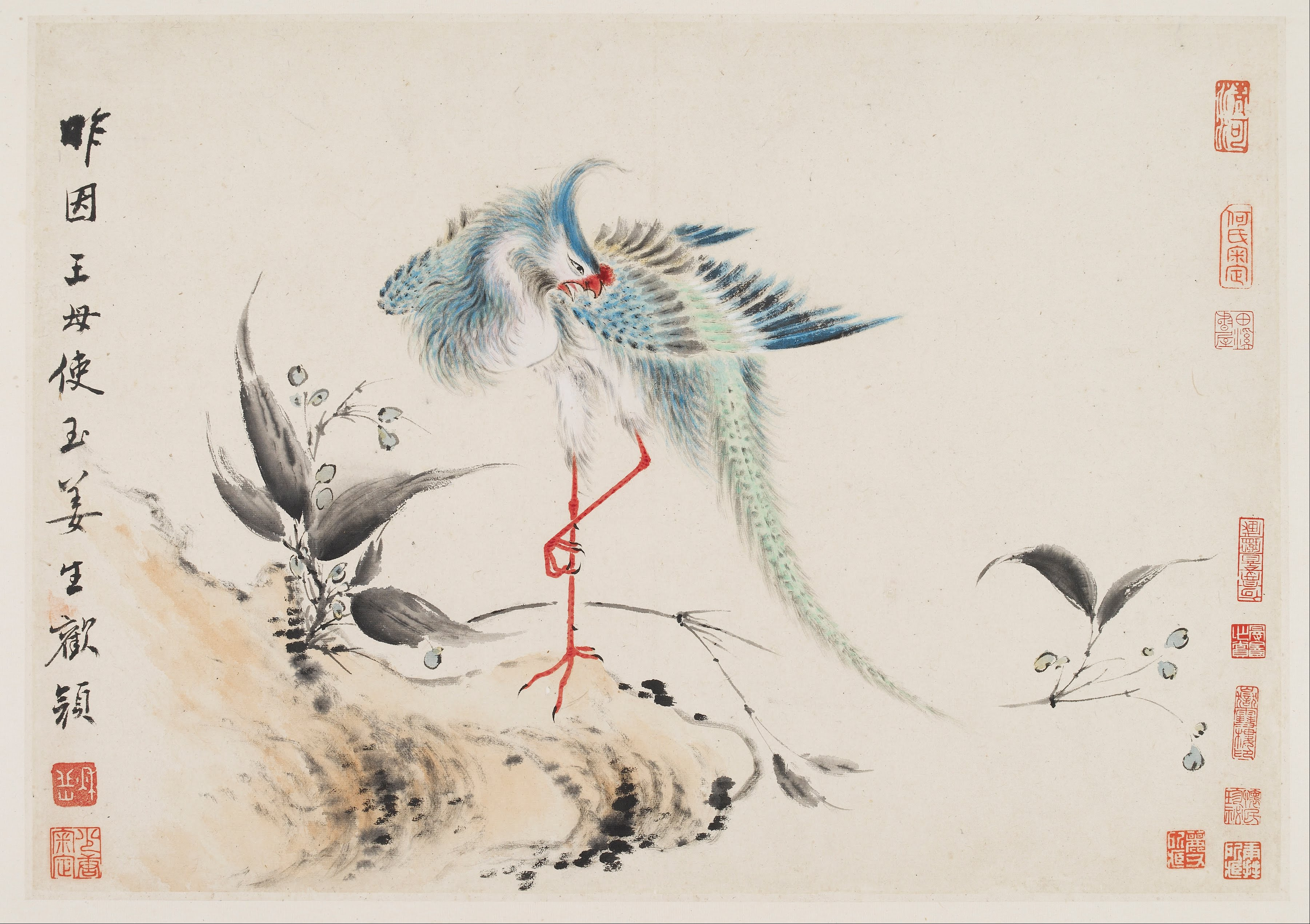

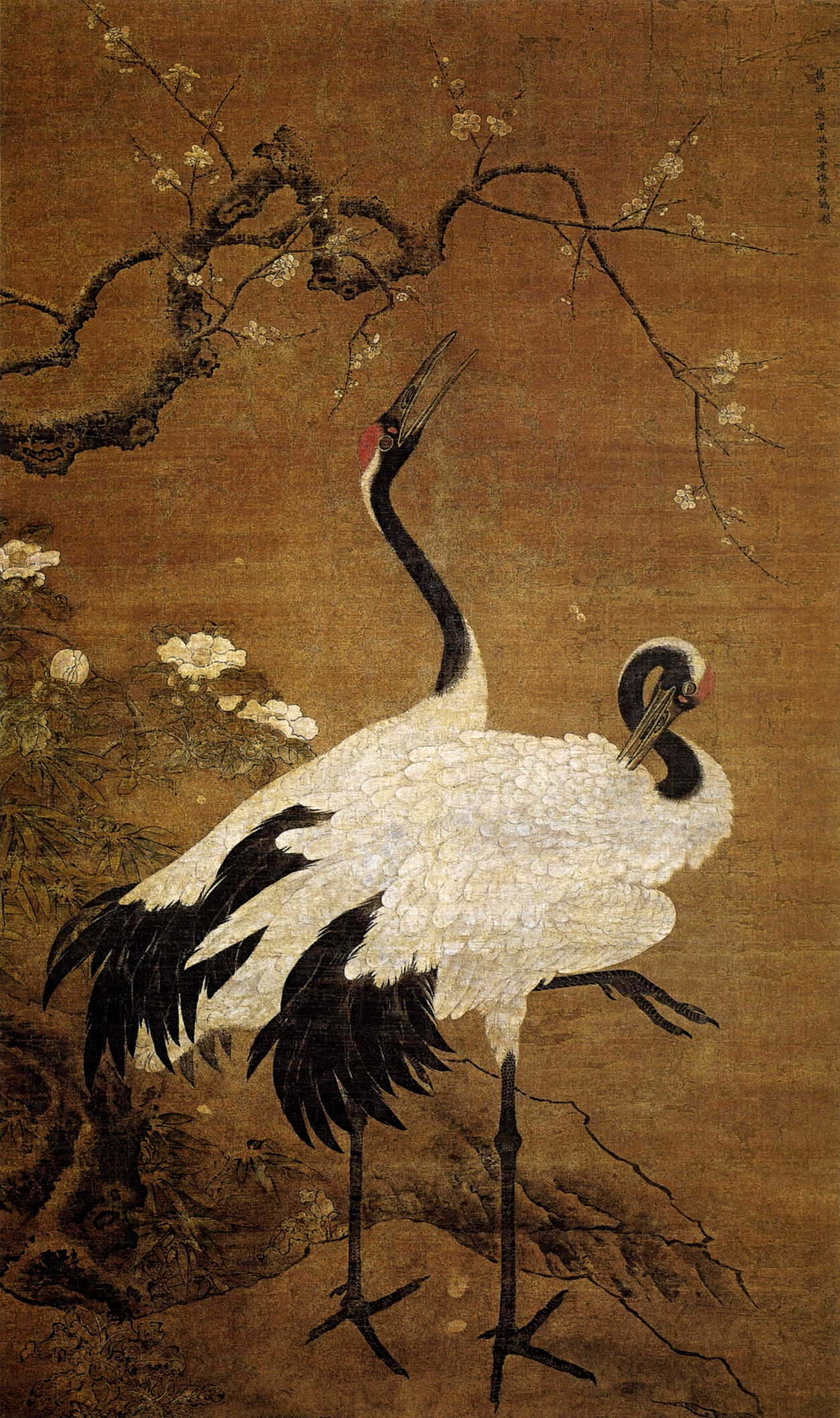

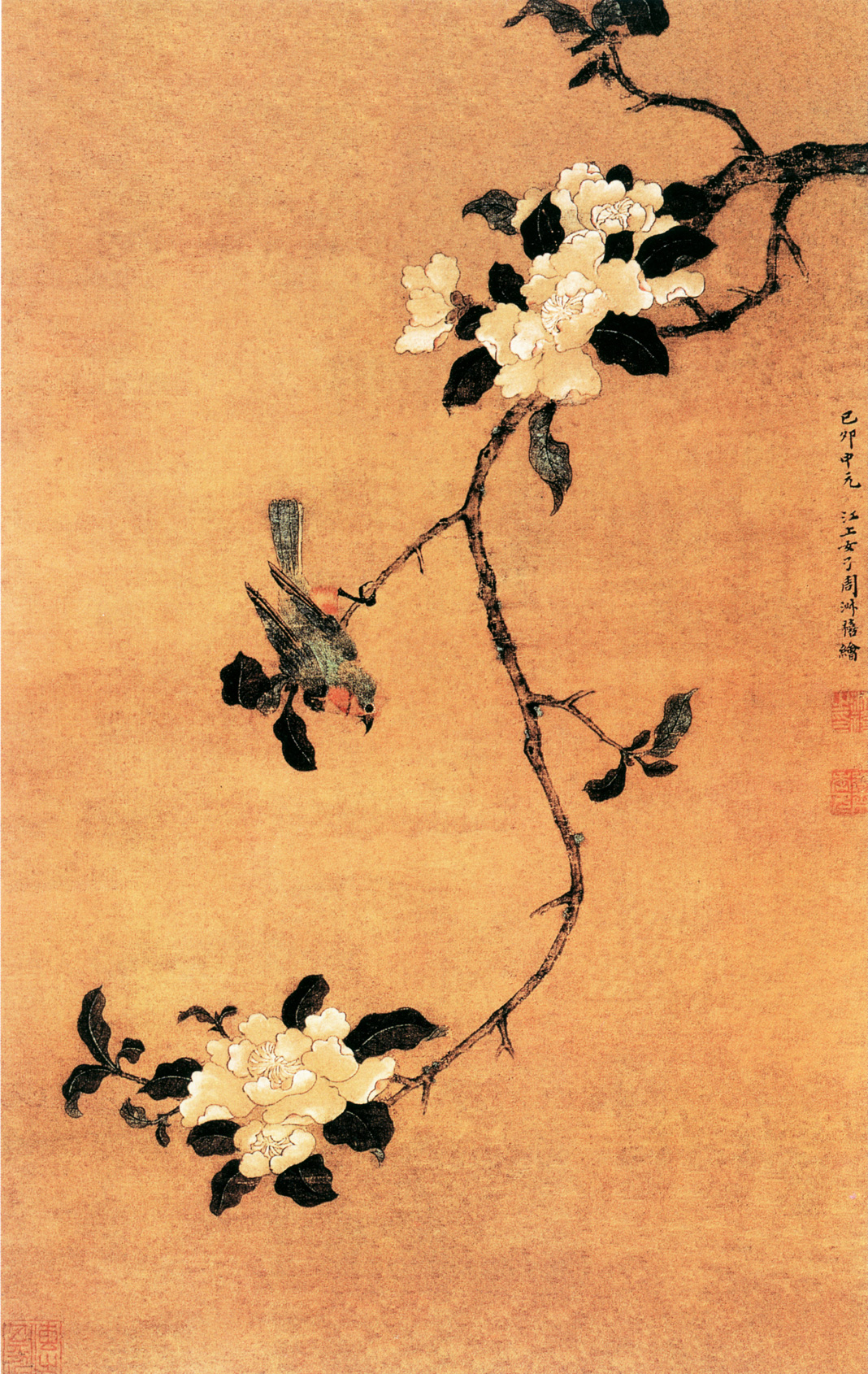
