= Xuanhe Huapu =

Xuanhe Huapu (宣和畫譜, "The Xuanhe Catalogue of Paintings") is an 1120 Chinese palace catalog from the Song dynasty, which in 20 chapters categorized and described ~6396 paintings by 231 artists in the collection of Emperor Huizong of Song. "Xuanhe" (1119–1125) is an era name used by Emperor Huizong. The book is one of the most important sources about 11th/12th-century Chinese art, even if most paintings it described are no longer extant. (Emperor Huizong, a talented painter/connoisseur but inept ruler, was captured by the invading Jin dynasty army in 1127, and his collection was thus lost.)

== Contents ==
The catalog contains 20 chapters, divided into categories:

Chapter(s)	Subject category	Number of scrolls	Number of painters
1–4	Taoism and Buddhism	1179	49
5–7	Portraits	505	33
8	Palaces, buildings, ships, vehicles	71	4
8	Frontier/foreign tribes	133	5
9	Dragons and fish	117	8
10–12	Landscapes	1108	41
13–14	Domestic and wild animals (mammals)	324	27
15–19	Flowers and birds	2786	46
20	Bamboo	148	12
20	Vegetables and fruits	25	6
TOTAL		6396	231

Biographies of artists are arranged under the category for which he was most famous, which are typically accompanied with a critical evaluation of his style.
