= Lü Ji (painter) =

Chinese artist during the Ming Dynasty

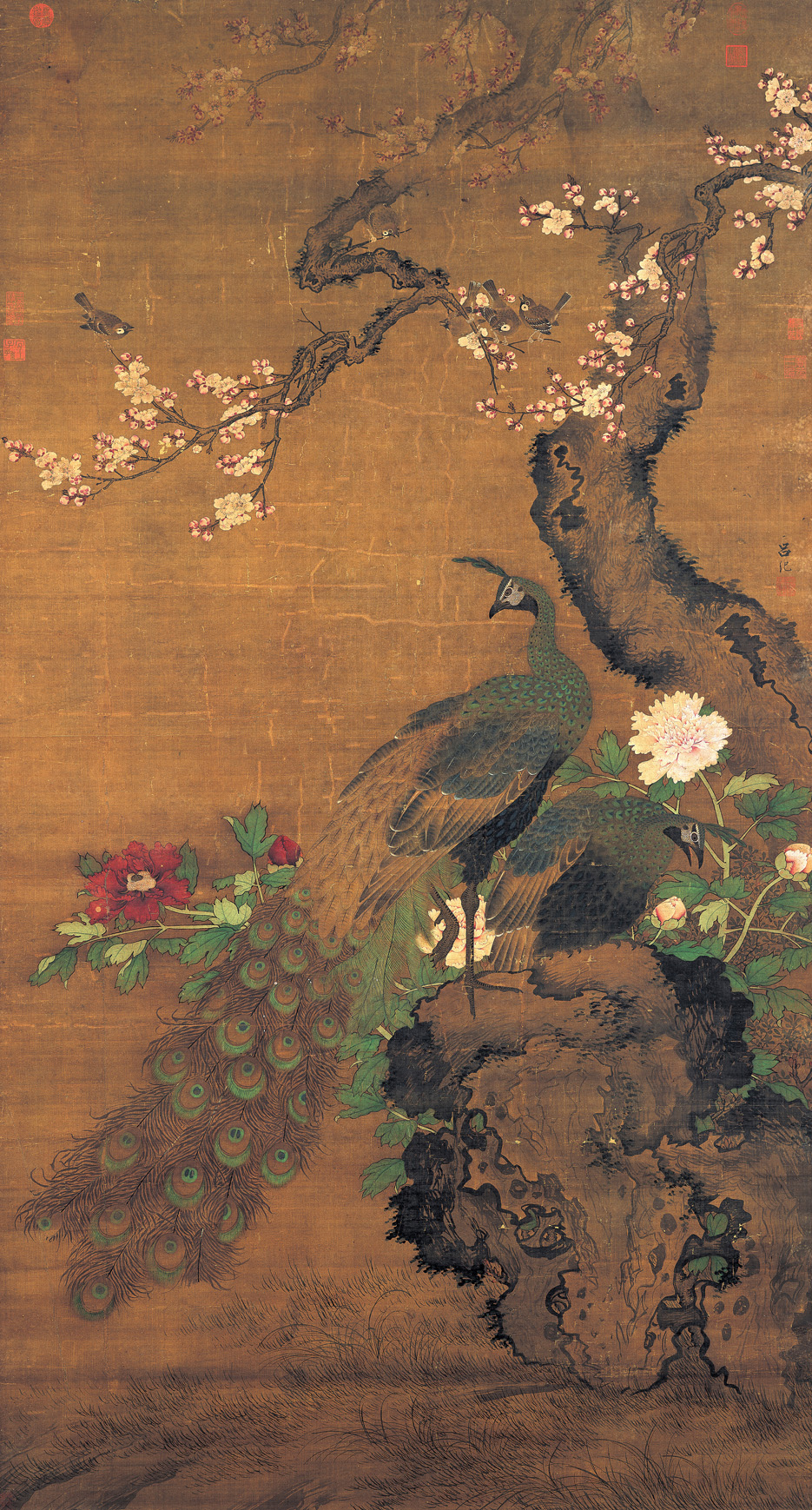
Apricot Blossoms and Peacocks by Lü Ji, National Palace Museum

Lǚ Jì (Lü Chi, traditional: 呂紀, simplified: 吕纪); ca. (1477-unknown) was a Chinese painter of primarily bird and flower works during the Ming Dynasty (1368–1644). His specific date of death is unknown.

Lu was born in Ningbo in the Zhejiang province. His style name was 'Tingzhen'. Lu's paintings display two distinct styles. Some of his works use brilliant colors in an almost inhibited presentation, while other are more flowing but with subdued ink and water colors.
