= Xu Xi (painter) =

Xu Xi (徐熙)
- Born: 9th century Jiangnan Circuit, Tang
- Died: Before 975; Southern Tang

Chinese name
- Chinese: 徐熙
Transcriptions
Standard Mandarin
- Hanyu Pinyin: Xú Xī
- Wade–Giles: Hsü^{2} Hsi^{1}

Xu Xi (Xú Xī, died before 975) was a Chinese painter in the Southern Tang kingdom during the Five Dynasties and Ten Kingdoms period.

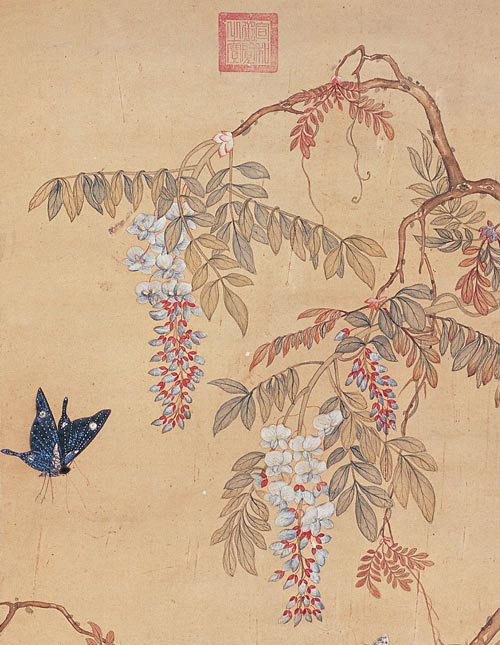
Butterfly and Chinese Wisteria Flowers, by Xu Xi

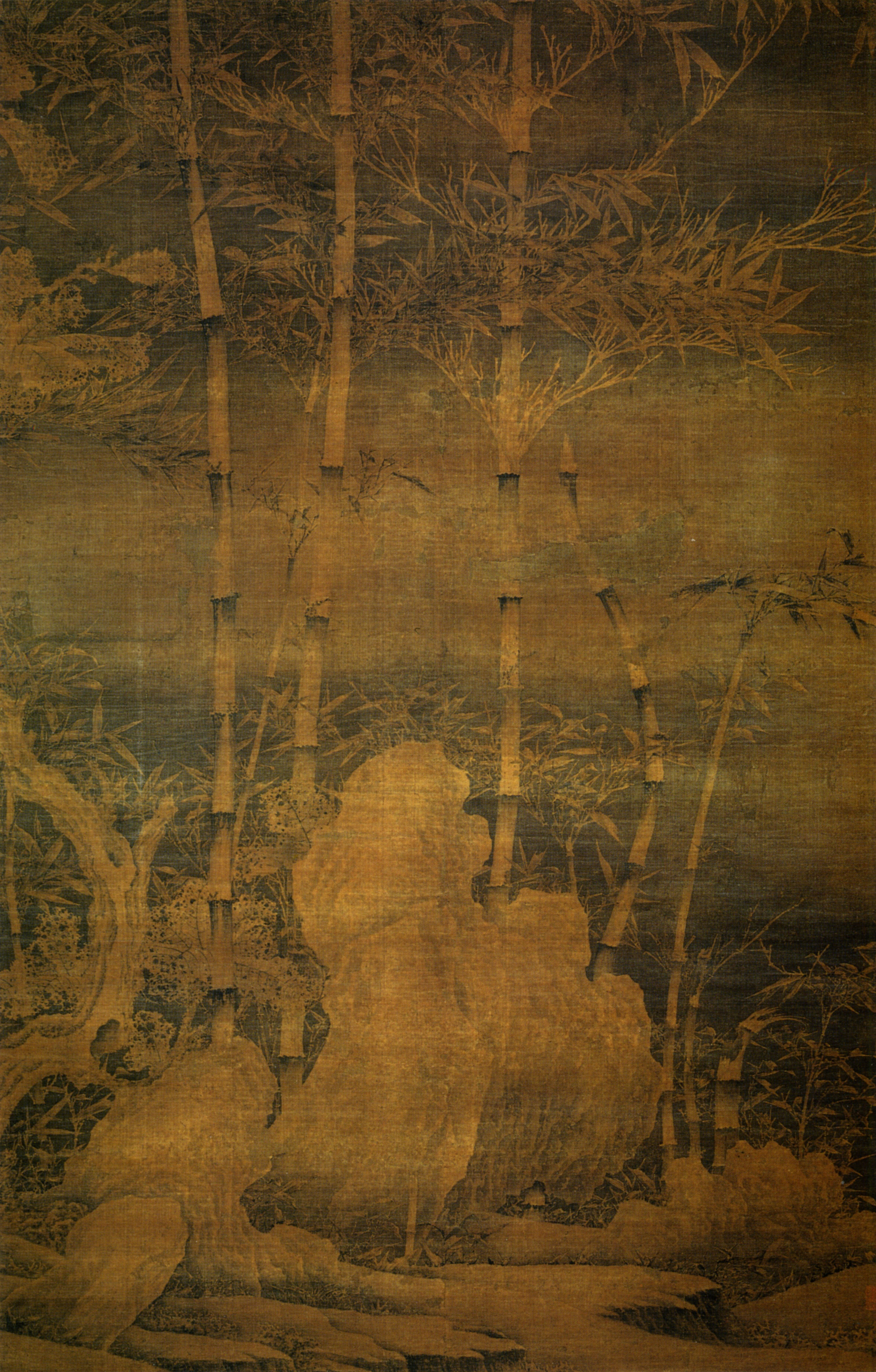
Snowy Bamboo 雪竹, attributed to Xu Xi。 Width 99.2 cm Height 151.1 cm. Shanghai Museum
