= Flat brush script =

Style for writing Chinese characters

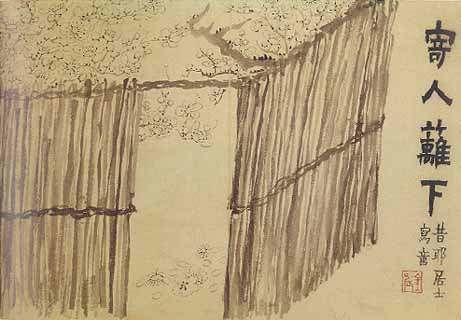
- Jin Nong's painting, which features his Flat Brush script

Chinese name
- Traditional Chinese: 漆書
- Simplified Chinese: 漆书
Transcriptions
Standard Mandarin
- Hanyu Pinyin: qī shū

Vietnamese name
- Vietnamese: Tất thư
- Chữ Hán: 漆書

The Flat Brush script (simplified Chinese: 漆书; traditional Chinese: 漆書; pinyin: qī shū) is a writing style in Chinese calligraphy that was created by Jin Nong (simplified Chinese: 金农; traditional Chinese: 金農) during the Qing dynasty. The writing style is a mix of the clerical script of the Han dynasty and the regular script of the Wei dynasty; these two writing styles make the Flat Brush script a unique writing style in Chinese calligraphy. The technique used to write in the flat brush script is very different from the other writing styles. It has to be written using a flat brush and not the regular East Asian writing brush.

== About the creator ==
Jin Nong was highly knowledgeable on Chinese calligraphy. His calligraphy was the best among the Eight Eccentrics of Yangzhou. Especially his clerical script and semi-cursive script, his works have unique and ingenious aesthetics. After the age of 50, he began to deviate from the norm and used his calligraphic knowledge to create the Flat Brush script. Jin Nong used a special ink that he made by himself, and he also used a special brush for the Flat Brush script.
