= Fang Wanyi =

Chinese artist (1732–1779)

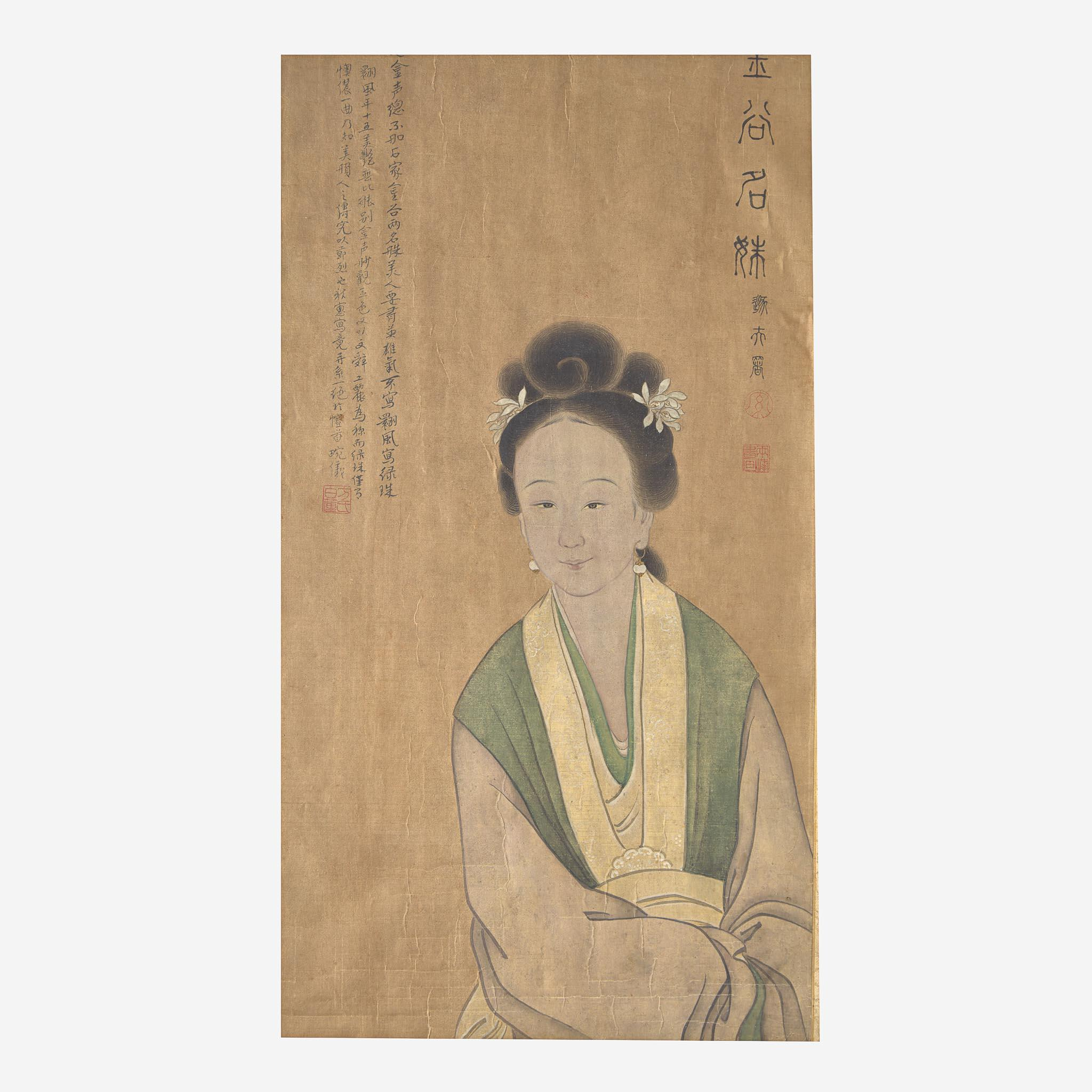
Portrait of a Meiren with Orchids in Her Hair (attributed to Fang Wanyi)

Fang Wanyi (方婉儀, 1732 – 1779) was a Chinese poet and painter. She married the painter Luo Ping in 1752, and painted several works both with him as well as alone. Many of these works were exhibited in Beijing during her lifetime, and became well known.

Her family was from Anhui, though she moved to Yangzhou when she and her husband married. Her father was named Baojian, and her grandfather, Fang Yuanying, had been a poet and politician.

Fang Wanyi was highly-educated. She studied poetry with the respected poet Shen Dacheng. She excelled in many skills, and gained renown as a painter, poet, and calligrapher. There are books of her work, including one titled Poems by Bailan. One of her collections of several works, Grieving a Young Maiden, was said to be so well-known that everyone in the city could say it by heart.

Around 1754, Fang Wanyi hosted a famous gathering of notable women poets, primarily members of the extended family of Luo Ping. Her guests included Luo Qiuying (Luo Ping's sister), Sun Jingyou (Luo Ping's sister-in-law), Xu Deyin, and Yuan Tang. The gathering was painted by the artist Guan Xining, in a painting entitled Reciting Poems in the Female Quarters on a Winter Day.

Fang Wanyi and Luo Ping created art together in their workshop, called The Thatched Hut of Fragrant Leaves. Their marriage appears to have been quite loving, and they wrote fondly of one another and praised one another's works. In their poetry, they often wrote lovingly, referring to one another by their 'style' names: Luo Ping was 'two peaks' and Fang Wanyi was 'white lotus'. Their friends and colleagues even wrote of the pair's love. Many years after Fang Wanyi's death, Luo Ping had a portrait painted; in the portrait, the elderly man holds a white lotus.
