= Gao Xiang (painter) =

Qing Chinese painter

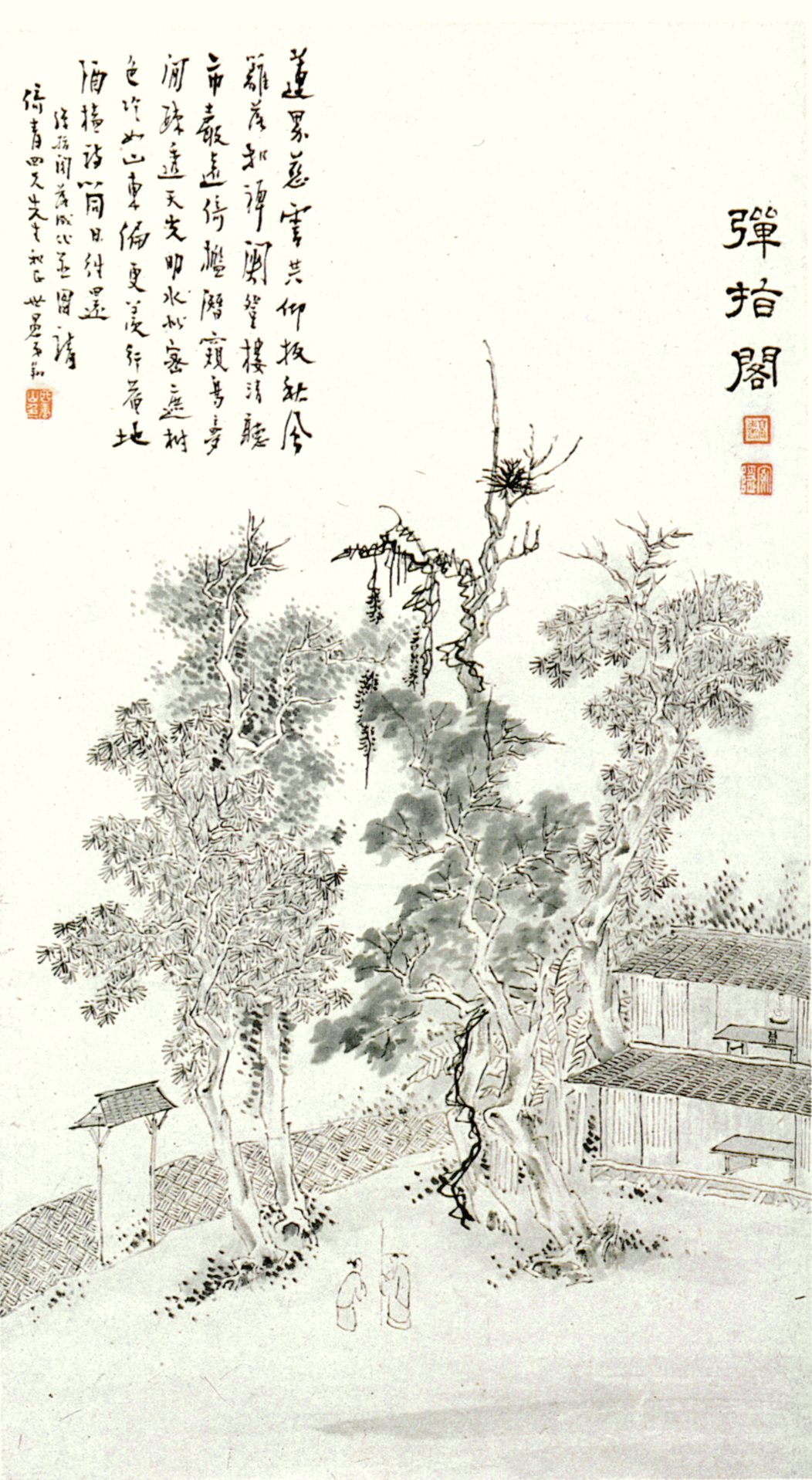
The Tanzhi Pavilion (弹指阁), Gao Xiang, Yangzhou Museum

Gao Xiang (Chinese: 高翔; 1688–1753) was a Qing Chinese painter, and one of the Eight Eccentrics of Yangzhou. He was born in Ganquan in Yangzhou prefecture.
