= Li Shan (painter) =

Chinese Qing dynasty painter

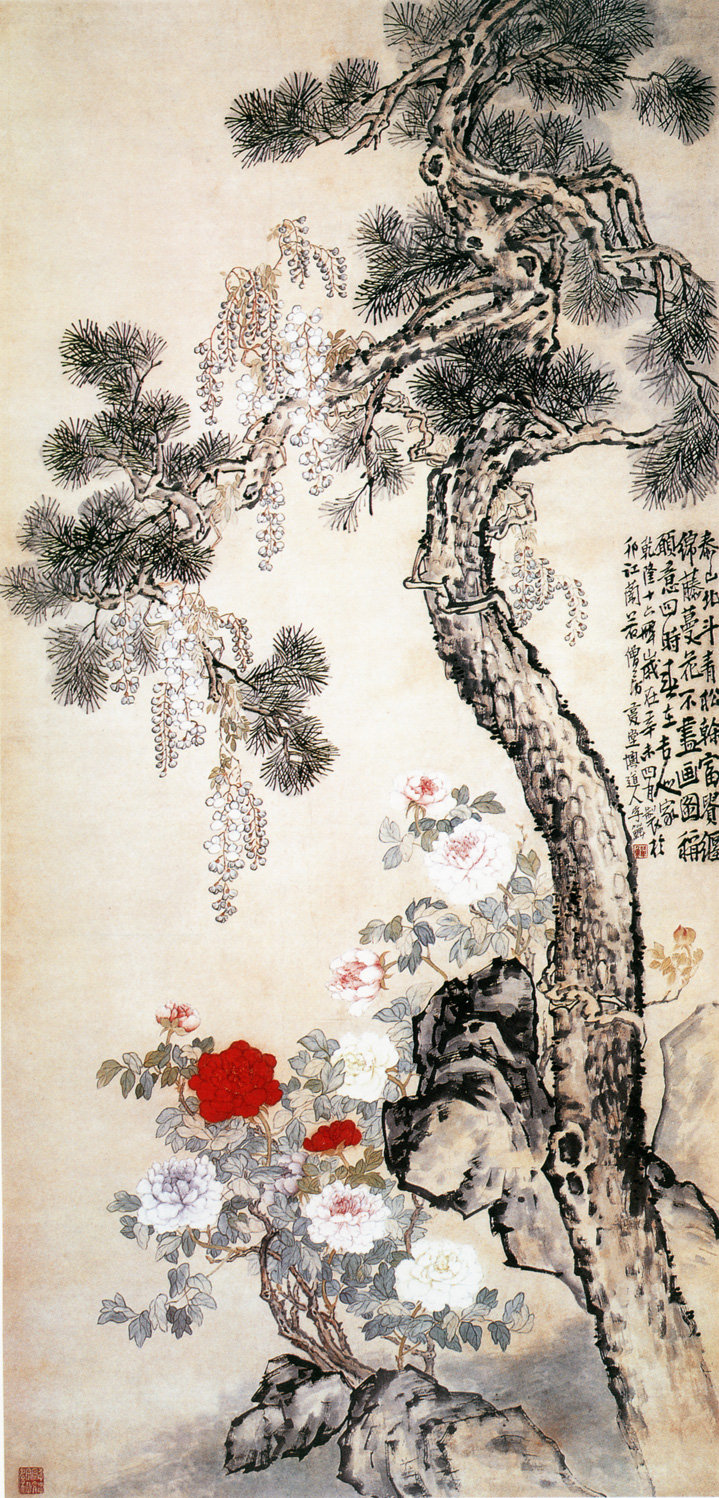
Pine Tree, Stone and Wisteria (松石紫藤图), Li Shan, Shanghai Museum

Li Shan (Chinese: 李鳝; c. 1686 – 1762) was a Chinese painter of the Qing dynasty, born in Jiangsu. He had an interest in painting at an early age and by 16 was a noteworthy painter. His paintings had an unrestricted quality and were influenced by Shitao. He was one of the Eight Eccentrics of Yangzhou.

Aside from painting he also served as a magistrate for a county in Shandong. Li Shan is also the name for two modern Chinese painters, one born in 1885 and the other in 1926.
