= Wang Shishen =

Wang Shishen (1686–1759) was a Chinese painter and calligrapher during the Qing Dynasty.

Wang was native of Xiuning in the Anhui province during the Qing dynasty. His style name was 'Jinren' and his sobriquets were 'Chaolin' and 'Xidong waishi'. He was born poor, but later made a good living as a painter and one of the Eight Eccentrics of Yangzhou. Despite that he still tended to be poor, but relatively happy, and devoted to painting research. Wang would become noted as one of the greatest Chinese painters of plum blossoms. He was also talented in painting human figures, calligraphy, and seal cutting.
