= Min Zhen =

Chinese painter and seal carver

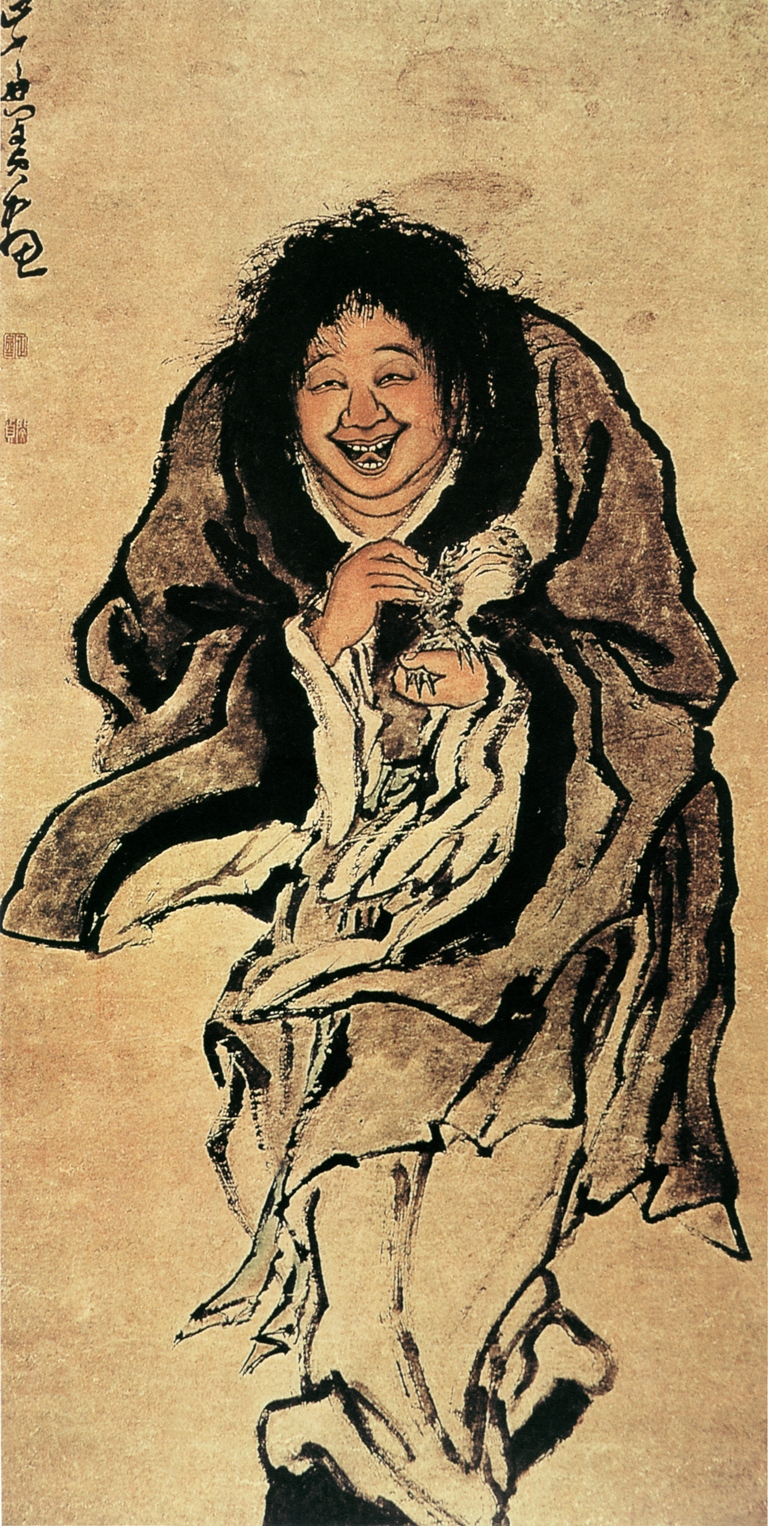
Toad Wizard (蛤蟆仙人图), Private Collection, Japan

Min Zhen (Chinese: 閔貞; 1730–?; courtesy name Zheng Zhai 正齋) was a Chinese painter and seal carver born in Nanchang, Jiangxi, who spent most of his life in Hubei. He was noted for painting human figures and doing occasional finger painting. He was orphaned at an early age and is sometimes associated with the Eight Eccentrics of Yangzhou.
