= Luo Ping =

Chinese painter

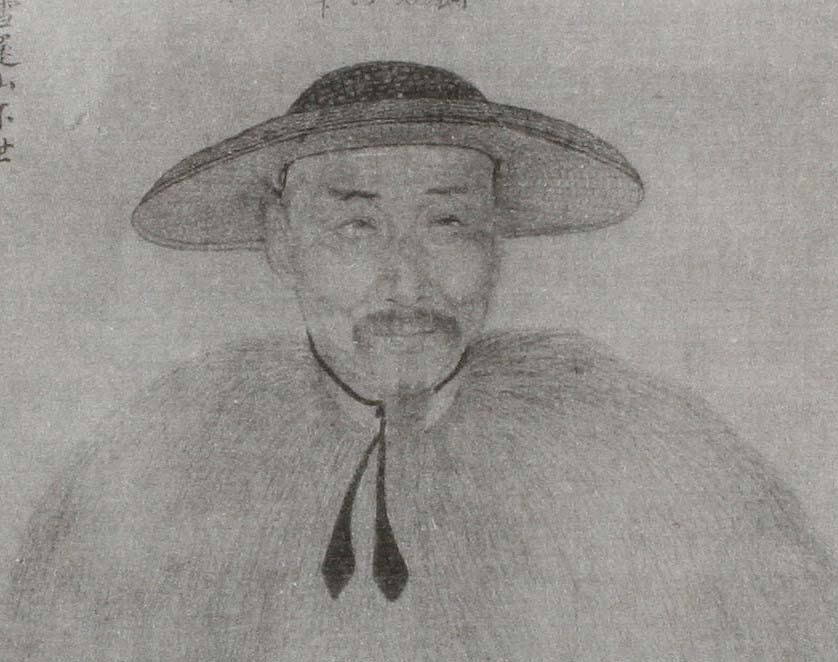
Auto portrait of Luo Ping

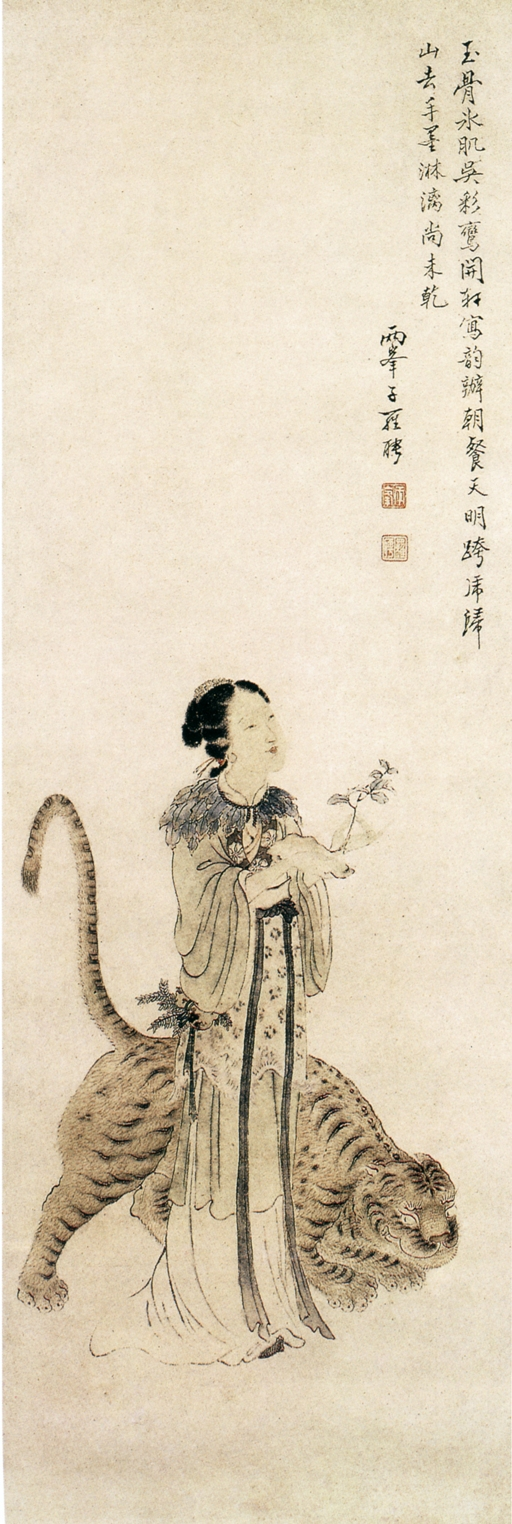
Mountain Witch (山鬼图), Luo Ping, Art School of Tsinghua University

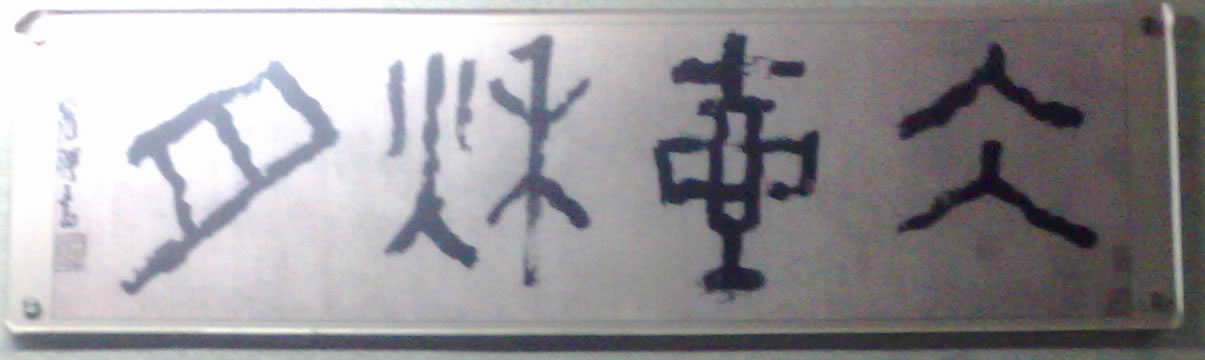
冰壶秋月, Luo Ping

Luo Ping (simplified Chinese: 罗聘; traditional Chinese: 羅聘; pinyin: Luó Pìn; Wade–Giles: Lo P'ing 1733 – 1799) was a Chinese painter of the Qing Dynasty who lived in Ganquan (甘泉; present-day Yangzhou, Jiangsu). His courtesy name was Dunfu (遯夫) and his pseudonyms were Liangfeng (兩峰; Liǎngfēng; lit. "Two Peaks") and Huazhisi Seng (花之寺僧; Huāzhisì Sēng; lit. "Monk of the Temple of Flowers"). He studied painting under Jin Nong and developed a unique personal style. He painted people, Buddhist images, plum with bamboo, flowers, and scenery paintings. He refused government service to live a life of poverty selling paintings. He was the youngest of the Eight Eccentrics of Yangzhou.

Luo Ping's life began with loss and sadness. His father died when Luo was just one year old, and his mother soon after. But from an early age the youth orphan was recognized as a talented poet and gained admission to the exclusive artistic circles of his home town, Yangzhou. At nineteen he married - for love—the poet and painter Fang Wanyi (方婉儀, 1732–1779). Their daughter and two sons (Yǔnshào, 允绍, and Yǔnzuǎn, 允缵) also went on to become artists. All painted plum blossoms, the family trade mark (罗家梅派).

Five years after his marriage Luo met the man who would change his life. This was the nationally renowned poet, artist and bon vivant Jin Nong (1687–1763). The 70-year-old master took a great liking to the talented young man, who was in turn inspired by the emotional and expressive art of his mentor. Luo also painted pictures for Jin Nong, who signed them with his own name and sold them. When, after 6 years of this close collaboration, Jin Nong died, Luo buried his teacher with as much reverence as if it were the funeral of his own father.

In the second half of his life, Luo often visited the capital, Beijing, where he caused a sensation in the fashionable cultural scene. On to a long painting scroll which he showed to everyone, he had painted ghosts and claimed to have seen such creatures with his own eyes: "Some expose teeth like melon seeds, and have fingers large as thighs." Luo died, highly esteemed, at the age of sixty-six. Throughout his life he saw himself as an austere Buddhist and signed his works with the name "Monk of the Temple of Flowers".
