= Bian Shoumin =

Qing dynasty painter

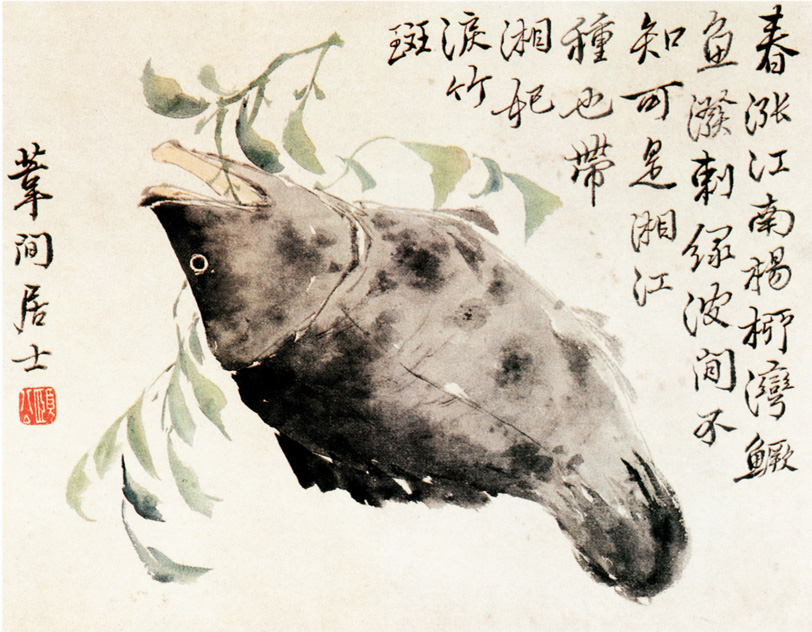
Mandarin Fish (杂画图 ), Bian Shoumin, Wuxi Antique Store

Bian Shoumin (Chinese: 边寿民; 1684–1752; original name Bian Weiqi [Chinese: 边维祺]), courtesy name as Yi-gong (颐公) or Jian-seng (漸僧), sobriquet as Weijian Laoren (苇间老人, or "Old man among Reeds"), is a famed Chinese painter in Qing Dynasty. A native Shanyang (now Huai'an), he was one of the "Eight Eccentrics of Yangzhou" and famous for painting wild geese, which earned him the name Bianyan (边雁, or "Bian geese").

== See also ==
- Geese in Chinese poetry
