= Gao Fenghan =

Chinese painter, poet and seal-carver

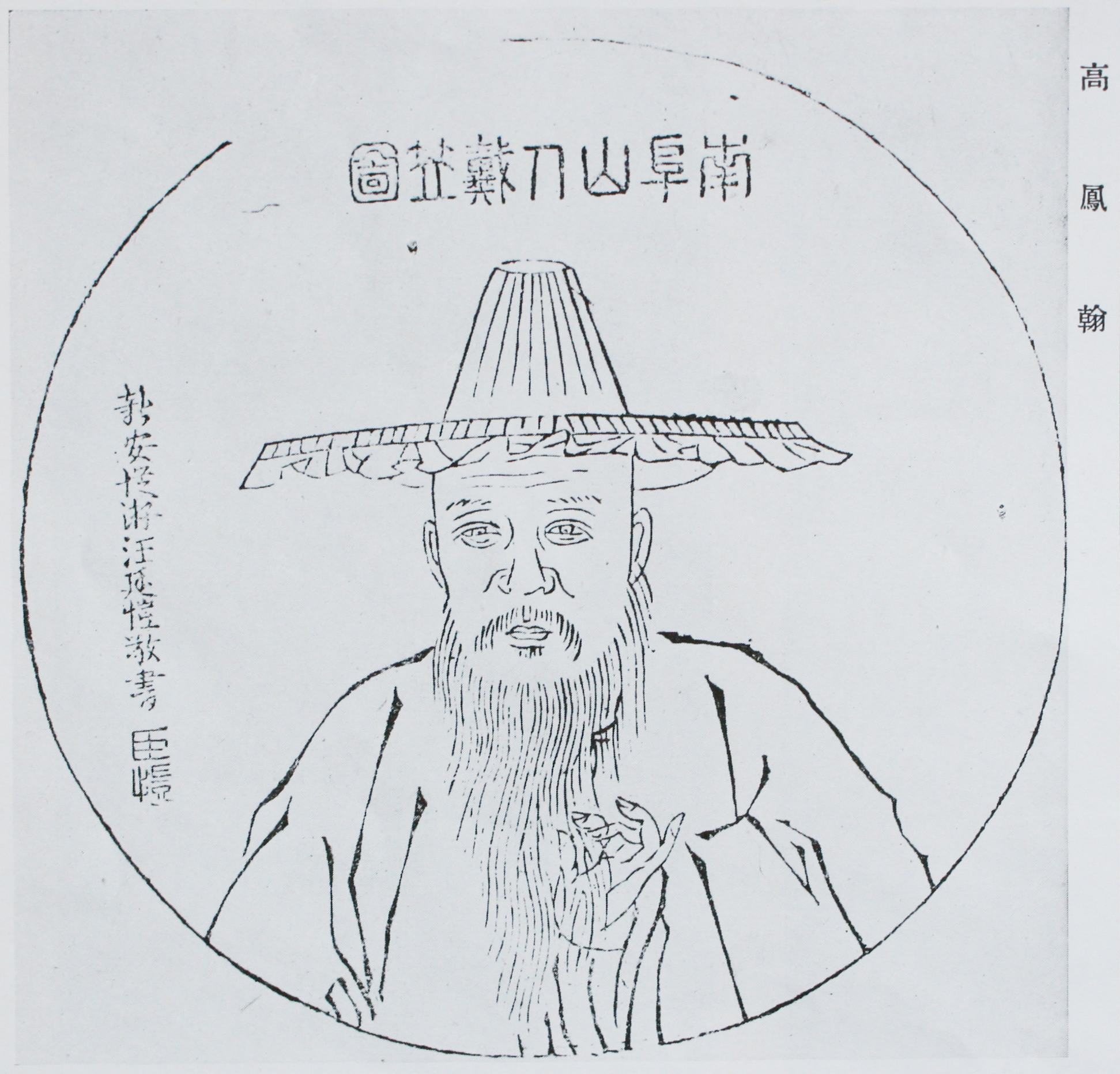
Gao Fenghan Portrait

Gāo Fènghàn (高鳳翰, 1683–1749) was born in Shandong to a minor bureaucrat. He was a painter, poet, and seal-carver, and he later became associated with the Yangzhou school of painters. These painters were known as eccentrics for their unorthodox style and preference for individualism. Gāo Fènghàn is not usually considered one of the eight Yangzhou eccentrics, but is associational. Like his father, he served a minor post in the bureaucracy, but this did not occur until 1739. In 1736, this job led to his imprisonment. The following year, injuries during his time in prison combined with arthritis disabled his right hand. After that he painted with his left. These paintings have since gained some renown among Chinese art collectors.

== Works ==
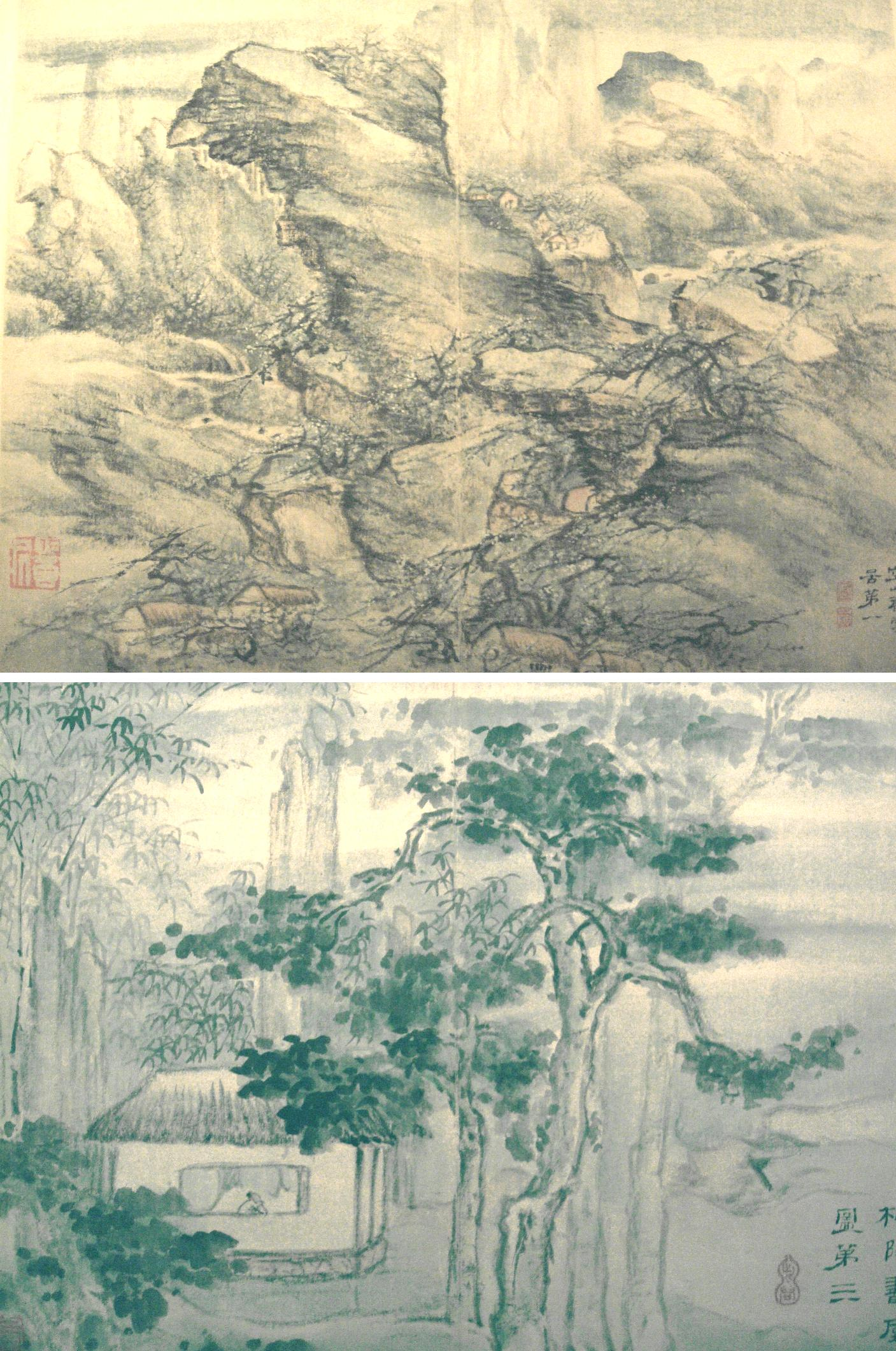
Gao Fenghan, (top): Fragrant Blossom Snow in the Desert Mountains, (bottom): Study in the Shade of the Wutong Tree, Museum of East Asian Art, Dahlem

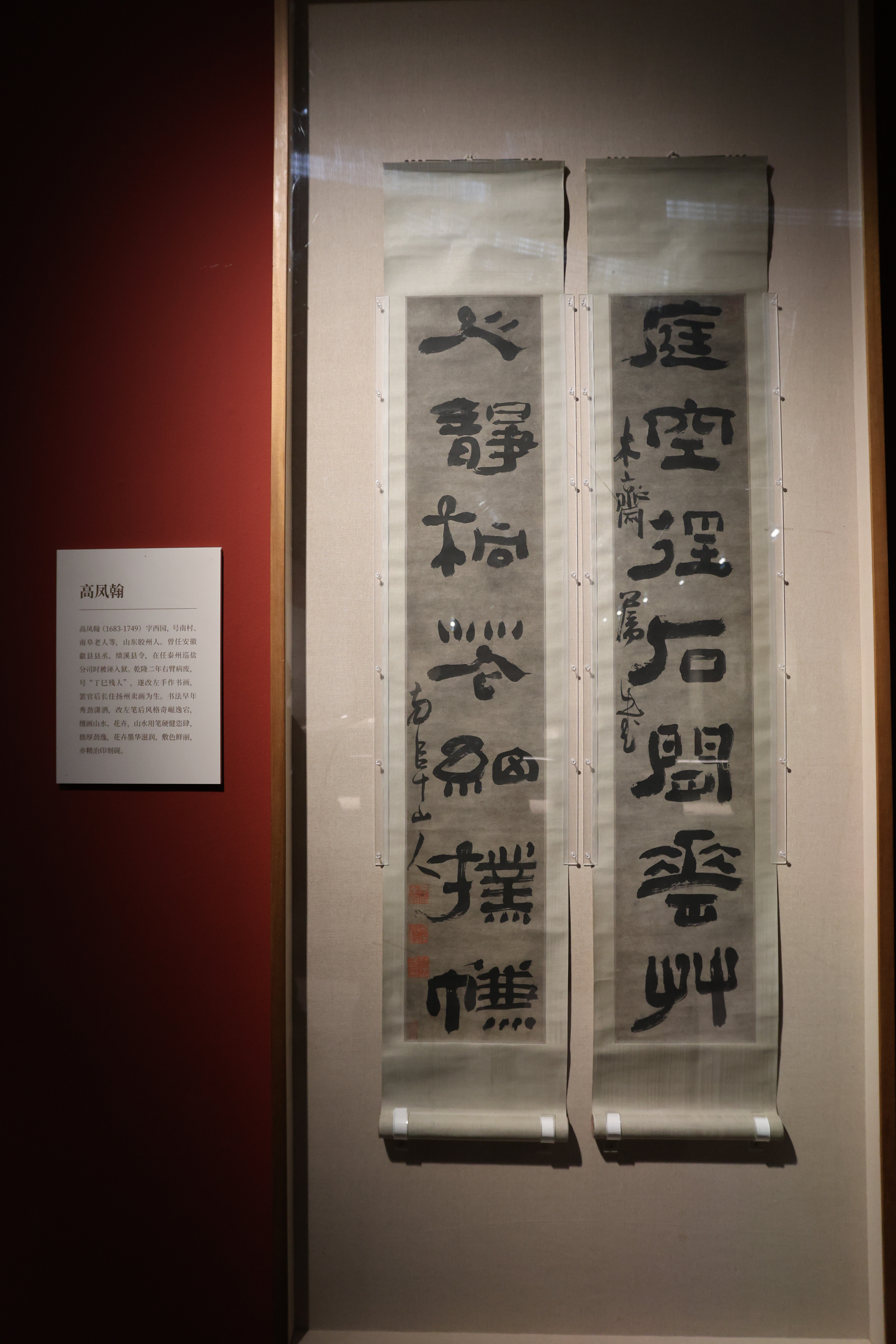
Calligraphy on Couplets by Gao Fenghan.

== Sources ==
- Chinese Paintings in the Ashmolean Museum Oxford(48) Oxford ISBN 1-85444-132-9
- Artnet Page on him
