= Zheng Xie =

Chinese painter (1693–1765)

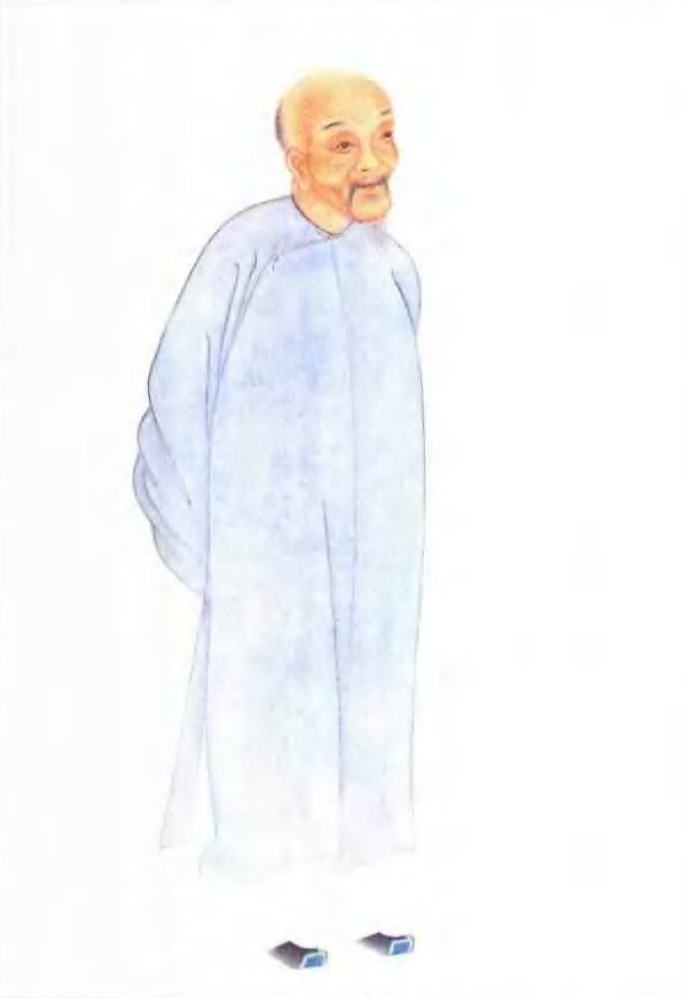
- Depiction of Zheng Xie by Ye Yanlan
- Born: November 22, 1693; Xinghua, Jiangsu, Qing China
- Died: January 22, 1766 (aged 72); Xinghua, Jiangsu, Qing China
- Occupations: Magistrate, painter, calligrapher
- Father: Zheng Li'an (鄭立庵)

Zheng Xie (Chinese: 鄭燮; pinyin: Zhèng Xiè), courtesy name Kerou (克柔), art name Banqiao (板橋) or Banqiao Daoren (板橋道人), commonly known as Zheng Banqiao (鄭板橋), was a Chinese official, painter and calligrapher of the Qing dynasty. He began life in poverty, but rose in the imperial examination system to become a magistrate in Shandong. However, after 12 years, he became critical of the life of an official as he refused to ingratiate himself with senior officials. When he was reportedly criticized for building a shelter for the poor, he resigned. After that, he expressed himself in art and became one of the Eight Eccentrics of Yangzhou. He was noted for his drawing of orchids, bamboo, and stones. In 1748 he briefly resumed an official career as "official calligrapher and painter" for the Qianlong Emperor.

Zheng was also a calligrapher who created a new calligraphy style influenced by his orchid drawings. Added to this, he had an interest in literature and poetry. He preferred to write about ordinary people in a natural style.

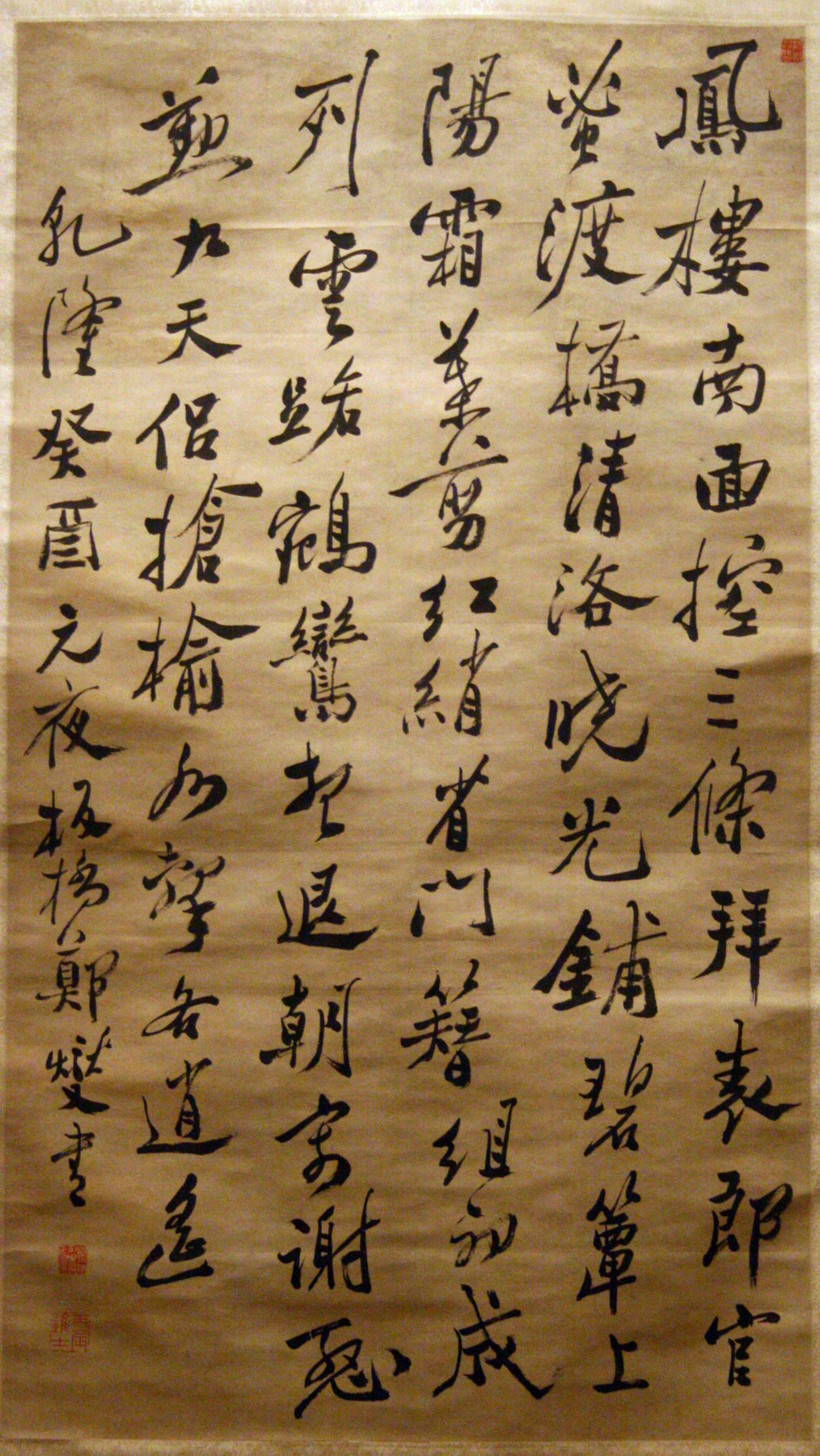
Calligraphical work of Zheng Xie, now collected in Shandong Museum

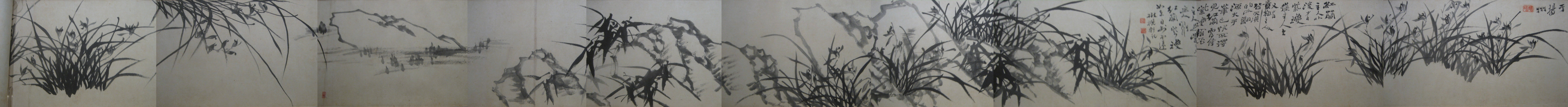
Orchids, Bamboo and Rocks, hand scroll by Zheng Xie, 1762, Shanghai Museum

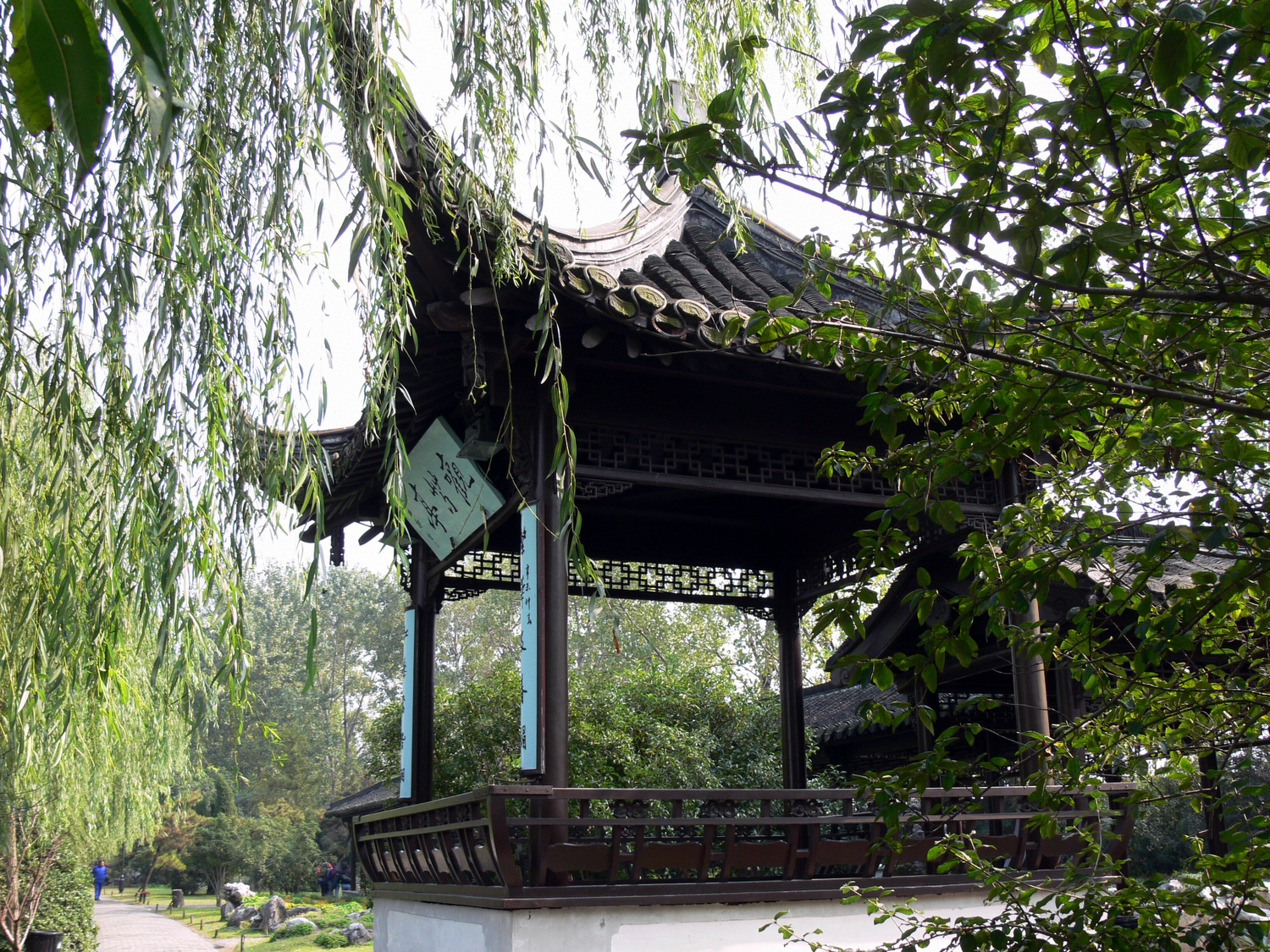
Herbaceous peony viewing pavilion with Zheng Xie calligraphed horizontal board in Thin West Lake of Yangzhou

== Homosexual tendencies ==
The poet is also known for his advocacy regarding male beauty, which he was in agreement with the opinion of Yuan Mei, who was an antagonist of his. An acquaintance of Yuan Mei reported the poet had "many male favorites (in Chinese called NanChong (男寵) or Waichong (外寵))".
