= Eight Eccentrics of Yangzhou =

Group of artists in China

Coordinates: 32.4008°N 119.4260°E

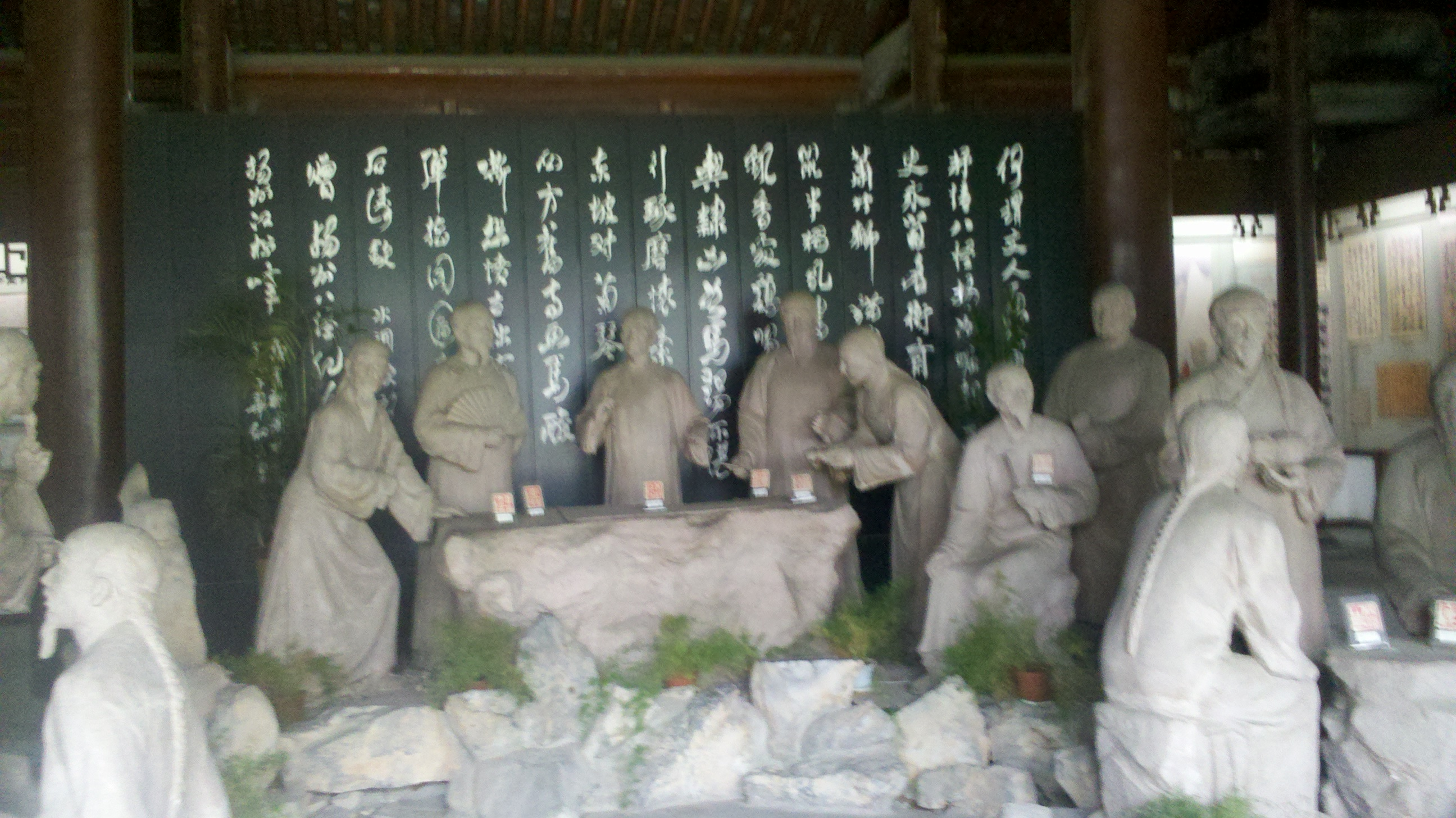
A sculpture in The "Eight Eccentrics of Yangzhou" Memorial Hall in Yangzhou depicting the eight eccentrics

Eight Eccentrics of Yangzhou (simplified Chinese: 扬州八怪; traditional Chinese: 揚州八怪; pinyin: Yángzhōu Bā Guài) refers to a group of eight Qing dynasty Chinese painters active in the eighteenth century who were known for rejecting the orthodox ideas about painting in favor of a style deemed expressive and individualist.

The term was also used because they each had strong personalities at variance with the conventions of their own time. Most of them were from impoverished or troubled backgrounds. Still, the term is, generally, more a statement about their artistic style than any social eccentricities.

The eight had an influence on and association with painters like Gao Fenghan, as well as several others.

== The Eight ==
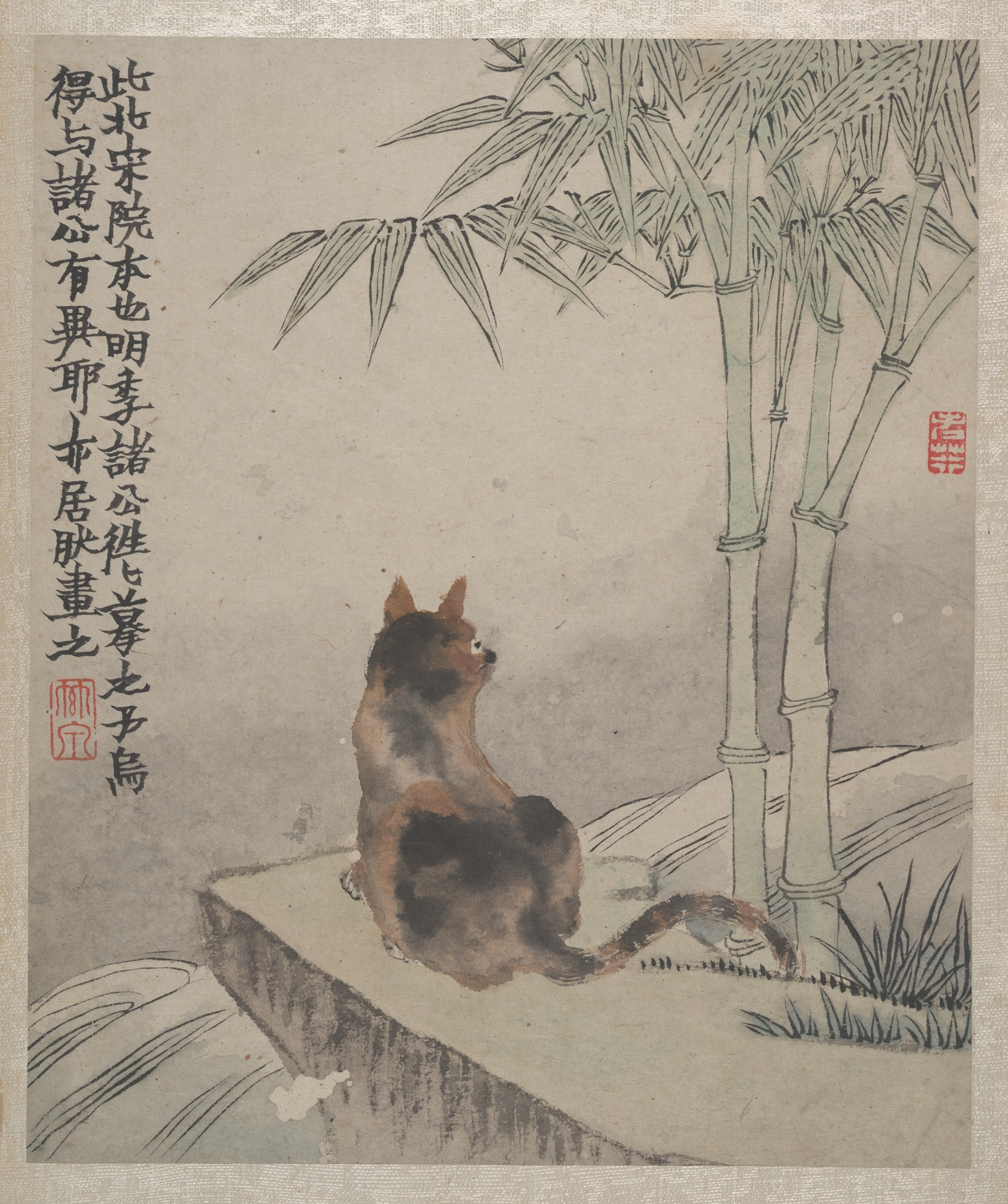
An ink and color on paper rendition of a cat and a bamboo plant by Jin Nong

The generally accepted list is:

- Wāng ShìShèn (汪士慎) (1686–1759)
- Huáng Shèn (黄慎) (1687–1768)
- Lĭ Shàn (李鱓/李鳝) (1686?–1756)
- Jīn Nóng (金农) (1687–1764)
- Luō Pìn (罗聘) (1733–1799)
- Gāo Xiáng (高翔) (1688–1753)
- Zhèng Xiè (郑燮), also known as Zhèng BănQiáo (郑板桥) (1693–1765)
- Lĭ FāngYīng (李方膺) (1696–1755)

Alternate lists include:

1. Huang Shen, Li Shan, Jin Nong, Zheng Xie, Li Fangying, Gao Fenghan, Bian Shoumin, Yang Fa
2. Wang Shishen, Huang Shen, Li Shan, Jin Nong, Luo Pin, Zheng Xie, Min Zhen, Gao Fenghan

== See also ==
- Xu Wei
- Yangzhou
