= Jin Nong =

Chinese calligrapher and painter

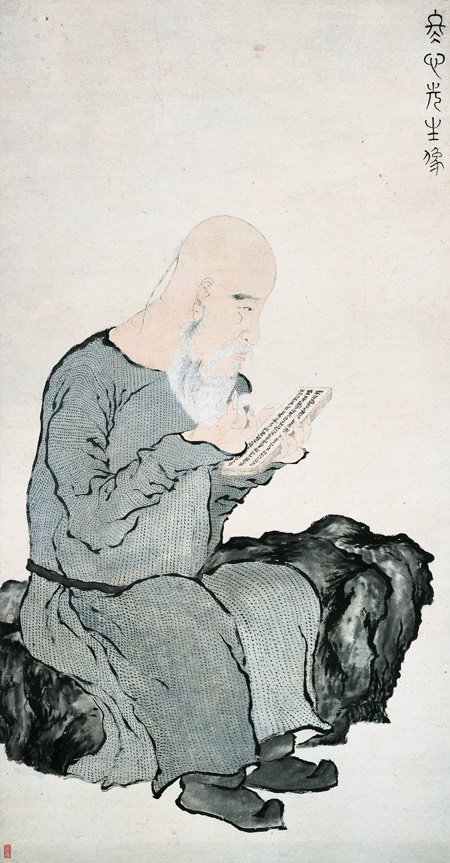
Portrait of Jin Nong by his protege, Luo Ping, in about 1762 or 1763 (possibly soon after Jin's death), portraying Jin as a "luohan", or Buddhist saint.

Born in 1687 in Hangzhou, Jin Nong (金農) became popular as a painter and calligrapher while living as a childless widower in Yangzhou in his sixties. His paintings of mei blossoms were in particular demand there. Heralded as one of The Eight Eccentrics of Yangzhou, Jin favored the amateur scholar style. A nonconformist, he generally painted more traditional images laden with symbolism (such as orchids, bamboo, chrysanthemums, and mei blossoms) and preserved his independence by selling works in an open market, rather than adopting an individual patron. Later styles included Buddhist imagery. However, Jin was the first artist in the Chinese tradition to paint a large number of self-portraits and did earn money through the patronage of wealthy individuals in Yangzhou who, in addition to buying works, were possible publishers for his numerous writings. Jin probably understood these contradictions as he argued that living off of painting should not be considered dishonorable.

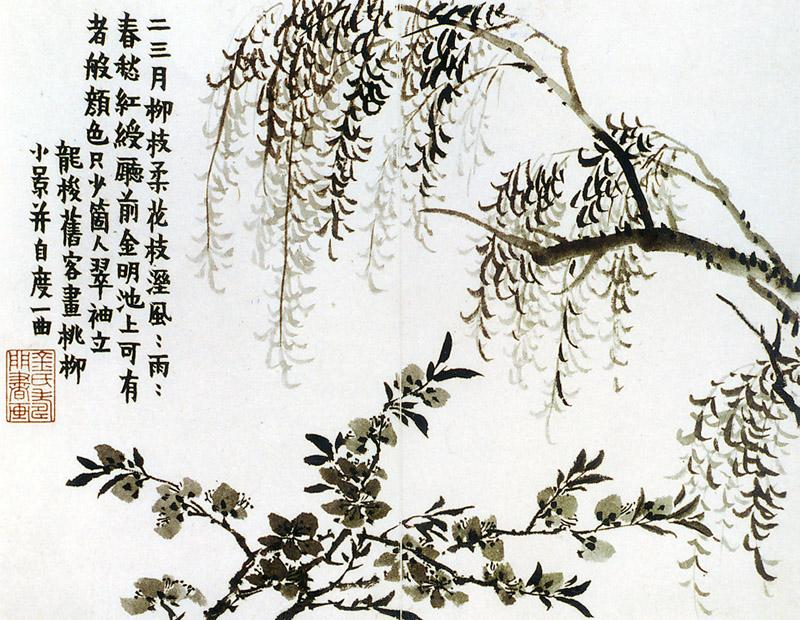
Willow Tree, (1754) ink on paper. 24.9 x 31.7 cm, Tianjin Municipal Art Museum.

Jin Nong also made money as a writer and general entrepreneur. He was known to travel with a number of disciple-servants who assisted in the production of ink stones and lanterns to which he would add a personal artistic touch. It was through the sale of these items that Jin achieved financial independence; his single, failed attempt to compete for office was in the year 1736. He became widely known for his writings, but when his health began to fail, painting became his principal source of income and he in fact acknowledged the use of ghost-painters as a way to increase production. One such understudy, Luo Ping (whose name is sometimes rendered "Lo Ping"), also edited some compilations of his works. He continued to write throughout this time and was a critic as well as a dealer of paintings. There is some confusion about Jin's year of death, but it was most likely 1763 or 1764.

He also had a reputation as a calligrapher creating a style he called "lacquer calligraphy."

== Sources ==
- Chinese Paintings in the Ashmolean Museum Oxford (76-77) Oxford ISBN 1-85444-132-9
- Cahill, James. The painter's practice. New York: Columbia University Press, 1994.
