= List of painters by name beginning with "W" =

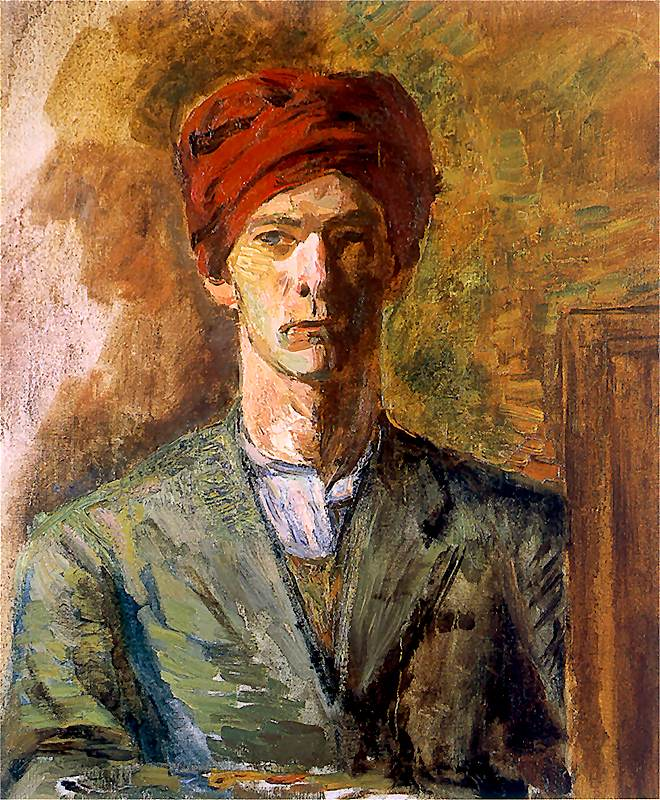
Zygmunt Waliszewski

Please add names of notable painters with a Wikipedia page, in precise English alphabetical order, using U.S. spelling conventions. Country and regional names refer to where painters worked for long periods, not to personal allegiances.

- Marion Wachtel (1875–1954), American painter
- Alfons Walde (1891–1958), Austrian painter and architect
- Hilda Annetta Walker (1877–1860), English painter and sculptor
- Karl Walser (1877–1943), Swiss painter, designer and illustrator
- Edward Wadsworth (1889–1949), English painter, engraver and camouflage designer
- Lionel Walden (1861–1933), American painter
- Ada Hill Walker (1879–1955), Scottish painter and scientific illustrator
- Zygmunt Waliszewski (1897–1936), Polish painter
- Ottilie Maclaren Wallace (1875–1947), Scottish sculptor
- Alfred Wallis (1855–1942), English artist and fisherman
- Henry Wallis (1830–1916), English painter, writer and collector
- Kathleen Walne (1915–2011), English watercolor painter
- Cecile Walton (1891–1956), Scottish painter, illustrator and sculptor
- Edward Arthur Walton (1860–1922), Scottish painter
- Wang Duo (王铎, 1592–1652), Chinese calligrapher, painter and poet
- Wang E (王谔, 1465–1545), Chinese imperial painter
- Wang Fu (王紱, 1362–1416), Chinese calligrapher, painter and poet
- Wang Guxiang (王谷祥, 1501–1568), Chinese painter
- Wang Hui (王翬, 1632–1717), Chinese painter
- Wang Jian (王鑒, 1598–1677), Chinese painter
- Wang Lü (王履, born 1332), Chinese painter, calligrapher and poet
- Wang Meng (王蒙, 1308–1385), Chinese painter
- Wang Mian (王冕, 1287–1359), Chinese painter and poet
- Wang Shimin (王時敏, 1592–1680), Chinese painter
- Wang Shishen (1686–1759), Chinese painter and calligrapher
- Victor Wang (born 1956), Chinese/American painter and professor
- Wang Wei (王維, 699–759), Chinese painter, poet and musician
- Wang Wu (王武, 1632–1690), Chinese painter and poet
- Wang Ximeng (王希孟, 1096–1119), Chinese court painter
- Wang Yi (王繹, born 1333), Chinese painter
- Wang Yuan (王淵, late 13th or 14th c.), Chinese painter
- Wang Yuanqi (王原祁, 1642–1715), Chinese painter
- Wang Zhenpeng (王振鵬, fl. 1280–1329), Chinese imperial painter
- Wang Zhongyu (王仲玉, fl. 14th c.), Chinese painter
- Walenty Wańkowicz (1799–1842), Polish painter
- Joan Warburton (1920–1996), English artist
- Everett Warner (1877–1963), American painter, print-maker and camouflage artist
- Laura Wheeler Waring (1887–1948), American artist and educator
- Andy Warhol (1928–1987), American artist and film director
- Watanabe Kazan (渡辺崋山, 1793–1841), Japanese painter, scholar and statesman
- Sadao Watanabe (渡辺禎雄, 1913–1996), Japanese print-maker
- Watanabe Shōtei (渡辺省亭, 1851–1918), Japanese nihonga painter
- Shōzaburō Watanabe (渡辺庄三郎, 1885–1962), Japanese print-maker
- John William Waterhouse (1849–1917), English painter
- Billie Waters (1896–1979), English artist
- Alison Watt (born 1965), Scottish painter
- George Fiddes Watt (1873–1960), Scottish painter and engraver
- James Cromar Watt (1862–1940), Scottish artist, architect and jeweler
- Jean Antoine Watteau (1684–1721), French painter
- George Frederic Watts (1817–1904), English painter and sculptor
- Henrik Weber (1818–1866), Hungarian painter
- Stokely Webster (1912–2001), American painter
- Jan Baptist Weenix (1621 – c. 1660), Dutch painter
- Gerda Wegener (1886–1940), Danish illustrator and painter
- Carel Weight (1908–1997), English painter
- Susan Weil (born 1930), American artist
- J. Alden Weir (1852–1919), American painter
- John Ellsworth Weis (1892–1962), American painter
- Samuel Washington Weis (1870–1956), American painter, sketcher and cotton broker
- Jerry Weiss (born 1959), American painter and writer
- Wojciech Weiss (1875–1950), Polish painter and draftsman
- Neil Welliver (1929–2005), American painter
- Margaret Bruce Wells (1909–1998), Scottish/English woodcut and lino-cut artist
- Albert Welti (1862–1912), Swiss painter and etcher
- Albert J. Welti (1894–1965), Swiss painter and writer
- Wen Boren (文伯仁, 1502–1575), Chinese painter
- Wen Jia (文嘉, 1501–1583), Chinese painter
- Wen Tong (文同, 1019–1079), Chinese painter
- Wen Zhengming (文徵明, 1470–1559), Chinese painter, calligrapher and poet
- Wen Zhenheng (文震亨, 1585–1645), Chinese painter, scholar and garden designer
- Kurt Wenner (living), American pavement artist
- Gustav Wentzel (1859–1927), Norwegian artist
- Marianne von Werefkin (1860–1938), Russian/German painter
- Adriaen van der Werff (1659–1722), Dutch painter
- Pieter van der Werff (1665–1722), Dutch painter
- Joseph Werner (1637–1710), Swiss painter and miniaturist
- Adolf Ulric Wertmüller (1751–1811), Swedish/American painter
- Tom Wesselmann (1931–2004), American painter, collagist and sculptor
- Benjamin West (1738–1820), American/English painter
- William Edward West (1788–1859), American painter
- Konstantin Westchilov (1877–1945), Russian/American painter
- Katerina Wilczynski (1894–1978), Polish/English artist
- Jacob Willemszoon de Wet (c. 1610 – 1675/1691), Dutch painter
- Rogier van der Weyden (1399–1464), Netherlandish painter
- Edith Grace Wheatley (1888–1970), English painter
- John Laviers Wheatley (1892–1955), Welsh painter
- Bessie Wheeler (born 1876), American painter
- James McNeill Whistler (1834–1903), American/English artist
- Brett Whiteley (1939–1992), Australian artist
- Félix Bódog Widder (1874–1939), Hungarian painter and graphic designer
- Charmion von Wiegand (1896–1983), American painter, writer and critic
- Hans Beat Wieland (1867–1945), Swiss painter
- Cornelis Claesz van Wieringen (1576–1633), Dutch painter
- Antoine Wiertz (1806–1865), Belgian painter and sculptor
- Bjørn Wiinblad (1918–2006), Danish painter, designer and ceramicist
- Thomas Wijck (1616–1677), Dutch painter
- Jan Wijnants (1632–1684), Dutch painter
- Jerry Wilkerson (1943–2007), American artist
- David Wilkie (1785–1841), Scottish/English painter
- Abraham Willaerts (1603–1669), Dutch painter
- Adam Willaerts (1577–1664), Dutch painter
- Adolphe Willette (1857–1926), French painter, caricaturist and lithographer
- Bedwyr Williams (born 1974), Welsh artist and comedian
- Charles Williams (born 1965), English painter and teacher
- Christopher Williams (1873–1934), Welsh artist
- David Dougal Williams (1888–1944), English/Scottish artist and teacher
- Hugh William Williams (1773–1829), Scottish painter
- Ivor Williams (1908–1982), Welsh artist
- Kyffin Williams (1918–2006), Welsh painter
- Neil Williams (1934–1988), American painter
- Penry Williams (1802–1885), Welsh/Italian painter
- Harold Sandys Williamson (1892–1978), English painter
- Carel Willink (1900–1983), Dutch painter
- Thornton Willis (born 1936), American painter and teacher
- Jens Ferdinand Willumsen (1863–1958), Danish painter, sculptor and architect
- Donald Roller Wilson (born 1938), American painter
- Richard Wilson (1713–1782), Welsh painter
- Franz Xaver Winterhalter (1805–1873), German painter and lithographer
- Sylvia Wishart (1936–2008), Scottish painter
- Stanisław Witkiewicz (1855–1915), Polish painter, theorist and architect
- Stanisław Ignacy Witkiewicz (1885–1939) Polish painter, writer and photographer
- Emanuel de Witte (1617–1692), Dutch painter
- Caspar van Wittel (1653–1736), Dutch/Italian painter and draftsman
- Uwe Wittwer (born 1954), Swiss artist
- Emanuel Witz (1717–1797), Swiss painter
- Konrad Witz (1410–1446), Swiss painter
- Henry Otto Wix (1866–1922), German/American painter
- David Wojnarowicz (1954–1992), Polish painter, illustrator and print-maker
- Kazimierz Wojniakowski (1772–1812), Polish painter, illustrator and Freemason
- Witold Wojtkiewicz (1879–1909), Polish painter, illustrator and print-maker
- Caspar Wolf (1735–1783), Swiss painter
- Adolf Wölfli (1864–1930), Swiss artist
- John Wollaston (fl. 1742–1775), English/American painter
- John Wonnacott (born 1940), English painter
- Toss Woollaston (1910–1998), New Zealand painter
- Christopher Wood (1901–1930), English painter
- Grant Wood (1891–1942), American painter
- Leona Wood (1921–2008), American painter, dancer and writer
- Ursula Wood (1868–1925), English artist and illustrator
- Charles H. Woodbury (1864–1940), American painter
- William Woodward (1859–1939), American artist and educator
- Henry Woods (1846–1921), English painter and illustrator
- Thomas Frederick Worrall (1872–1957), English painter and politician
- Troels Wörsel (born 1950), Danish painter
- Philips Wouwerman (1619–1668), Dutch painter
- Cindy Wright (born 1972), Belgian painter
- John Michael Wright (1617–1694), Scottish/English painter
- Joseph Wright of Derby (1734–1797), English painter
- Andrzej Wróblewski (1927–1957), Polish painter
- Peter Wtewael (1596–1660), Dutch painter
- JoWOnder (living), English painter, animator and writer
- Wu Bin (吳彬, fl. late 16th, early 17th century), Chinese painter and Buddhist monk
- Wu Changshuo (吳昌碩, 1844–1927), Chinese painter, calligrapher and seal artist
- Wu Daozi (吳道子, 680 – c. 760), Chinese painter
- Wu Guanzhong (吳冠中, 1919–2010), Chinese painter
- Wu Hong (吳宏, fl. between 17th and 19th centuries), Chinese painter and ink-bamboo artist
- Wu Li (吳歷, 1632–1718), Chinese painter, calligrapher and poet
- Wu Shixian (吳石仙, died c. 1916), Chinese painter
- Wu Wei (吳偉, 1459–1508), Chinese painter
- Wu Zhen (吳鎮, 1280–1354), Chinese painter
- Wu Zuoren (吴作人, 1908–1997), Chinese painter
- Paul Wunderlich (1927–2010), German painter, sculptor and graphic artist
- Wuzhun Shifan (無準師範, 1178–1249), Chinese painter, calligrapher and Zen Buddhist monk
- Nathan Wyburn (born 1989), Welsh artist and media personality
- Jan Wyck (1652–1700), Dutch painter
- Leon Wyczółkowski (1852–1936), Polish painter and academy professor
- Andrew Wyeth (1917–2009), American visual artist
- Henriette Wyeth (1907–1997), American painter
- Jamie Wyeth (born 1946), American painter
- N. C. Wyeth (1882–1945), American artist and illustrator
- George Wyllie (1921–2012), Scottish artist and sculptor
- Stanisław Wyspiański (1869–1907), Polish painter, interior designer and poet
- Juliette Wytsman (1866–1925), Belgian painter
- Rodolphe Wytsman (1860–1927), Belgian painter
