= Ye Huacheng =

Ye Huacheng (born in 1800, or 1812 ?), also known as Donggu, (Note: The pronunciation of "Dong" in "Donggu" is the same of that of "East" in Mandarin.) was a native of Haicheng County in Fujian Province, Qing Dynasty, and later moved to Jingshan in Xiamen. In 1853 (the 15th year of the Daoguang Emperor's reign), he passed the imperial examination and became a juren. He was active during the reigns of the Daoguang and Xianfeng emperors, and was a close friend of Lu Shiyi. He was also a disciple of Guo Shangxian and Zhou Kai, and was deeply influenced by their mainstream calligraphy principles of promoting copybooks. Later, he was recommended by Zhou Kai to teach at the "Jigu Book House" established by Lin Benyuan in Banqiao. Along with Lu Shiyi and Xie Guanqiao, he was known as one of the "Three Masters of the Lin Family" among the calligraphers and painters of that time. Of the three masters, he spent the shortest time in Taiwan. Because of his calligraphy skills, he was also known as one of the "Two Masters of the East and West" along with Lu Shiyi (Xicun), (Note: The pronunciation of "Xi" in "Xicun" is the same of that of "West" in Mandarin.) and was part of a group of four calligraphers known as the "Four Masters of the East, West, South, and North" along with Chen Nanjin (Note: The pronunciation of "Nan" in "Nanjin" is the same of that of "South" in Mandarin.) and Lin Guohua (Shubei (Note: The pronunciation of "bei" in "Shubei" is the same of that of "North" in Mandarin.)).

Ye Huacheng was skilled in both calligraphy and painting. There is a belief that he was skilled in the clerical script, but most of his surviving works are in the running, and there are no surviving examples of his clerical script works. He once copied Yan Zhenqing's "Draft of a Requiem to My Nephew," " Draft of a Requiem to My Uncle," and "On Seating Arrangement" in running style, and introduced Yan's running-cursive script style to northern Taiwan. Because Xie Guanqiao also learned Yan's calligraphy during the same period, after the reign of Emperor Daoguang, most scholars in Taiwan commonly learned Yan's running-cursive script, which became a trend at that time and had an impact on the cultural development of northern Taiwan.

In terms of painting, Ye Huacheng was skilled in landscape painting and his style was influenced by the Four Wangs of the early Qing dynasty, which included Wang Shimin, Wang Jian, Wang Hui, and Wang Yuanqi. However, due to the small number of surviving works that he left in Taiwan, his reputation was not as high as that of Lu Shiyi and Xie Guanqiao among the "Three Masters of the Lin Family".

== Works ==
National Museum of History Collection: "Landscape Painting on a Folding Fan"

National Taiwan Museum of Fine Arts Collection: "Ink Painting", "An Excerpt of 'Rphapsody of Wei Capital' by Zuo Si in Running Script (scroll)".

Kaohsiung Museum of Fine Arts Collection: "Hanging Scroll in Running Script"
