= Wu Li =

Chinese painter and Jesuit priest (1632–1718)

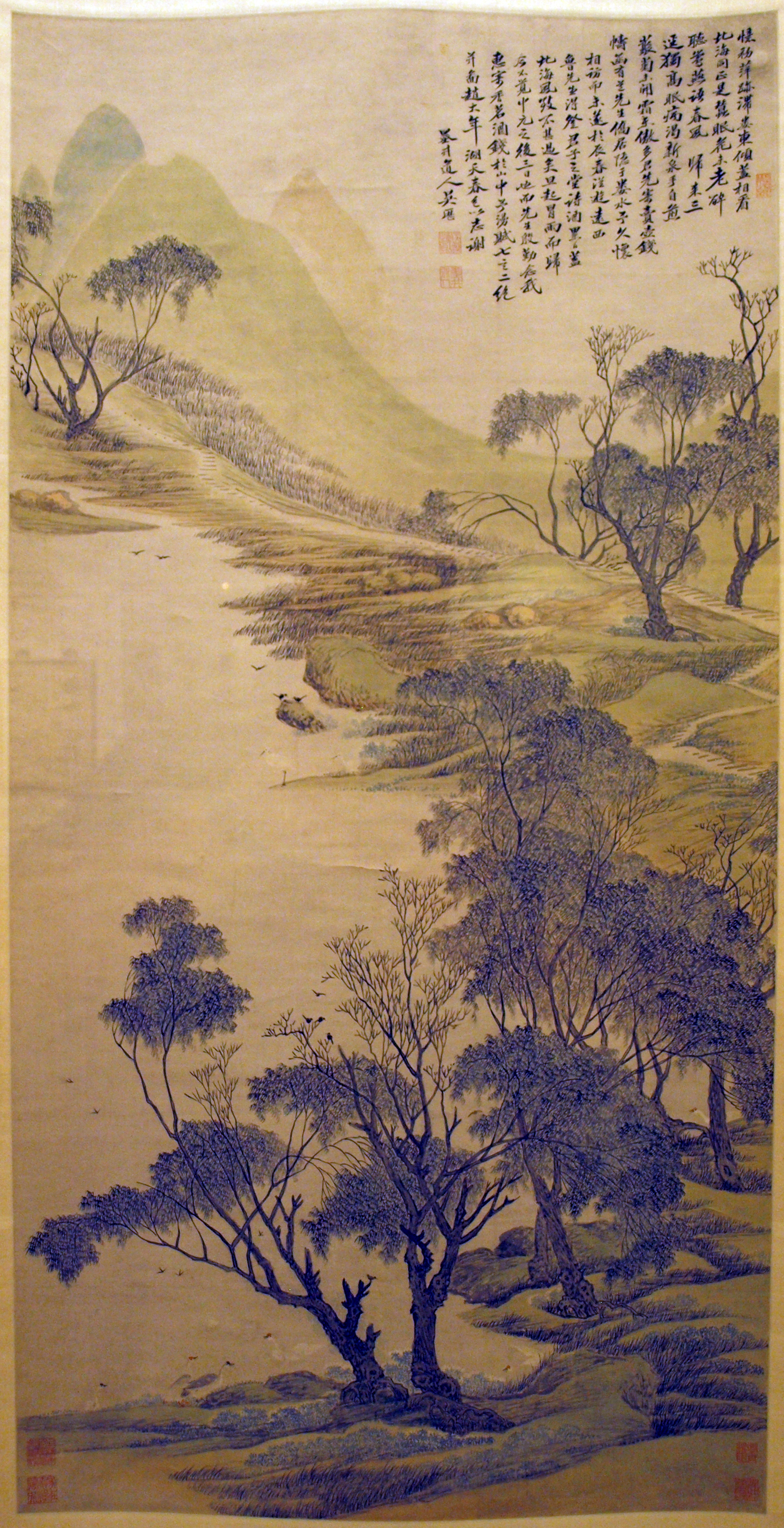
Hanging scroll painting by Wu Li: Spring Comes to the Lake, on display at the Shanghai Museum

Wu Li, SJ (simplified Chinese: 吴历; traditional Chinese: 吳歷; pinyin: Wú Lì); ca. 1632-1718 was a Chinese landscape painter, Christian poet, calligrapher and Jesuit missionary priest from Jiangsu who lived during the Qing Dynasty (1644–1912).

Wu converted to the Catholic Church in China, and, after being widowed, joined the Society of Jesus. In 1688, after seven years of education at St. Paul's College, Macau, Wu was ordained at Nanjing as one of the three first Chinese Jesuit priests, taking the name Simon-Xavier a Cunha. He spent the remaining 30 years of his life serving tirelessly as priest in rural villages.

== Life ==
Wu was born in Changzhou in the Jiangsu province of China. His style name was 'Yu Shan' and his sobriquet was 'Mojing Daoren'. Wu learned poetry from Qian Qianyi. He was taught painting by Wang Shimin and Wang Jian, and was influenced by the painters Huang Gongwang and Wang Meng. His landscapes utilized dry brush strokes and light colors. His distinctive style elevated him to where he is now identified as one of the Six Masters of the early Qing period.

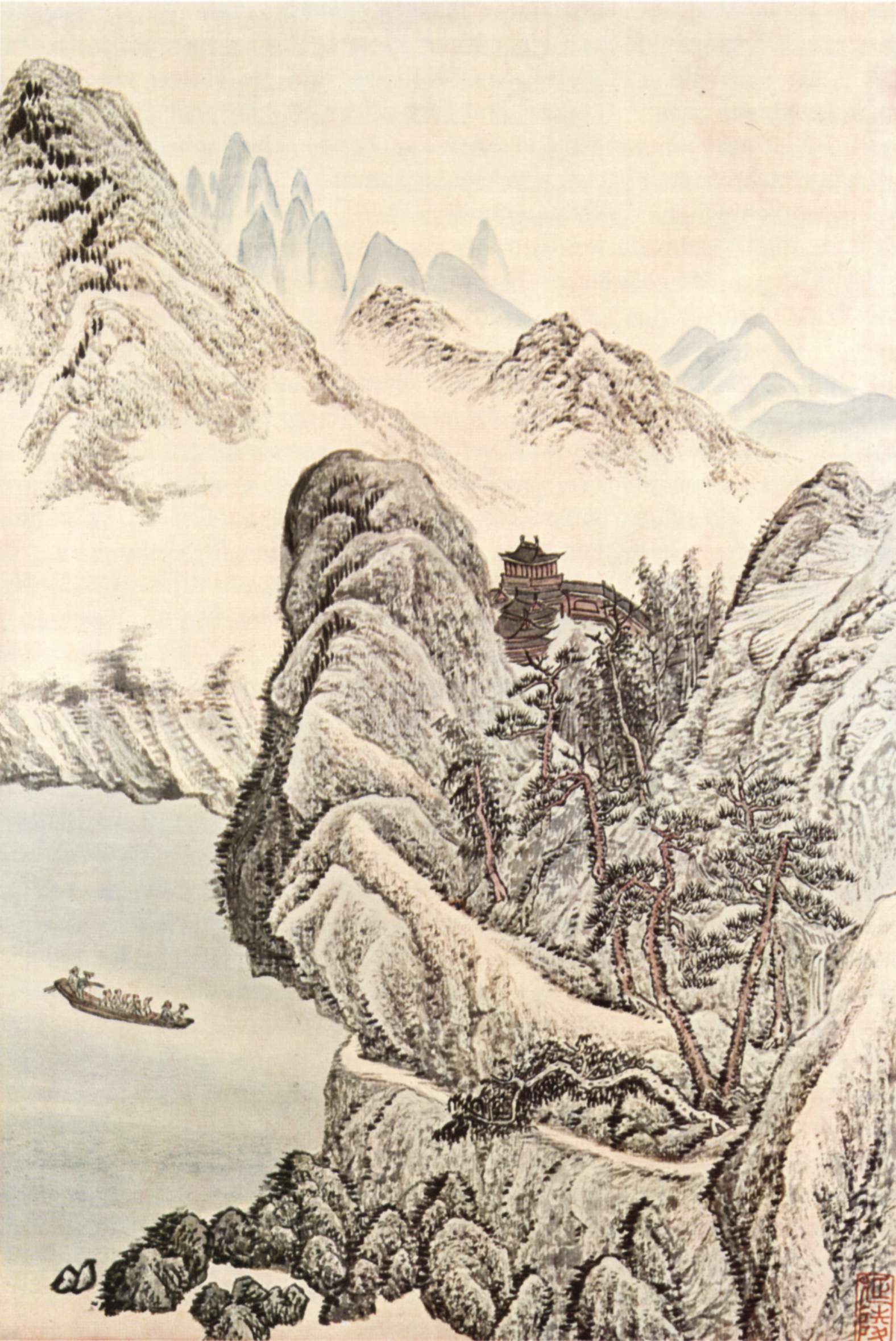
Wu Li, Boat Trip on the River Underneath a Buddhist Temple

The dramatic decline and fall of the Ming Dynasty and the coming to power of the Manchu Qing Dynasty caused the crisis of a number of intellectuals, who looked for new directions for them and for the country. The philosophical and ethical teaching of the Jesuits' learned missionaries, based out of Macau, appealed to them. Several literati, steeped in Confucianism and Buddhism, sought widening religious horizons, accepting the 'Western Teaching'. Conversion to Christianity was for them the arrival point of a spiritual and personal journey toward religious fulfillment. The converts saw in the Christian teaching an opportunity to revitalize, morally and scientifically, a country in crisis.

Wu often went to the Xing Fu Buddhist convent in Suzhou during his middle-age years and was a close friend of monk Mo Yong, but from 1675 on he was inclined toward Roman Catholicism through his contact with Jesuit missionaries Lu Rima (Franciscus de Rougemont), Bai Yingli (Phillippe Couplet), and others. He was converted and baptized (by?) Ximan Sawulue (Simon Xaverius). In 1681 Couplet was recalled to Europe. Wu intended to go with him, but his plans did not materialize when they reached Macau. Wu remained in Macau for five months and returned to his hometown in the summer of 1682. He returned to Macau in the winter and joined the Society of Jesus.

At the age of 50, Wu Li's life took a dramatic turn. After the death of his wife and his masters, obeying to an internal quest for spiritual excellence, fascinated by the Jesuit art and architecture, and after having been a Catholic for seven years, he chose to join the Jesuit priesthood and entered St. Paul's College, Macau to pursue both the 'heavenly learning' and the Roman Catholic priesthood. There he strenuously searched 'the Western Lantern', struggling to learn a new language (Ecclesiastical Latin) and to acquire a new religious dimension, on the lines of the 'Spiritual Exercises', as a son of Saint Ignatius of Loyola.

He was ordained a priest on 1 August 1688 in Nanjing by Chinese bishop Luo Wenzao. His first pastoral assignment was in Shanghai. In 1691, he was put in charge of the religious affairs of the Jiading Catholic Church.

Wu Li devoted himself to the new faith and to ministry. Often disguised as a peasant or fisherman, he traveled for thirty years from village to village to evangelize. Although he had the opportunity to become a court painter, as did his friend Wang Hui, Wu Li worked in the Jiangsu countryside as an itinerant missionary priest, where he reported encountering difficulties and limited results. He ministered to peasants and described his work in terms of devotion to their spiritual welfare. The Chinese poetry he continued to write as a priest addresses themes of his faith, as well as periods of contentment and frustration.

Wu Li in no way rejected his Chinese identity, as shown by the fact that his paintings maintained an autochthonous style, and he signed them with his Chinese name. The extent of Western influence in his figurative art, if any, has been discussed by scholars, with no clear consensus reached.

Scholars, however, agree on the exceptionally important value of Wu Li's personal experience. Wu Li was a man of rare qualities: a fine Chinese intellectual, a remarkable artist, a Jesuit, a missionary and a priest totally devoted to his flock.

Wu died at age 86 after serving 30 years as a priest. He composed many poems reflecting his own preaching career and religious feelings, which are collected in an anthology, San Yi Ji. His sermons from 15 August 1696 to 25 December 1697 and other religious activities were compiled by Zhao Lun, a convert in Jiading, in a book, Kou Duo (Record of Word and Deeds), the first collection of sermons by a Chinese priest.
