= Wang Yi (disambiguation) =

Wang Yi (王毅; born 1953) is a Chinese diplomat and politician.

Wang Yi may also refer to:

== People named Wang Yi (王沂) ==
- Wang Yi (王沂), one of the compilers of the History of Song
- Wang Yi (Ming dynasty) (王沂; born 1443), politician

== People named Wang Yi (王毅) ==
- Wang Yi (water polo) (王毅; born 1987), water polo player
- Wang Yi (footballer, born 1990) (王毅; born 1990), Chinese football (soccer) player
- Denny Wang (王毅; born 1998), Chinese football (soccer) player whose Chinese name is Wang Yi

== People named Wang Yi (王怡) ==
- Wang Yi (pastor) (王怡; born 1973), Chinese Calvinist pastor
- Wang Yi (volleyball) (王怡; born 1973), Olympic volleyball player

== Other people ==
- Wang Yi (Xin dynasty) (王邑), commander in the Battle of Kunyang, 23 CE
- Wang Yi (librarian) (王逸), Han dynasty librarian, minor poet, and anthologist
- Wang Yi (wife of Zhao Ang) (王異), wife of Eastern Han dynasty official Zhao Ang, joined her husband in resisting the warlord Ma Chao
- Wang Yi (painter) (王繹; born 1330), Yuan dynasty painter
- Wang Yi (dissident) (王译; born 1963/64), human rights activist
- Wang Yi (figure skater) (王一; born 1992), figure skater
- Wang Yi (王弋), older brother of famous Chinese singer Faye Wong

== Companies ==
- NetEase (網易; pinyin: WǎngYì), Chinese Internet technology company
