= Wang Wei =

Tang-dynasty Chinese poet, musician, painter, and statesman

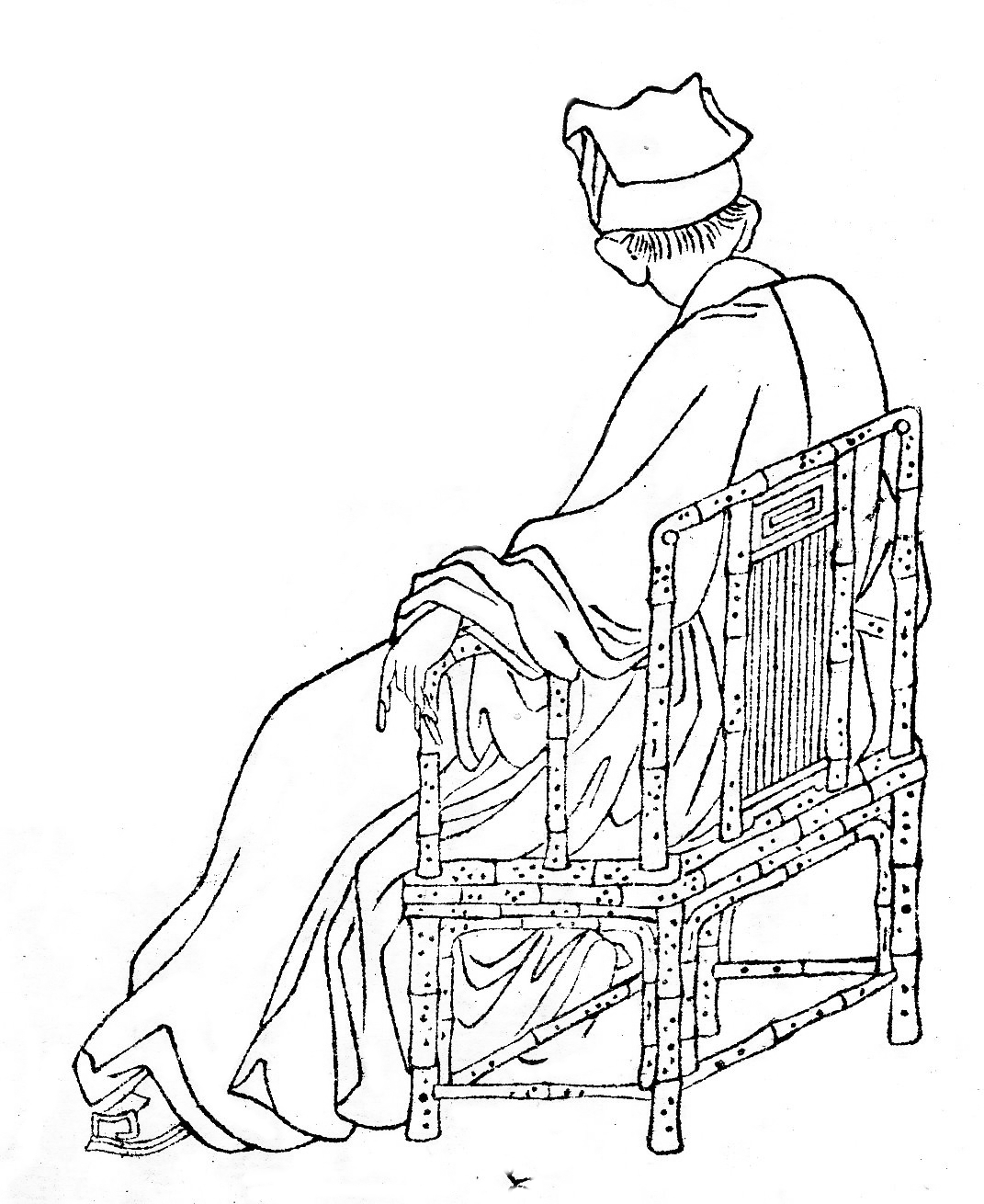
- Born: 699; Qi County, Jinzhong, Shanxi, Wu Zhou dynasty
- Died: 761 (aged 61–62); Chang'an, Tang dynasty (modern-day Xi'an, Shaanxi)
- Occupations: Musician, painter, poet, politician
- Relatives: Wang Jin (brother)
- Writing career
- Period: Tang dynasty

Wang Wei
- Wang's name in Traditional (top) and Simplified (bottom) Chinese characters
- Traditional Chinese: 王維
- Simplified Chinese: 王维
Transcriptions
Standard Mandarin
- Hanyu Pinyin: Wáng Wéi
- Wade–Giles: Wang^{2} Wei^{2}
- IPA: [wǎŋ wěɪ]
Yue: Cantonese
- Yale Romanization: Wòhng Wàih
- Jyutping: Wong4 Wai4
- IPA: [wɔŋ˩ wɐj˩]
Southern Min
- Tâi-lô: Ông Uî
Middle Chinese
- Middle Chinese: ɦuang jwi

(courtesy name)
- Traditional Chinese: 摩詰
- Simplified Chinese: 摩诘
Transcriptions
Standard Mandarin
- Hanyu Pinyin: Mójié
- IPA: [mwǒtɕjě]
Yue: Cantonese
- Yale Romanization: Mō-kit
Southern Min
- Tâi-lô: Môo-khiat

Wang Wei (simplified Chinese: 王维; traditional Chinese: 王維; pinyin: Wáng Wéi; 699–761), courtesy name Mojie, was a Chinese musician, painter, poet, and politician of the middle Tang dynasty. He is regarded as one of the most distinguished men of arts and letters of his era. About 400 of his poems survived and 29 of them are included in the 18th-century anthology Three Hundred Tang Poems. A large portion of his finest poems drew inspirations from the local landscape.

Wang Wei is renowned for his dual talents as a nature poet and landscape painter. His poems were originally compiled and edited into a collection by his next-youngest brother, Wang Jin, at imperial command. Of his paintings, no authenticated specimens survive, although there was evidence of his work through influences on later paintings and descriptive accounts. His musical talents were highly regarded; however, no compositions or music notes have been preserved. He had a successful career as an imperial court official. Later in life, he became a devout Chan Buddhist and a vegetarian. He spent ten years studying with Chan master Daoguang.

== Names ==
Wang adopted the courtesy name Mojie and signed many of his works "Wang Weimojie". Wei-mo-Jie (維摩詰) was a reference to Vimalakirti, the central figure of the Buddhist sutra by the same name. In this Buddhist text presented partly in the form of a debate with Mañjuśrī (the Bodhisattva of Wisdom), the lay devotee Vimalakīrti expounds the doctrine of Śūnyatā, or emptiness, to an assembly that includes arhats and bodhisattvas, and then culminates with the wordless teaching conveyed through silence.

== Life ==
=== Early years ===
Born into an aristocratic family of Han ethnicity, originally from Qixian (present-day Qi County in Shanxi province), Wang Wei's father moved east of the Yellow River to Puzhou, part of the historic Hedong Commandery (now Yongji, Shanxi). Known for his youthful precocity, Wang Wei, the eldest of five brothers, set off for Chang’an, the imperial capital, at the age of nineteen to prepare for the civil service examination. While residing in Chang'an before taking the test, Wang gained favor at the court due to his poetic and musical talents, particularly in playing the instrument pipa. He passed the palace examination in 721 with top position known as the Zhuangyuan, setting the stage for a potentially lucrative civil service career.

Wang Wei's official career experienced ups and downs. His initial appointment was a court musician, or "Deputy Master of Music". However, he was subsequently demoted to overseeing a granary in the former province of Jizhou (now the name of a different town Jizhou, in Hebei). The reason for this demotion was Wang's breach of conventional etiquette by performing a lion dance. In any case, this proved to be only a minor setback to his career, and it had a compensatory aspect as it afforded him the opportunity to travel. Subsequently, a sequence of promotions following this demotion was apparently attributable to his association with the prominent governmental minister, poet, and literary scholar Zhang Jiuling. This connection persisted, at least until Zhang's 727 demotion to a post in Jingzhou. By 728, Wang Wei had returned to Chang'an, where he hosted the poet Meng Haoran, forging a close friendship and poetic collaboration. At this point, Wang seems to have attained the rank of Assistant Censor, followed by a subsequent promotion within the government. However, he experienced a later demotion back to Assistant Censor, coinciding with the decline in imperial favor of Zhang Jiuling and the rising political influence of Li Linfu. After his wife's death in 731, he never remarried. In his capacity as a government official, he was dispatched to Liangzhou, then the northwestern frontier of the Chinese empire and a region marked by continual military conflicts. Invited by the local commander, Wang served in this location until his return to Chang'an in 738 or early 739.

=== Middle years ===
After returning to Chang'an from Liangzhou, and lacking an official posting, Wang Wei took the opportunity to explore the countryside south of the capital, in the Lantian area within the Zhongnan Mountains. During his time there, Wang Wei formed a friendship with fellow poet Pei Di. In 740–741 Wang resumed his governmental career, which included an inspection tour of Xiangyang, Hubei (the home of Meng Haoran). Following this, Wang held various positions in Chang'an. In addition to his governmental salary, he earned income as an artist, enabling him to acquire the extensive Lantian estate once owned by the poet Song Zhiwen, known as Wang Chuan. After the death of his mother in 747–748, Wang Wei erected a shrine in her honor at the estate, observing a traditional three-year mourning period. Overwhelmed by grief, Wang Wei was reduced almost to a skeleton. By 751–752 Wang Wei resumed his official duties. However, historical records from this point become cloudy due to the devastating effects of the An Shi disorders.

=== War ===
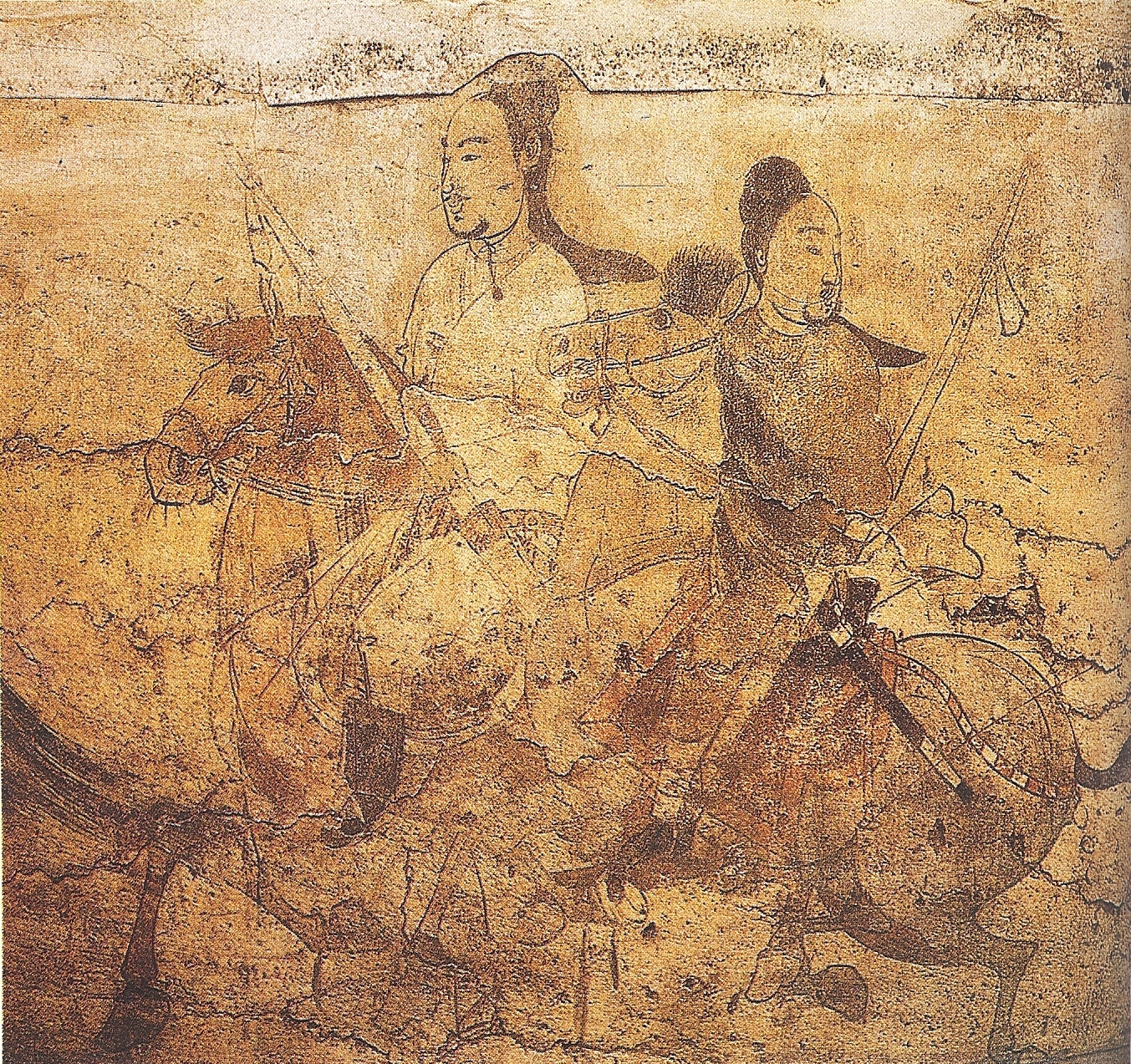
Riders on Horseback, Northern Qi dynasty, the general area of the rebel heartland, although of an earlier date

The An-Shi disorders (755 - 763) profoundly impacted Chinese society in general and Wang Wei in particular, although Nicolas Tackett has recently argued that it was not as destructive to the Tang aristocracy as had previously been thought. In 756, Wang Wei was residing in the capital of Chang'an, where he was captured by the rebels when they took over the city. While Emperor Xuanzong, his court, and most of the governmental officials had already evacuated to Sichuan; Wang Wei, plagued by dysentery, was incapacitated and unable to travel, especially through the challenging mountainous terrain of the region. The rebels subsequently transported him to their capital at Luoyang, where the rebel government sought his collaboration. Some sources suggest that in an attempt to avoid actively assisting the insurgents, Wang Wei feigned deafness; others state that he consumed medicine to damage his voice. Regardless, in Luoyang, Wang Wei became officially affiliated with the rebels and was given an official title. In 757, with the ascendency of Emperor Suzong and the Tang's recapture of Luoyang from the rebel forces, Wang Wei was arrested and imprisoned by the Tang government on charges of treason.

The charges were eventually dropped, in part due to the intervention of Wang Wei's brother, Wang Jin. Wang Jin held a high government rank as the Undersecretary of the Board of Punishments, and his loyal efforts in the defense of Taiyuan were well recognized. Furthermore, the poems Wang Wei had written during his captivity were produced and accepted as evidence of his loyalty. Following his pardon, Wang Wei dedicated much of his time to Buddhist practice and activities. Subsequently, with the further suppression of the rebellion, he re-entered government service in 758, initially in a lower position compared to before the rebellion, as a tàizǐ zhōngchōng (太子中充), serving in the court of the crown prince rather than the emperor himself. In 759, Wang Wei not only regained his former position in the emperor's court but was eventually promoted. Over time, he was moved up to the secretarial position of jǐshìzhōng (給事中) and his last position, which he held until his death in 761, was shàngshū yòuchéng (尚書右丞), or deputy prime minister. These positions, located in the city of Chang'an, were conveniently close to his private estate, allowing him to visit and maintain it. Throughout this period, Wang Wei continued to pursue his artistic endeavors.

=== Later years ===
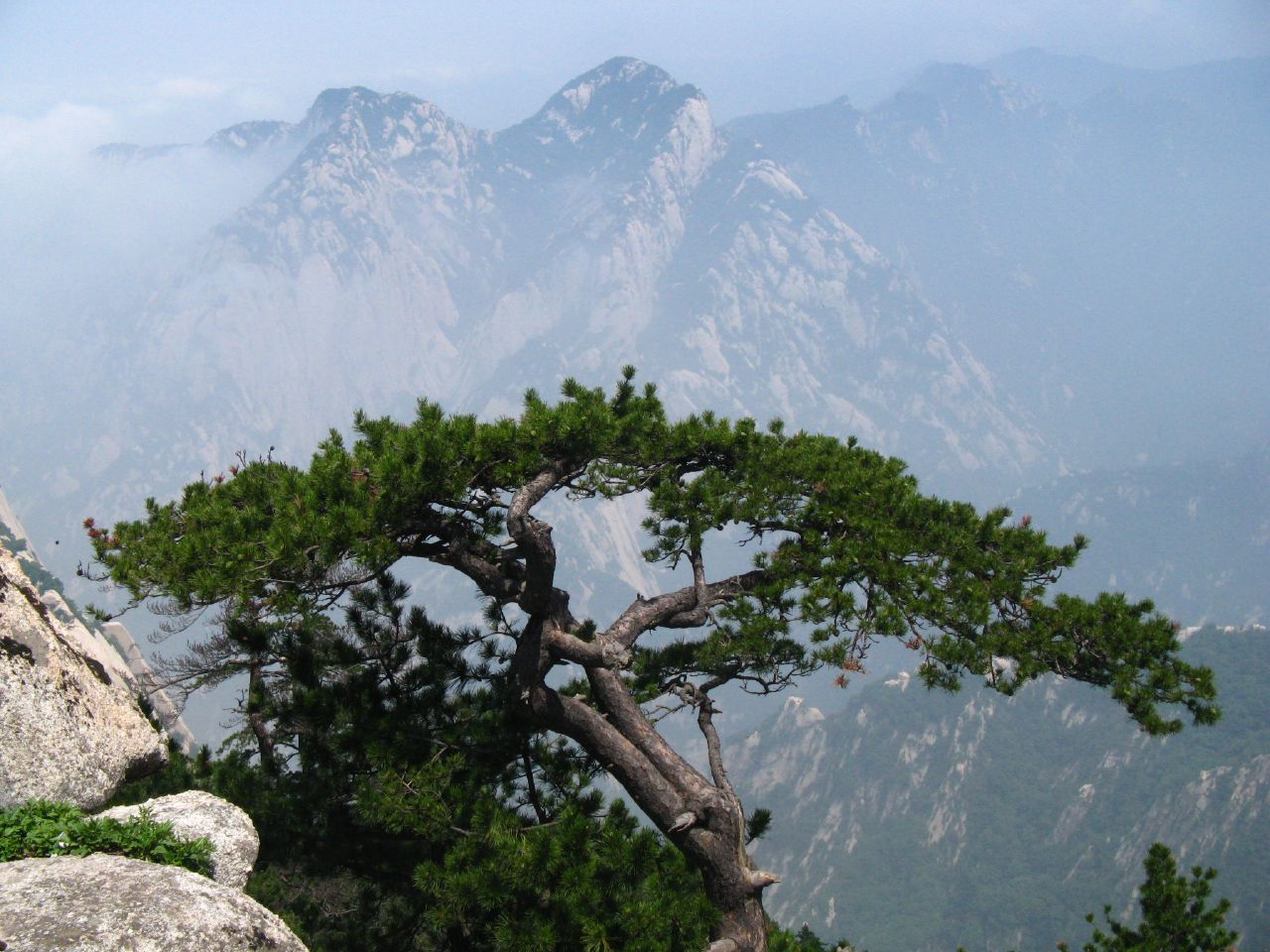
A modern picture from Mount Hua, in the Qinling Mountain Range, perhaps suggesting some of the area's wild and rugged features which still exist today, and which would have also been enjoyed by Wang Wei and his friends.

Wang Wei never lived to see the empire's return to peace, as the An-Shi disorder and its aftermath continued beyond his lifetime. Nonetheless, he found some solace and stability which were non-existent during the early years of the rebellion. Particularly, he had the opportunity to spend time in the relative seclusion of his Lantian estate that offered him a poetic and Buddhist retreat. He was able to spend time with friends and connect with nature, continue to engage in painting and writing. Eventually, his days came to an end. In the seventh month of 759 or 761, Wang Wei requested writing implements and wrote several letters to his brother and to his friends before dying. He was then buried at his Lantian estate.

== Works ==
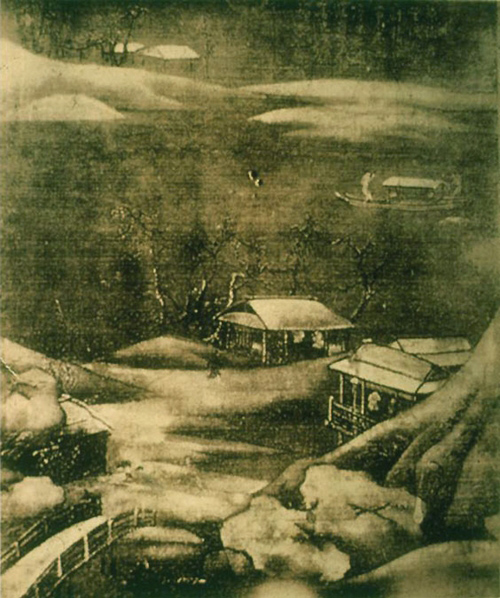
Photograph of Wang Wei's Snowy River. Formerly part of the Manchu Family Collection, Beijing, now lost.

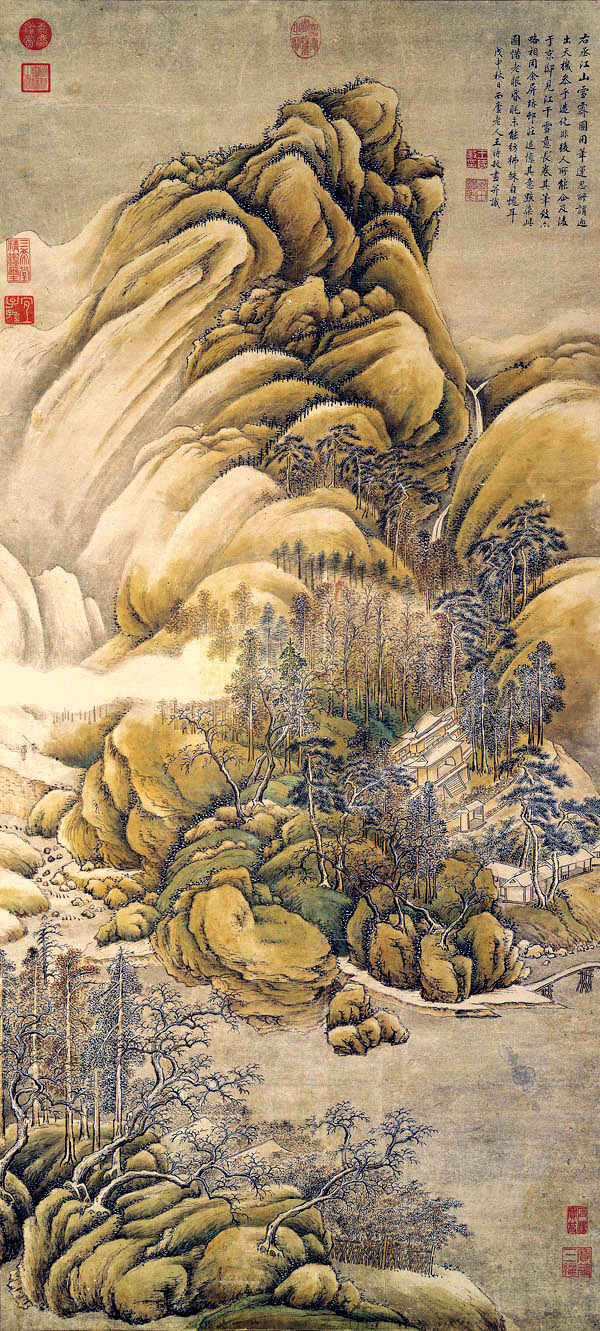
After Wang Wei's 'Snow Over Rivers and Mountains', Wang Shimin (1668), National Palace Museum

Wang Wei was accomplished in both his poetry and his paintings, on which the Song dynasty literati Su Shi commented: "The quality of Wang Wei’s poems can be summed up as, 'a painting within a poem.' Observing his paintings you see, 'within the painting there is poetry.'" He is especially known for his compositions in the Mountains and Streams (Shanshui) poetry genre, also known as "the landscape" school of poetry, along with fellow poet Meng Haoran. The two poets were often collectively referred to as "Wang Meng" (a combination of their surnames), to their shared excellence in poetic composition as contemporaries.

In his later years, Wang Wei lost interest in being a statesman and became more involved in Buddhism practice, particularly Chan Buddhism. This practice significantly influenced his poems, leading to his posthumous recognition as the "Poet Buddha." His works are collected in Secretary General Wang's Anthology, which includes 400 poems. He excelled in painting images of people, bamboo forests and scenery of mountains and rivers. It is recorded that his landscape paintings have two different genres, one of the Father and Son of the Li Family (李氏父子) and the other being of strong brush strokes. His work of Picture of Wang River is of the latter, but unfortunately the original no longer exists. His works of Scenery of Snow and Creek and Jinan’s Fusheng Portrait are both realistic in their representation of the subjects.

At present 420 poems are attributed to Wang Wei, of which 370 are thought to be genuine. Wang Wei was a "very great master" of the Jueju, or the Chinese quatrain. Many of his Jueju depict quiet scenes of water and mist, with few details and little human presence. The Indiana Companion comments that he affirms the world's beauty, while questioning its ultimate reality. It also draws a comparison between the deceptive simplicity of his works and the Chan path to enlightenment, which is built on careful preparation but is achieved without conscious effort.

One of Wang Wei's famous poems is "Longing" (相思; Xiang Si), a quatrain known for its heartfelt emotions expressed in the simplest language.

Original Chinese	English Translation
相思 紅豆生南國 春來發幾枝 願君多採擷 此物最相思	Longing The red beans grow in the southern country, In the spring a few twigs come out above. I would urge you gather as much as you can, For they are the best tokens of love.

=== Wang River Collection ===
Some of Wang Wei's most famous poetry was done as a series of 20 quatrains, matched by his friend Pei Di's verses on the same topic and title. Together, these poems form a group titled the Wang River Collection (輞川集; Wǎngchuān jí). These poems are sometimes referred to as the "Lantian poems", after the real name of Wang's estate's location, in what is now Lantian County.

Inspired in part by Wang's Lantian home and features of its neighborhood and by their correspondences with other places and features, the Wang River Collection includes such pieces as the poem often translated "Deer Park" (literally, "Deer Fence"). However, the poems tend to have a deceptive simplicity to them, while they actually have great depth and complexity upon closer examination. Below is a selection of several of Wang's "Wang River Collection" quatrains, with English translations by the American sinologist Stephen Owen.

空山不見人，
但聞人語響。
返景入深林，
復照青苔上。

— "Deer Fence" (鹿柴; Lù Chái)
Translation:

No one is seen in deserted hills,
Only the echoes of speech are heard.
Sunlight cast back comes deep in the woods
And shines once again upon the green moss.

— Stephen Owen, trans.

仄逕蔭宮槐，
幽陰多綠苔。
應門但迎埽，
畏有山僧來。

— "The Lane of Palace Ash Trees" (宮槐陌; Gōng Huái Mò)
Translation:

A slanting path, shaded by palace ash,
In hidden shadows is much green moss.
The gatekeeper sweeps only for visitors,
Wary a mountain monk may come.

— Stephen Owen, trans.

輕舸迎上客，
悠悠湖上來。
當軒對尊酒，
四面芙蓉開。

— "Pavilion Overlooking the Lake" (臨湖亭; Lín Hú Tíng)
Translation:

A light scull greets my worthy guest
Who comes from afar across the lake.
We will sit facing wine by the balcony
With lotuses blooming on every side.

— Stephen Owen, trans.

颯颯秋雨中，
淺淺石溜瀉。
跳波自相濺，
白鷺驚復下。

— "Rapids by the Luan Trees" (欒家瀨; Luán Jiā Lài)
Translation:

The moaning of wind in autumn rain,
Swift waters trickling over the stones.
Leaping waves strike one another—
A white egret flies up in alarm, then comes down.

— Stephen Owen, trans.

獨坐幽篁裏，
彈琴復長嘯。
深林人不知，
明月來相照。

— "Lodge in the Bamboo" (竹里館; Zhú Lǐ Guǎn)
Translation:

I sit alone in bamboo that hides me,
Plucking the harp and whistling long.
It is deep in the woods and no one knows—
Bright moon comes to shine on me.

— Stephen Owen, trans.

=== Other poetry ===
Villa on Zhongnan Mountain (終南別業)

中歲頗好道，
晚家南山陲。
興來每獨往，
勝事空自知。
行到水窮處，
坐看雲起時。
偶然值林叟，
談笑無還期。

Translation:

In my middle years I came to much love the Way
and late made my home by South Mountain's edge.
When the mood comes upon me, I go off alone,
and have glorious moments all to myself.
I walk to the point where a stream ends,
and sitting, watch when the clouds rise.
By chance I meet old men in the woods;
we laugh and chat, no fixed time to turn home.

— Translated by Stephen Owen

=== Painting ===
Wang Wei has historically been regarded as the founder of the Southern School of Chinese landscape art, a school which was characterised by strong brushstrokes contrasted with light ink washes.

== Cultural references ==
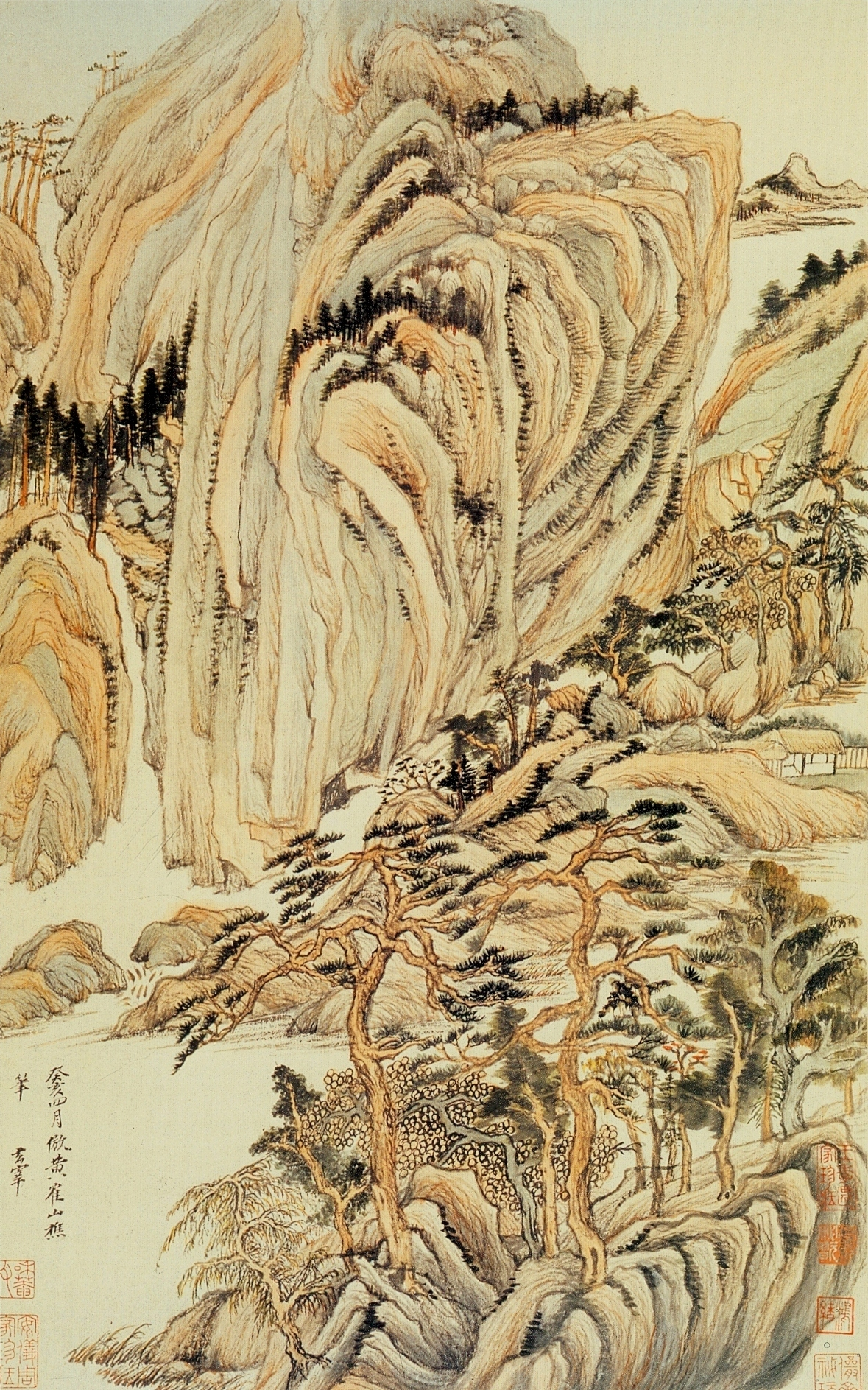
Dong Qichang's painting of "Landscapes in the Manner of Old Masters" (Wang Wei). Album leaf. Nelson-Atkins Museum

=== Influence in the East ===
Wang Wei was of extensive influence in China and its area of cultural influence, particularly in terms of monochrome ink painting and in terms of his deceptively simple and insightful Buddhist-influenced poetry. Wang Shimin and Wang Yuanqi of the Six Masters of the early Qing period painted works in the style of Wang Wei, as well as copying his paintings as "copying former masters was seen as the cornerstone of artistic training." In the Ming dynasty, Dong Qichang included Wang Wei's style in his paintings after the old masters.

One of Wang Wei's poems, called Weicheng Qu or "Song of the City of Wei" has been adapted to the famous music melody, Yangguan Sandie or "Three Refrains on the Yang Pass". The most famous version of this melody is based on a tune for guqin first published in 1864 but may be traced back to a version from 1530.

Wang Wei's lasting influence is seen in the death poem of the Japanese haiku master Yosa Buson:

winter warbler;
long ago in Wang Wei's
hedge also

=== Influence in the West ===
Wang Wei's poetry in translation formed the inspiration for the final Der Abschied movement of the Austrian composer Gustav Mahler's penultimate completed work, Das Lied von der Erde. "Der Abschied" is set to a loose German translation of Wang Wei's Farewell (送别), a work addressed to fellow poet Meng Haoran on the occasion of his retirement (after a brief civil service career) to become a scholar-recluse (yinshi, 隱士).

送别

下馬飲君酒
問君何所之
君言不得意
歸臥南山陲
但去莫復問
白雲無盡時

Translation:
Farewell

"Alight and bide a while my friend,"
a cup of wine I recommend.
"Whither go ye on this journey?"
Disappointments, you confide —
"On South Hill's fringes I'll reside,
retire by the mountainside."
"Go, good friend," my queries end.
Yonder, white clouds time transcend.

Wang Wei's poetry as found in the works of Ernest Fenollosa also provided inspiration for the American poet Ezra Pound in the creation of Pound's Ideogrammic Method.

His art inspired Innisfree Garden in Millbrook, New York.

The Wang River Sequence has been set for choir by UK composer Peter McGarr in his piece 'Beautiful Days'.

== See also ==
- Chinese poetry
- Tang poetry
- Dong Yuan
- Han Gan
- List of Chinese language poets
- List of Chinese painters
- List of Chinese National Treasures of Japan
- Shen Kuo
- Shi (poetry)
- Tang poetry
- Wangchuan ji
- Wang Jin
- Wang Yuanqi

== Critical editions ==
- Wang Youcheng Ji Jianzhu 《王右丞集箋注》 (An Annotated Edition of the Collected Works of Wang [Wei] the Right Assistant Secretary of State Affairs). Edited by Zhao Diancheng (趙殿成) (1683–1756). Shanghai: Shanghai Ancient Books Publishing House, 1961.
