= Four Wangs =

Grouping of Chinese painters

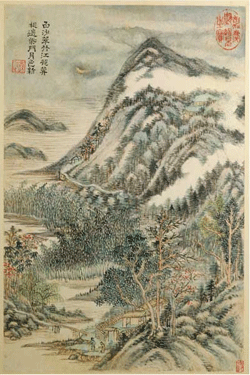
Wang Shimin, Landscapes Inspired by Du Fu's Poetry

Painting of Wang Jian

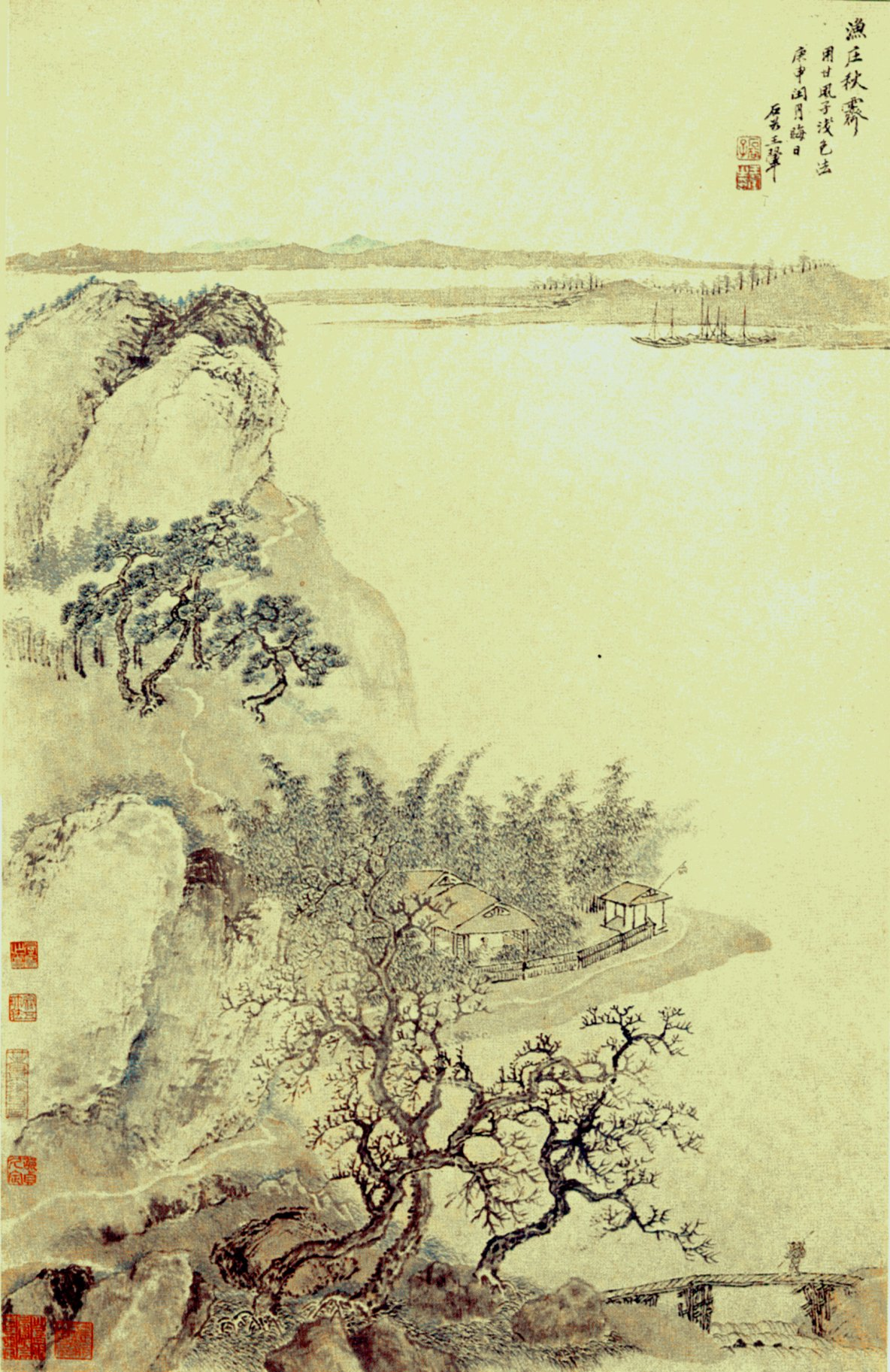
Wang Hui, Fisherman Huts and Clearing Skies in Autumn

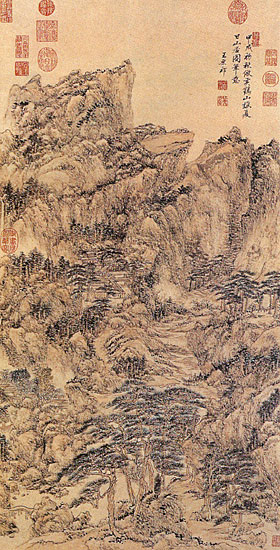
Wang Yuanqi, Mountain Dwelling on a Summer Day

The Four Wangs (Chinese: 四王; pinyin: Sì Wáng; Wade–Giles: Ssŭ Wang) were four Chinese landscape painters during the Qing dynasty in the 17th century, all with the surname Wang. They are best known for their accomplishments in shan shui painting.

== The painters ==
They were Wang Shimin (1592–1680), Wang Jian (1598–1677), Wang Hui (1632–1717) and Wang Yuanqi (1642–1715). They were members of the group known as the Six Masters of the early Qing period.

== Philosophy ==
The Four Wangs represented the so-called "orthodox school" of painting at the time. The school was based on the teachings of Dong Qichang (1555–1636). It was “orthodox” in the Confucian sense that it had continuing traditional modes, as they were in contrast to the "Individualist" painters such as Bada Shanren and Shitao.

== See also ==
- Four Masters of the Yuan Dynasty
- Four Masters of the Ming Dynasty
