= Six Masters of the early Qing period =

Grouping of major Chinese painters during the Qing dynasty period (1636–1912)

The Six Masters of the early Qing period (Chinese: 清六家; pinyin: Qīng Liù Jiā; Wade–Giles: Ch'ing Liu Chia) were a group of major Chinese artists who worked in the 17th and early 18th centuries during the Qing dynasty. Also known as orthodox masters, they continued the tradition of the scholar-painter, following the injunctions of the artist-critic Dong Qichang late in the Ming dynasty.

The Six Masters included the flower painter Yun Shouping and the landscapists Wu Li as well as the Four Wangs: Wang Shimin, Wang Jian, Wang Yuanqi, and Wang Hui. The works of the Six Masters are generally conservative, cautious, subtle, and complex, in contrast to the vigorous and vivid painting of their "individualist" contemporaries.

One of the most famous works produced by a member of the group is the White Clouds over Xiao and Xiang, a hanging scroll after Zhao Mengfu by Wang Jian, made in ink and colour on paper, 1668, which is exhibited in the Freer Gallery of Art, Washington, D.C.

== See also ==
- Four Masters of the Yuan dynasty
- Four Masters of the Ming dynasty
