= Lü Shi-Yi =

Calligrapher (1784–1855)

Lü Shi-Yi (呂世宜, 1784–1855) was a prominent figure in the field of painting and calligraphy. He used the courtesy names Kehe and literary pseudonyms Xicun, Zhonghuadaoren, Piaodaoren, Baihua Piaozhu, Wanpihanzi, and Tiesheng, later known as Buweng and Rankan, He was also known by his studio name, Ai Wulu. Hailing from Kinmen, Lü Shi-Yi was a skilled artist and calligrapher.

== Life ==
Lü Shi-Yi moved to Xiamen in his early years. In the 13th year of Jiaqing's reign (1808), he achieved the title of Xiucai (a successful candidate in the imperial examinations at the county level). In the 2nd year of the Daoguang's reign (1822), he obtained the title of Juren (a successful candidate in the imperial examinations at the provincial level). He served as a teacher at various institutions, such as Zhishan Academy in Zhangzhou and Yuping Academy in Xiamen. He assisted Zhou Kai in editing Chronicle of Kinmen and Chronicle of Xiamen.

In Daoguang's 17th year (1837), he arrived in Taiwan and accepted an invitation from the Lin family of Banqiao to work as a private tutor. He collected various stone inscriptions and tablets and became known as one of the "Three Sages of Banqiao," along with Xie Guanqiao and Ye Huacheng.

In his later years, he served as a member of the Hanlin Academy and personally inscribed his own epitaph on the back of an inkstone, which was then buried with him upon his passing in 1854. The inkstone was discovered in 1989 in Kinmen, and it is speculated that it was unearthed by tomb raiders after the Cultural Revolution. Lü Shi-Yi's former residence in Dongcun, Kinmen (No. 16 Dongcun, Jinhua Town, Kinmen County), has been designated as a county-level historic site by the Kinmen County Cultural Affairs Bureau. The National Museum of History preserves his calligraphic works, including a set of four hanging scrolls in the clerical script, which have been designated as important cultural artifacts.

== Works ==
Lü Shi-Yi's writings include stone inscriptions such as "Forty-Nine Stone House Inscription" and "You Shi Lou Inscription." He authored works such as Notes and Annotations of Ai Wulu, Collected Works of Ai Wulu, Notes of Ai Wulu, General Knowledge of Ancient and Modern Characters, and Explanations of the Thousand Character Classic.

== Gravesite ==
In 2006, Xiamen calligraphy enthusiast Zhang Wenjie discovered a tombstone on Mount Dachu that was confirmed to be that of Lü Shi-Yi. The tomb has been designated as a cultural heritage site related to Taiwan and the tombstone was relocated to a museum. A replica is displayed in its original location.
