= Zeng Jing =

Chinese painter

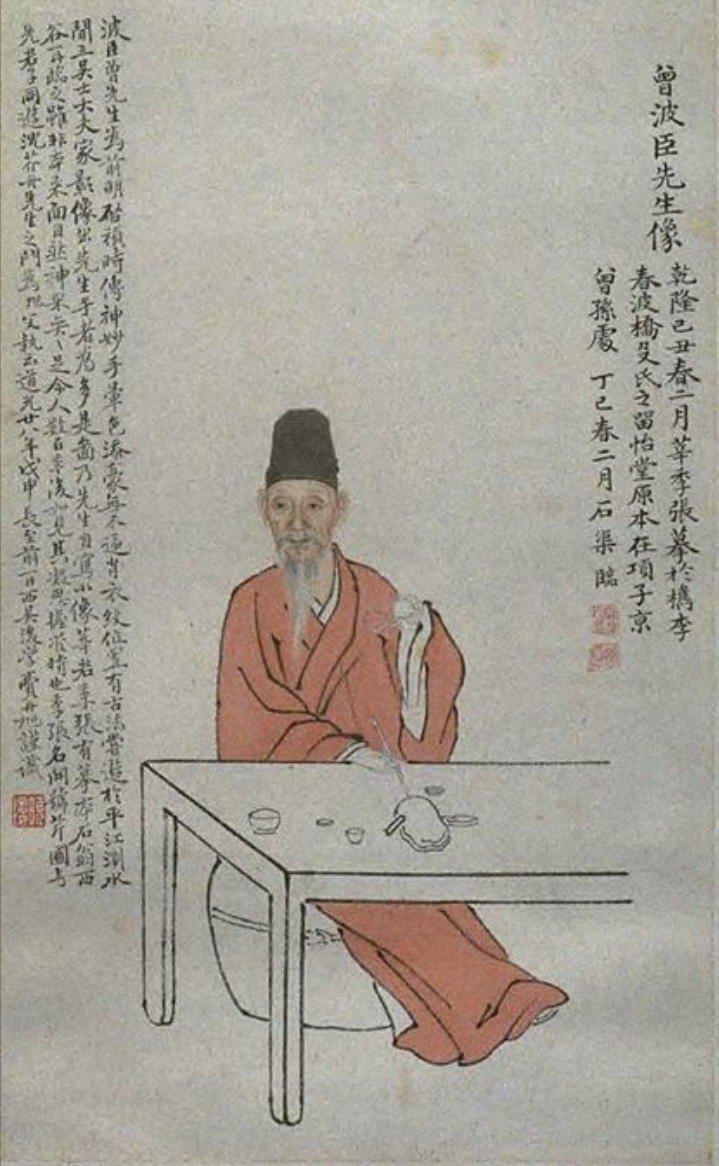
Portrait of Zeng Jing

Zeng Jing (simplified Chinese: 曾鲸; traditional Chinese: 曾鯨; Wade–Giles: Tseng Ching, courtesy name Bochen 波臣); ca. 1564 – 1647 was a Chinese painter during the Ming Dynasty (1368–1644). He was best known as a portrait painter.

== Biography ==
Zeng was born in Putian in the Fujian province. He lived and worked in Nanjing, but also moved around Hangzhou, Wuzhen, Ningbo, Songjiang, and other cities.

== Painting style ==
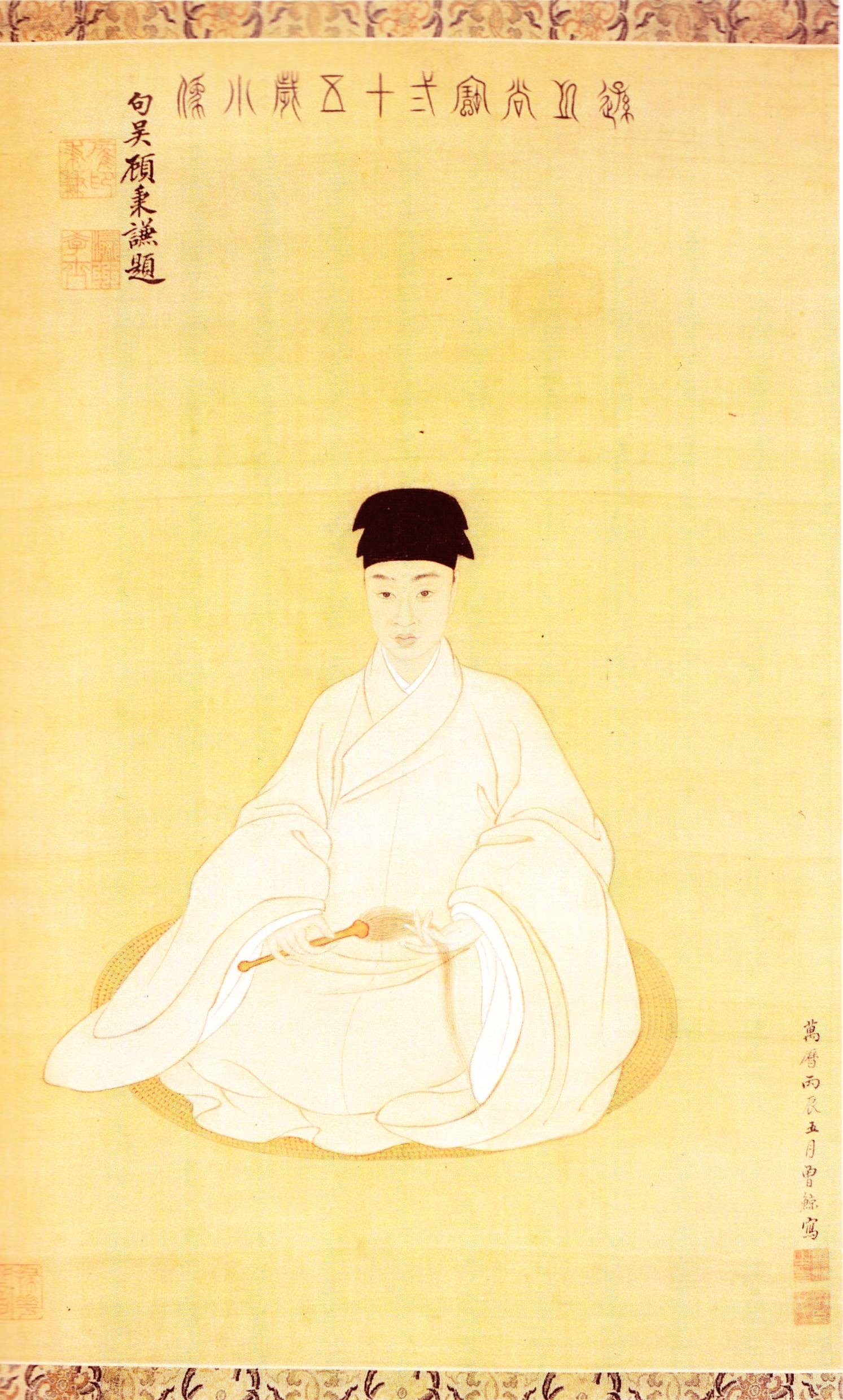
Portrait of Wang Shimin by Zeng Jing

Zeng Jing painted using subtle light and shade, and he was considered by many critics as being significant for his assimilation of illusionistic concave and convex method of western oil painting. His portraits were described as "breathtaking real, as though they were reflection of the sitter in the mirror." A common feature of his portrait is the presence of large area of empty spaces surrounding the figure.

The style of Zeng Jing was distinctive enough that it became known as Bochen style, after Zeng's style name 'Bochen'. His followers and disciples are known as the Bochen school, and the most accomplished amongst them include Xie Bin (1601-1681).

His work is held at several museums, including the University of Michigan Museum of Art, the Art Institute of Chicago, and others.
