= Hsieh Guan-chiao =

Ancient Chinese artist

Hsieh Guan-chiao (Chinese:謝琯樵, 1811–1864), born in Zhao'an, Fujian, with the courtesy name Ying Su (穎蘇) and the alias Lan Yun (懶雲), was a significant artist who migrated to Taiwan during the Qing Dynasty. He played a crucial role in the cultural scene of Taiwan during that era. Alongside Lu Shiyi (呂世宜) and Ye Hua-cheng (葉化成), he was once commissioned by the Lin Ben-yuan (林本源) family in Taipei and Banqiao, earning them the collective title of the "Three Masters of the Lin Family." (林家三先生)

== Life ==
Hsieh Guan-chiao was born on the sixth day of the third lunar month in the sixteenth year of the Jiaqing reign (March 29, 1811). His father, Hsieh Sheng-he (謝聲鶴), was a renowned scholar of classical Chinese literature serving as an instructor in various counties in Fujian, including Xianyou and Qingliu. Hsieh Guan-chiao's sister, Hsieh Yun-shi (謝芸史), was a female poet known for her work "Yongxuezhai Poetry Collection." (詠雪齋詩鈔)

Known for his interest in military strategy, Hsieh Guan-chiao also excelled in poetry, literature, calligraphy, and painting. He displayed a natural talent for painting at the age of nine and immersed himself in extensive reading of classics for three years. In 1854, during the reign of Xianfeng, he was appointed by the Fujian censor Xu Zonggan (徐宗幹) to serve in the provincial government.

In 1857, responding to an invitation from Yuduo (裕鐸), the military defense commissioner of Taiwan, Hsieh Guan-chiao became the secretary of the eastern hall in the defense office, assisting with administrative tasks. The following year, after Kong Zhaoci (孔昭慈) took over Yuduo's position, Hsieh resigned and went to Tainan, where he taught at the Haidong Academy (海東書院). Later, he was hired as a tutor by the Lin family in Banqiao and subsequently moved to Bangka, then accepted an invitation from Lin Wen-chai (林文察) of the Lin family in Wufeng, Taichung, becoming his aide in Taiwan for about four years.

When Lin Wen-chai was called to serve, Hsieh Guan-chiao accompanied him to mainland China and fought against the Taiping Rebellion (太平天國)at Wansong Pass (萬松關) in Fujian. Upon hearing that Lin Wen-chai was surrounded by the Taiping forces during a meal, Hsieh immediately abandoned his chopsticks and rushed to the rescue. Unfortunately, he also perished in the battle on December 1, 1864.

== Artistic Style ==
Hsieh Guan-chiao excelled in both calligraphy and painting. His calligraphy, influenced by the styles of Yan Zhen-qing (顏真卿) and Mi Fu (米芾), was particularly outstanding in the cursive script, characterized by round and graceful strokes. In his paintings, he often chose plum blossoms, orchids, bamboo, and chrysanthemums, with a particular mastery on bamboo. He demonstrated skill in landscape, floral, and bird-and-flower paintings, and his depiction of bamboo was especially noteworthy. His style in orchid, bamboo, floral, and bird paintings bears the influence of artists such as Hua Yan (華喦), Zheng Ban-qiao (鄭板橋), and Xu Wei (徐渭). In landscape painting, his technique was somewhat reminiscent of Tang Yin (唐寅) and Zhou Chen (周臣), characterized by bold and powerful brushstrokes.

Despite his relatively brief presence in Taiwan, Hsieh Guan-chiao's influence was widespread. His artistic style left a lasting impact, and subsequent generations of calligraphers and painters in Taiwan, including Li Xue-qiao (李學樵) and Chen Yi-qiao (陳奕樵), were influenced by his work. During the Japanese colonial period, the Japanese sinologist Ozaki Hidemasa (尾崎秀真) praised Hsieh Guan-chiao as the "greatest talent on the Yangtze River since the mid-Qing dynasty," (清朝中葉以後長江第一鉅腕) acknowledging his achievements in poetry, prose, calligraphy, and painting.
