= John Laviers Wheatley =

Welsh painter and engraver (1892-1955)

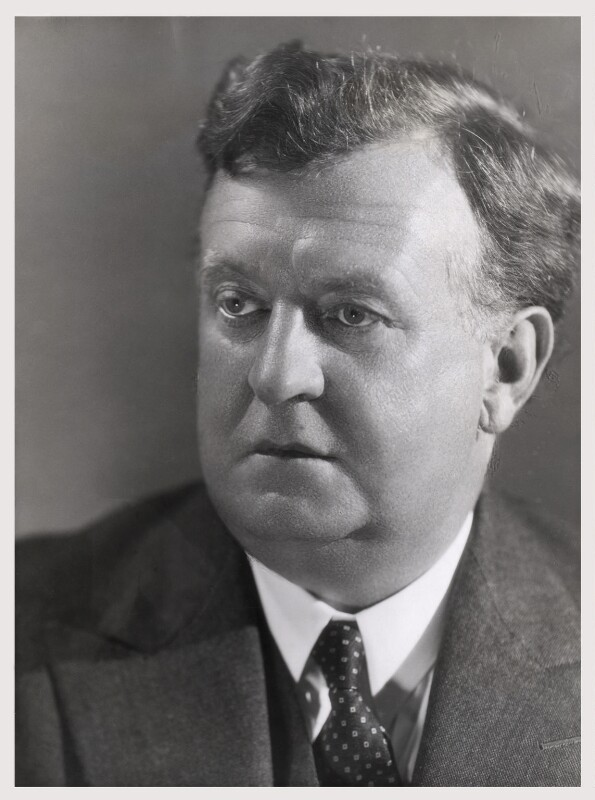
- Wheatley in 1938
- Born: 23 January 1892; Abergavenny, Wales
- Died: 17 November 1955 (aged 63)
- Education: Slade School of Fine Art
- Known for: Painting, Drawing
- Spouse: Edith Grace Wheatley (m.1912–1955, his death)

John Laviers Wheatley ARA (23 January 1892 – 17 November 1955) was a British painter, art teacher and museum director who also served as a war artist in both World War I and in World War II.

== Biography ==
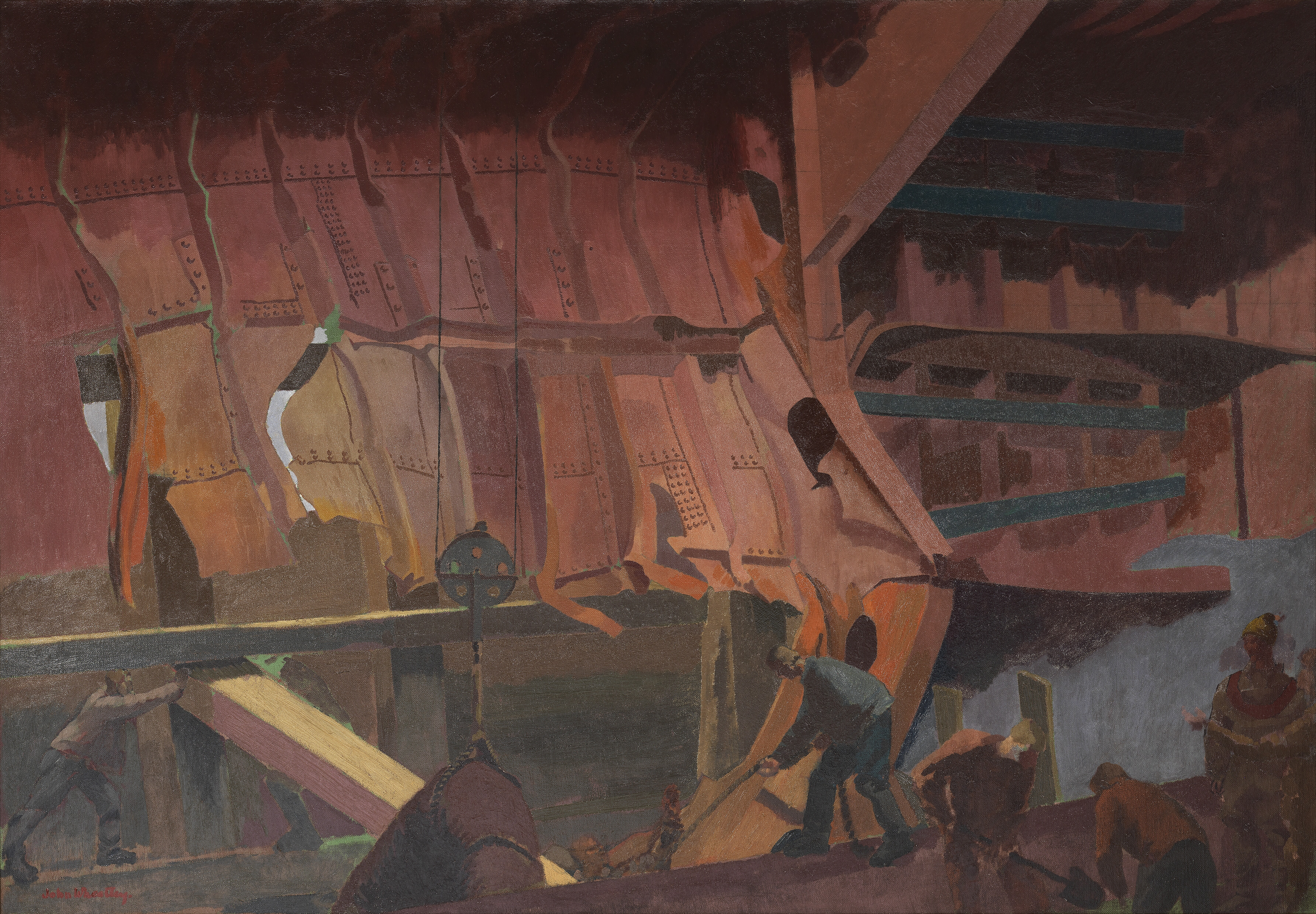
Divers at Work Repairing a Torpedoed Ship (1918) (Art.IWM ART 2245)

Wheatley was born in Abergavenny in Wales and was the only son of Sir Zachariah Wheatley, a former mayor of the town. The younger Wheatley attended the Slade School of Art during 1912 and 1913, having previously taken art lessions from both Stanhope Forbes and Walter Sickert. During World War I, Wheatley served in the Artists' Rifles and later in the conflict was an official war artist. The British War Memorials Committee appointed Wheatley to record the work of the Royal Navy in the British home ports. After a short, and miserable, few days at Rosyth Wheatley was sent to Southampton where he recorded the work of the Salvage Service. He produced over 40 paintings there including a large canvas for the proposed, but never built, national Hall of Remembrance. After the War, Wheatley was commissioned to paint a portrait of James Crichton, a recipient of the Victoria Cross.

Wheatley showed three works at the first annual exhibition of the newly formed Society of Graphic Art in 1921. He held a joint show with Muirhead Bone at the Grosvenor Gallery in 1922 and taught at the Slade for five years from 1920 until 1925 when he, and his wife the artist Edith Grace Wheatley, née Wolfe, moved to South Africa. The couple remained there until 1937, during which time John Wheatley was the Michaelis Professor of Fine Art at the University of Cape Town and Director of the National Gallery of South Africa. On his return to England in 1937, Wheatley was appointed director of the Sheffield City Art Galleries. During the Second World War, the War Artists' Advisory Committee commissioned Wheatley to paint several portraits of workers involved in the war effort. From 1948 to 1950, Wheatley was curator of the National College of British Sports and Pastimes. His work was also part of the painting event in the art competition at the 1948 Summer Olympics.

Two paintings by John Wheatley were burned by demonstrators during the Rhodes Must Fall upheaval at the University of Cape Town in February 2016: a portrait of Edward, Prince of Wales and one of Alexander Brown.

== Memberships ==
Wheatley was a member of, or affiliated with, the following organisations:

- 1943: Elected associate of the Royal Watercolour Society,
- 1945: Elected associate of the Royal Academy,
- 1947: Elected member of the Royal Watercolour Society,
