= Wang Yuanqi =

Chinese painter (1642–1715)

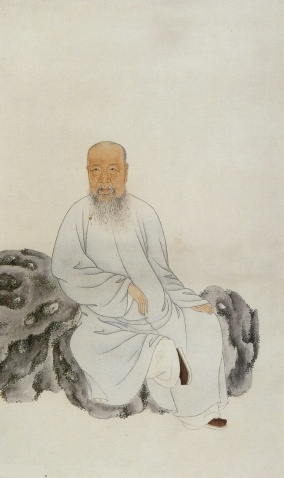
- Born: 1642; Taicang, Jiangsu
- Died: 1715 (aged 73)
- Known for: Shan shui
- Movement: Six Masters of the early Qing period, Four Wangs

Wang Yuanqi (Chinese: 王原祁; pinyin: Wáng Yuánqí; 1642–1715) was a Chinese painter of the Qing dynasty.

Wang was born in Taicang in the Jiangsu province and tutored in painting by his grandfather Wang Shimin (1592–1680). His style name was 'Mao-ching' and his sobriquet was 'Lu-t'ai'. Wang is a member of the Six Masters of the early Qing period, also known as the 'Four Wangs, a Wu and a Yun'. They are also often regarded as the principal figures of the 'Orthodox School' of Chinese landscape painting.

Wang Yuanqi was two years old when the New Qing Dynasty was founded (1644). He rose to prominence as a court official and eventually was appointed curator of the imperial collection during the reign of the Kangxi Emperor. He remained a court official throughout his long career and died at age 73 in 1715.

His landscapes followed the model of the Yuan Dynasty artists who broke away from the Northern Song tradition of rendering landscapes "real enough to walk through" to more personal abstractions. His style and technique demonstrates influences from, for example, the artist Huang Gongwang, especially in the use of dry brush strokes and ink washes and his use of colour, often making "colour patterns a component of his dense compositional structure, complementing the force of abstract design with the rhythmic flow of colour." His 1711 ink and color-on-silk painting, Landscape in the Style of Huang Gongwang, is in Singapore's Asian Civilisations Museum collection and his version of Wang Wei's (now lost) eighth century hand scroll, The Wang River Villa, also painted in 1711, in the Metropolitan Museum of Art, New York City.

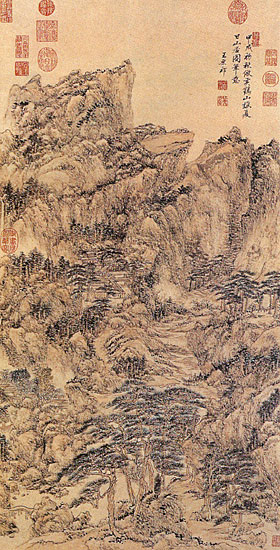
Wang Yuanqi's Mountain Dwelling on a Summer Day
