= Edith Grace Wheatley =

English painter (1888-1970)

- The Artist's Wife by John Laviers Wheatley
- Born: Edith Grace Wolfe; 26 June 1888; London, England
- Died: 28 November 1970 (aged 82)
- Education: Slade School of Art; Académie Colarossi
- Known for: Painting
- Spouse: John Laviers Wheatley (m.1912–1955, his death)

Edith Grace Wheatley née Wolfe (26 June 1888 – 28 November 1970) was a British artist who had a long career as a painter of figures, flowers, birds and animals and as a sculptor.

== Biography ==
Wheatley was born in London and attended the Slade School of Art there from 1906 to 1908 and then studied at the Académie Colarossi in Paris. She spent some time in Newlyn before moving back to London where she established her career as an artist. In 1910 the Walker Art Gallery in Liverpool purchased her watercolour on ivory The Lady Clarissa and a similar drawing Seated Women, from 1913, is in the Tate collection. Wheatley became a regular exhibitor at the Royal Academy showing there numerous times between 1914 and 1964. She also showed with the Royal Miniature Society and at the New English Art Club of which she became an elected member in 1921. In 1912 she married the painter John Laviers Wheatley and in 1925 the couple moved to South Africa. There Edith Grace Wheatley was the senior lecturer in Fine Art at the University of Cape Town while John Wheatley was a professor at the same institution and became director of the National Gallery of South Africa. Edith also completed several public commissions while in Cape Town. These included a sculpture for the city's new law courts plus wall and ceiling paintings for the entrance to the National Gallery. The couple remained in South Africa until 1937 when they returned to England and settled in Sheffield. During World War II Edith Grace Wheatley was commissioned to depict the war's impact on the local steel industry. To this end she greatly changed her painting style. The resulting large paintings, Forging six-pounder shell bodies, Kilnhurst steel works and The tyre mill, Kilnhurst steel works, were shown at the Royal Academy in 1945 and 1946 respectively.

Wheatley was elected an associate member of the Royal Watercolour Society in 1945 and was elected a full member in 1952.
