= Wang Jian (Qing dynasty) =

Chinese landscape painter

- Born: 1598; Taicang, Jiangsu
- Died: 1677 (aged 79)
- Known for: Shan shui
- Movement: Six Masters of the early Qing period

Wang Jian (simplified Chinese: 王鉴; traditional Chinese: 王鑒; pinyin: Wáng Jiàn; Wade–Giles: Wang Jian); c. 1598–1677 was a Chinese landscape painter during the Ming dynasty (1368–1644) and Qing dynasty (1644–1912).

Wang was born in Taicang in the Jiangsu province. His style name was Xuanzhao (玄照) and his pseudonyms were 'Xiangbi' (湘碧) and 'Ranxiang anzhu' (染香庵主). Wang's precise color style of painting was influenced by Dong Yuan. His own works stand out, and he is a member of the Four Wangs and Six Masters of the early Qing period.
