= Wang Yi (painter) =

Chinese painter

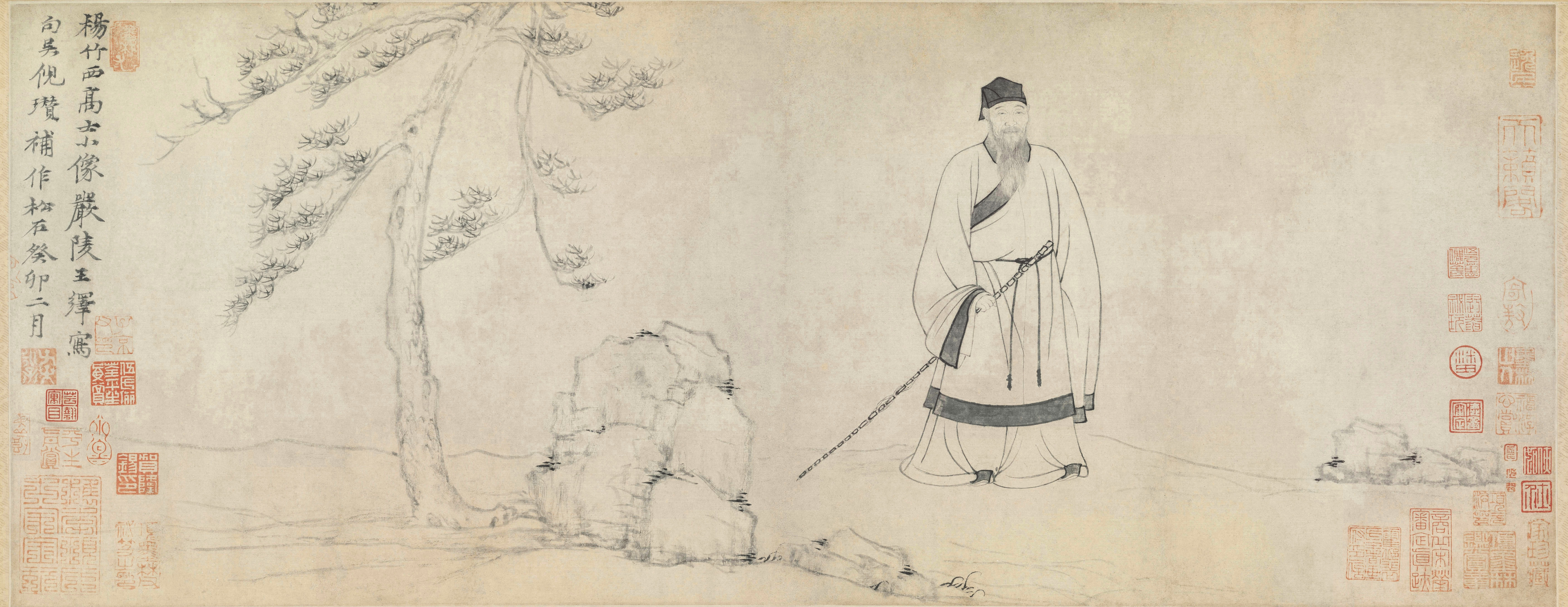
Wang Yi and Ni Zan : Portrait of Yang Zhuxi. Dated 1363. Tha Palace Museum, Beijing, China

Wang Yi (simplified Chinese: 王绎; traditional Chinese: 王繹; pinyin: Wáng Yì; Wade–Giles: Wang I); ca. (1333-unknown) was a Chinese painter of human figures during the Yuan Dynasty (1271–1368). His specific date of death is unknown.

Wang was born in Muzhou (睦州 present day Jiande 建德) in Zhejiang province and lived in Hangzhou. His style name was 'Sishan' (思善) and his pseudonym was 'Chi Juesheng' (痴绝生). Wang's developed his own distinct style of painting human figures that demonstrated good shape and spirit. He edited "The Secrets of Painting Human Figures" (写像密诀) to describe his experiences of human figure painting.
