= Wang Hui (Qing dynasty) =

Chinese landscape painter (1632–1717)

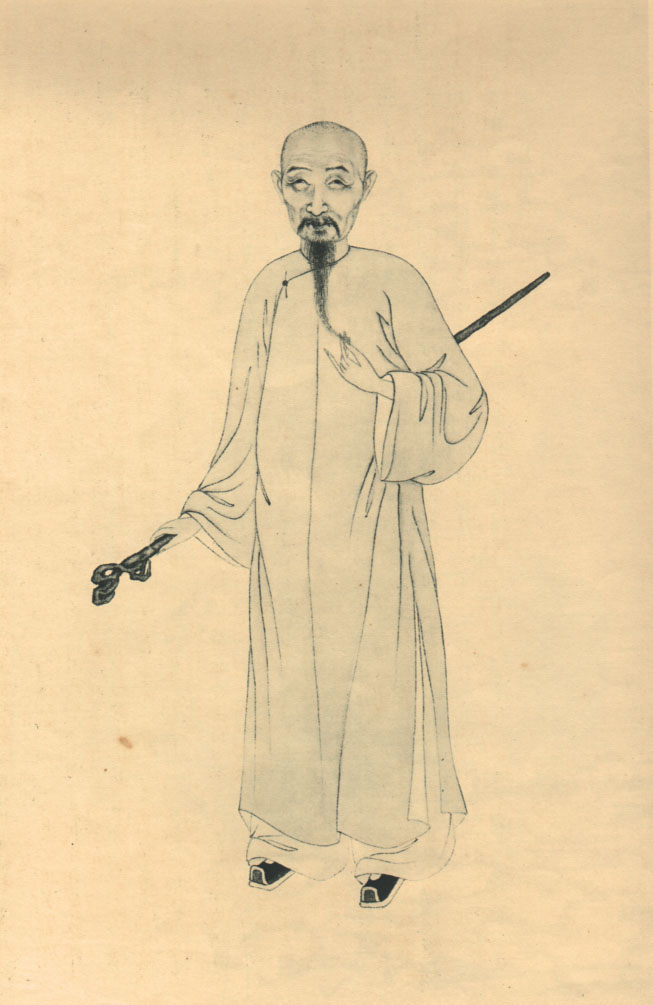
- Born: 1632; Changshu, Jiangsu
- Died: 1717 (aged 84–85)
- Known for: Shan shui

Wang Hui (simplified Chinese: 王翚; traditional Chinese: 王翬; pinyin: Wáng Huī; 1632–1717) was a Chinese landscape painter, one of the Four Wangs. He, and the three other Wangs, dominated orthodox art in China throughout the late Ming and early Qing periods. Of the Four Wangs, Wang Hui is considered the best-known today.

Beijing, Shanghai and Taipei museums loaned works for "Landscapes Clear and Radiant: The Art of Wang Hui (1632-1717)" in 2008 at the Metropolitan Museum of Art in New York.

== Biography ==
Wang Hui followed in the footprints of his great-grandfathers, grandfather, father and uncles and learned painting at a very early age. He was later taught by two contemporary masters, Zhang Ke and Wang Shimin, who taught him to work in the tradition of copying famous Chinese paintings.

== Gallery ==
Wang Hui, A Thousand Peaks and Myriad Ravines 1693

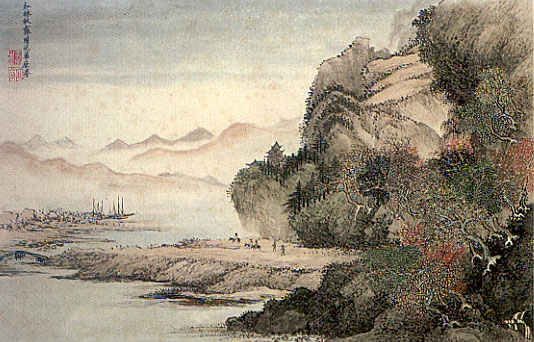
Wang Hui, (need title)

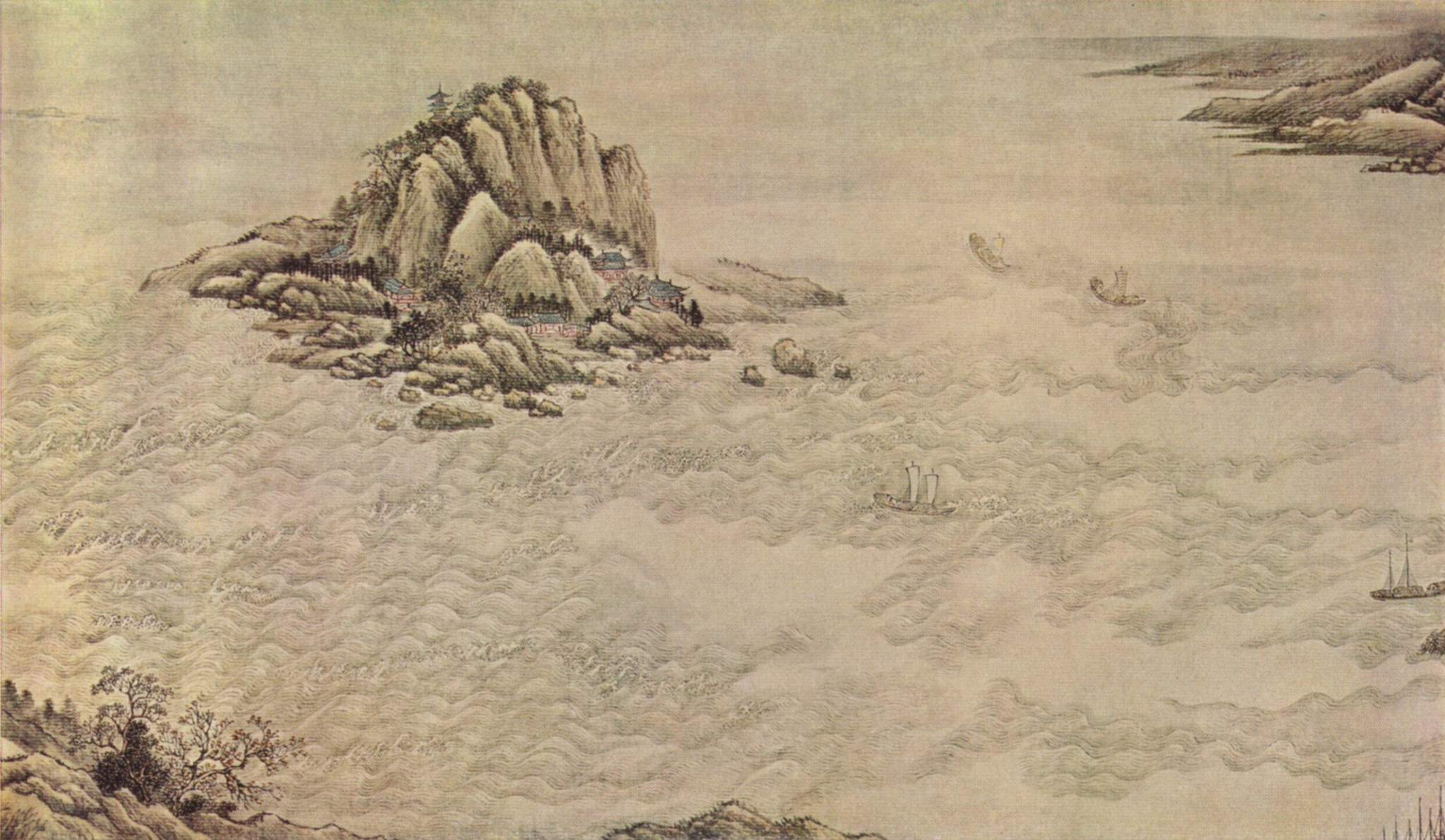
Wang Hui, Thousand miles along the Jangtse 1700

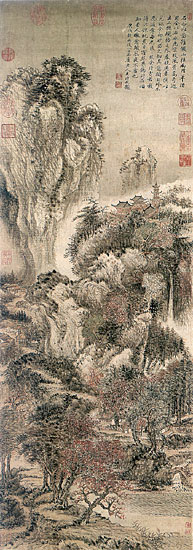
Wang Hui, Mountains, Streams, and Autumn Trees

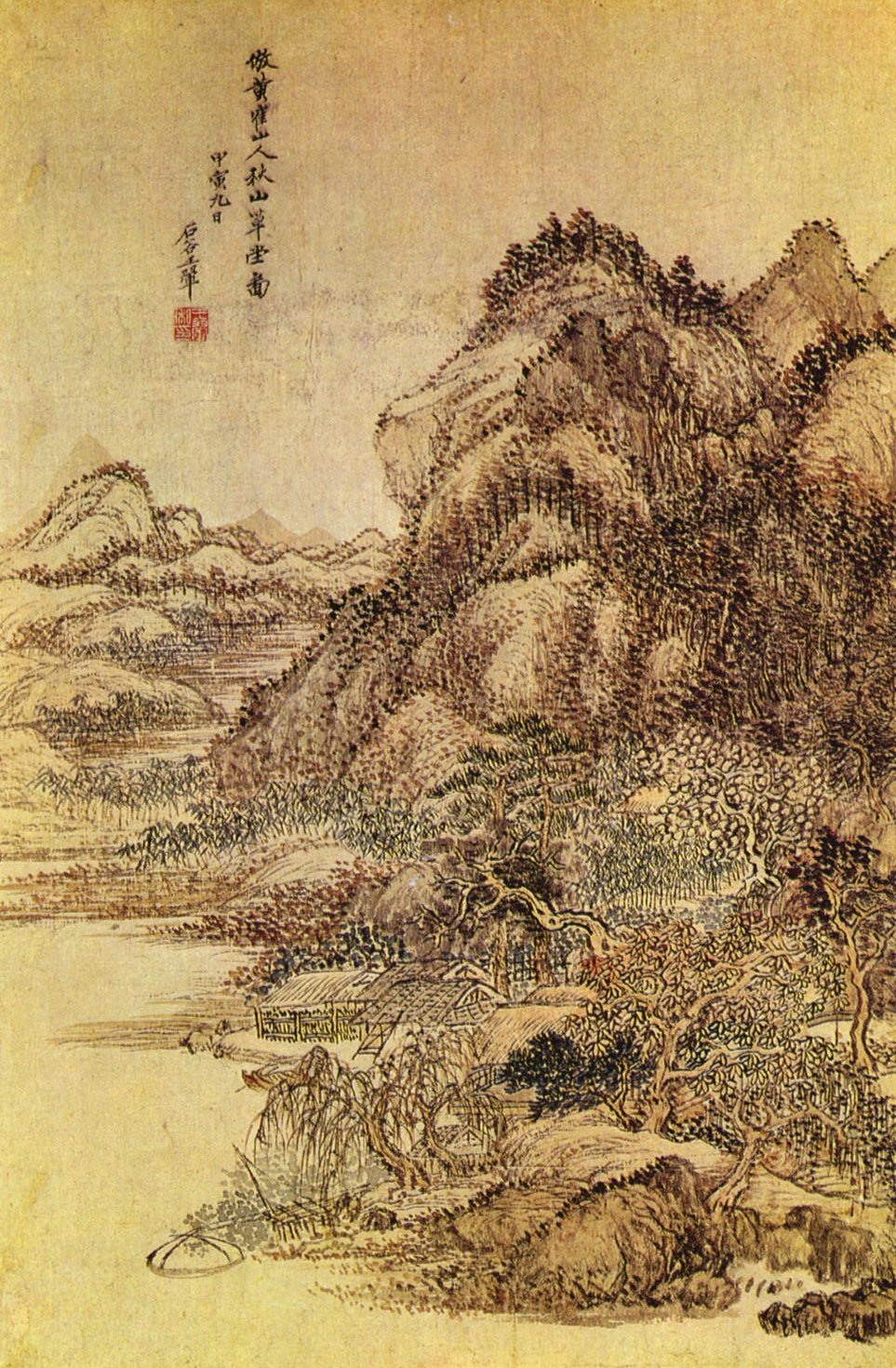
Wang Hui, Hut in the autumn rain

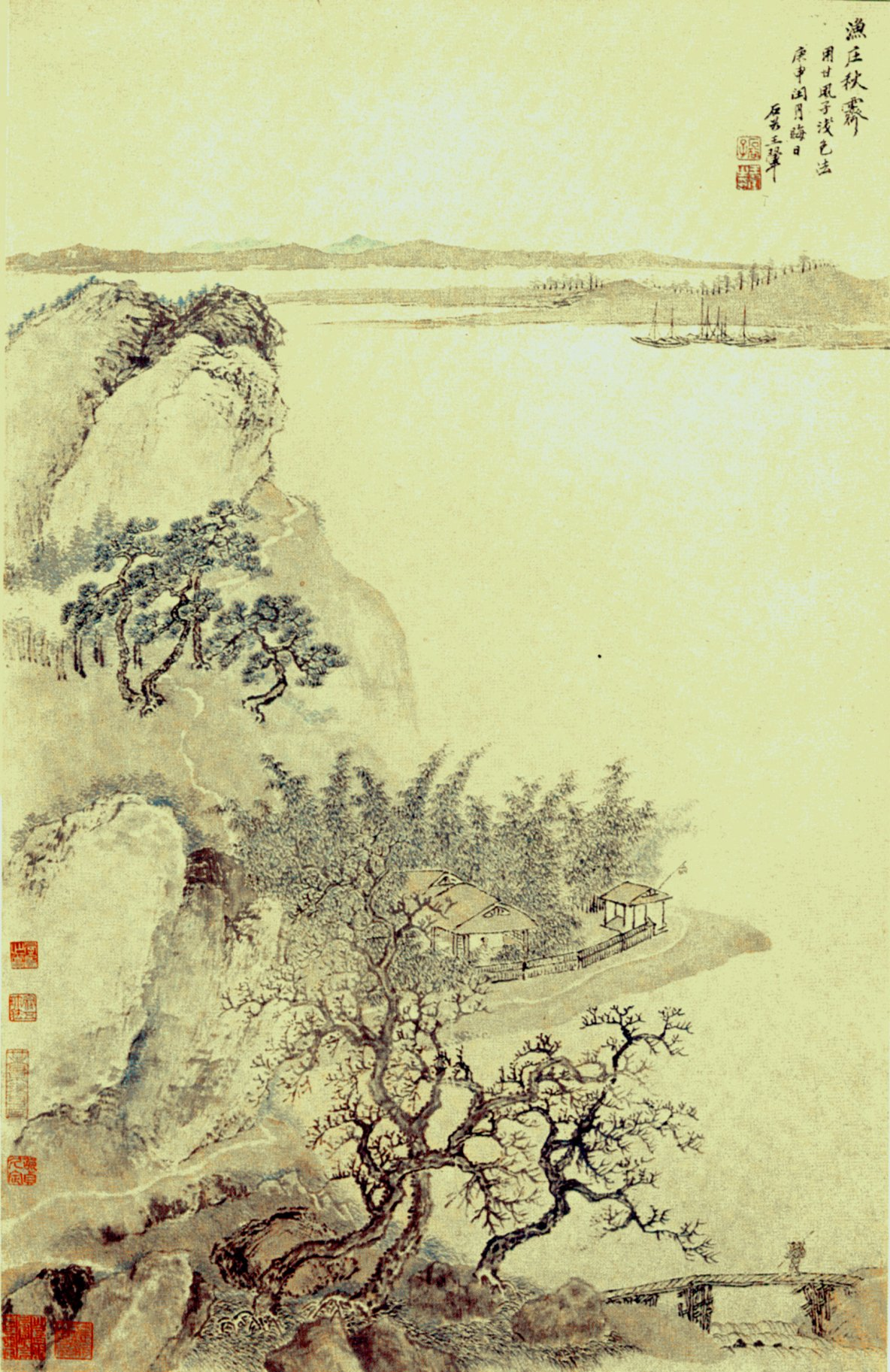
Wang Hui, Fisherman Huts and Clearing Skies in Autumn

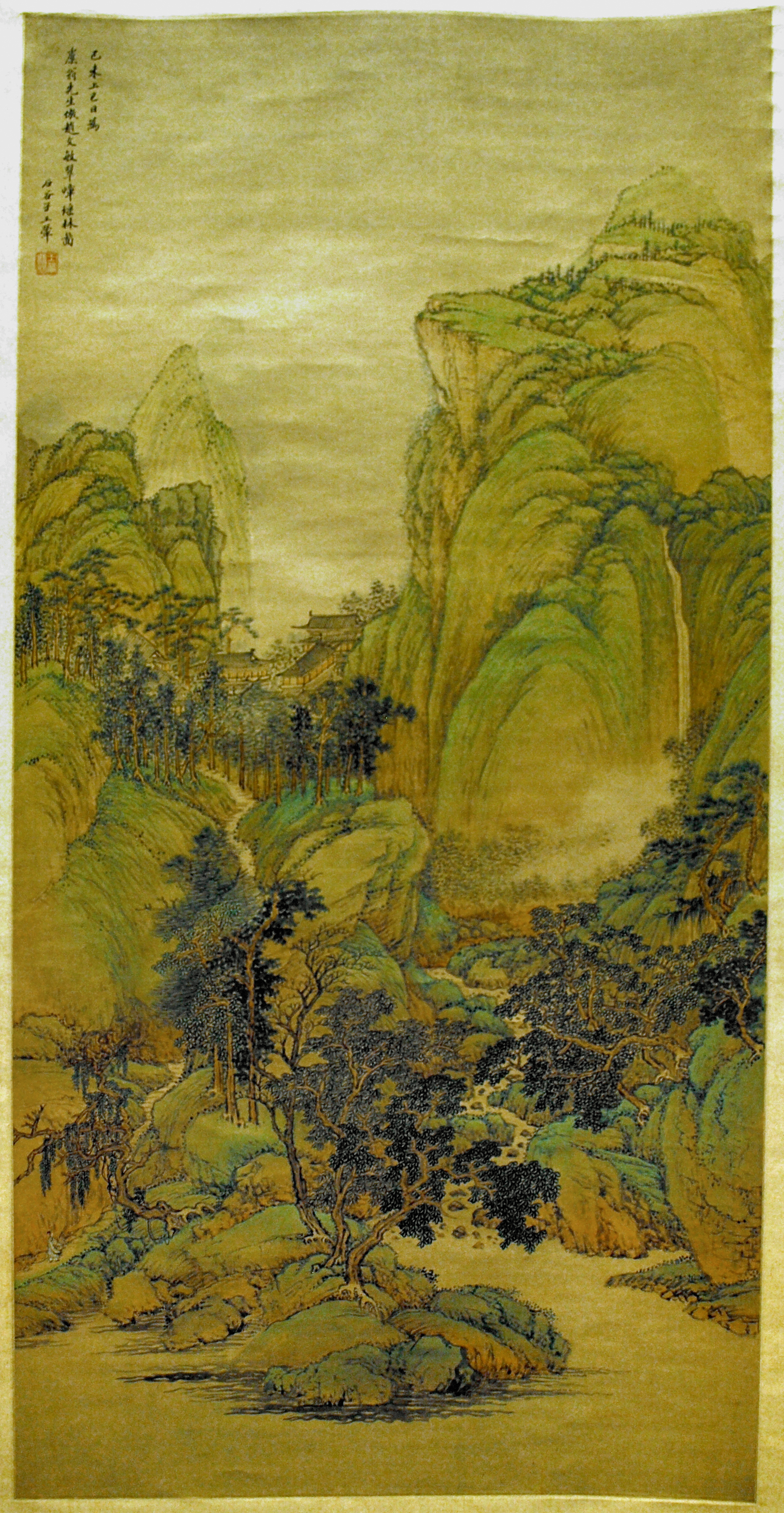
The Beauty of Green Mountains and Rivers 1679

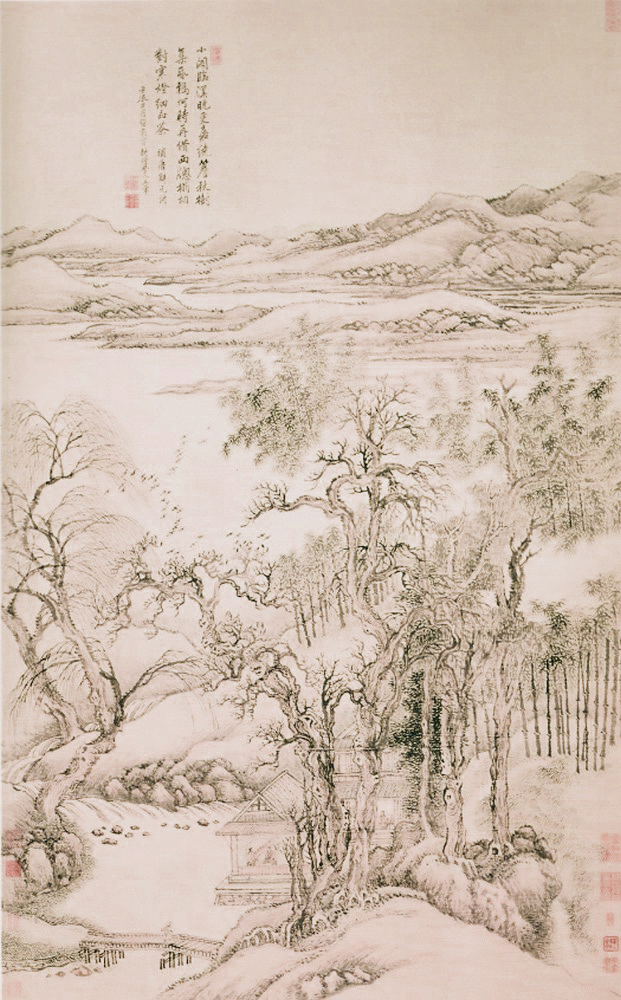
Tree in Autumn and Crows, dated 1712
