= Shan shui =

Art genre to draw landscapes

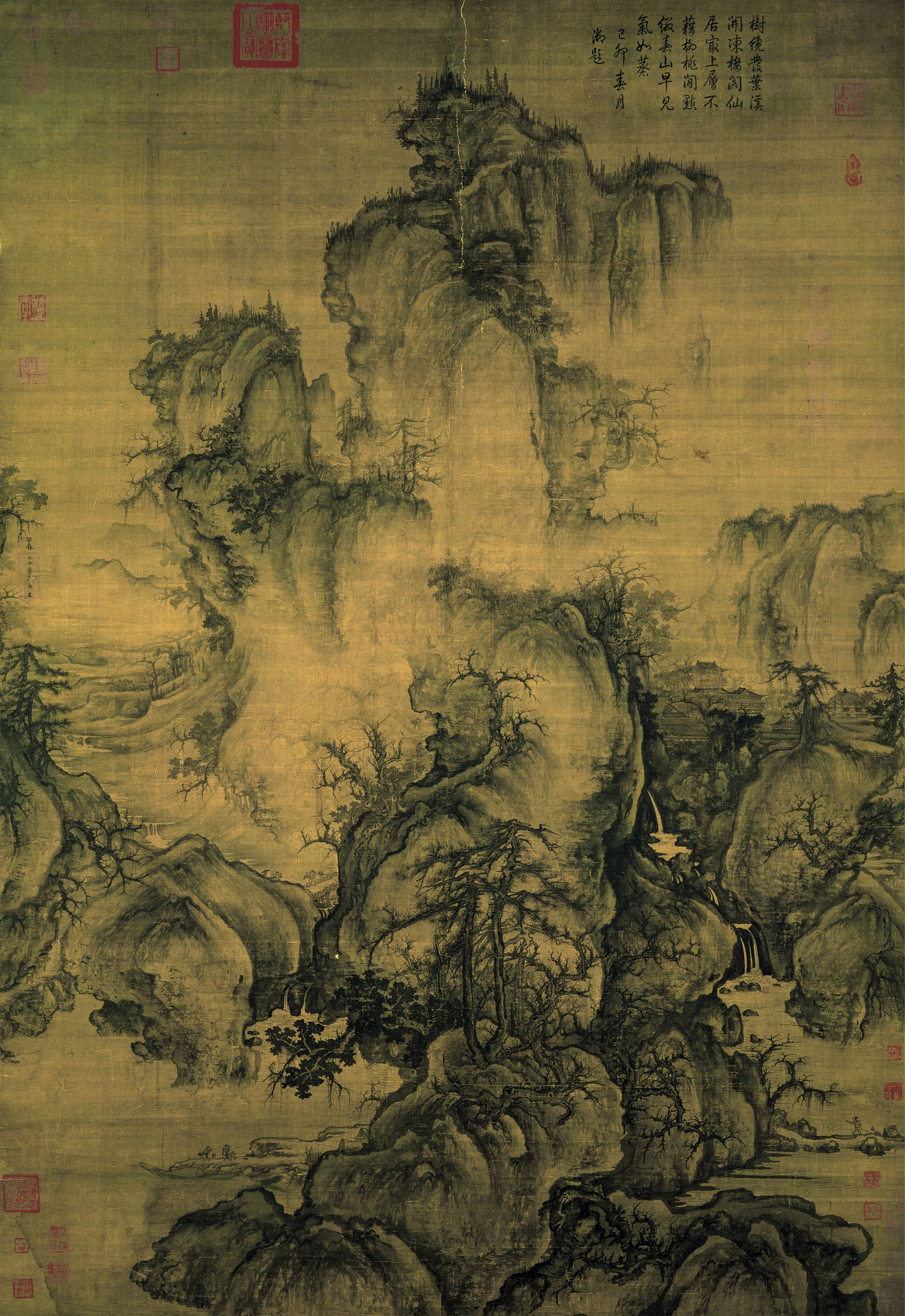
Early Spring, painted by Northern Song dynasty artist Guo Xi (c.1020 – c. 1090 AD)

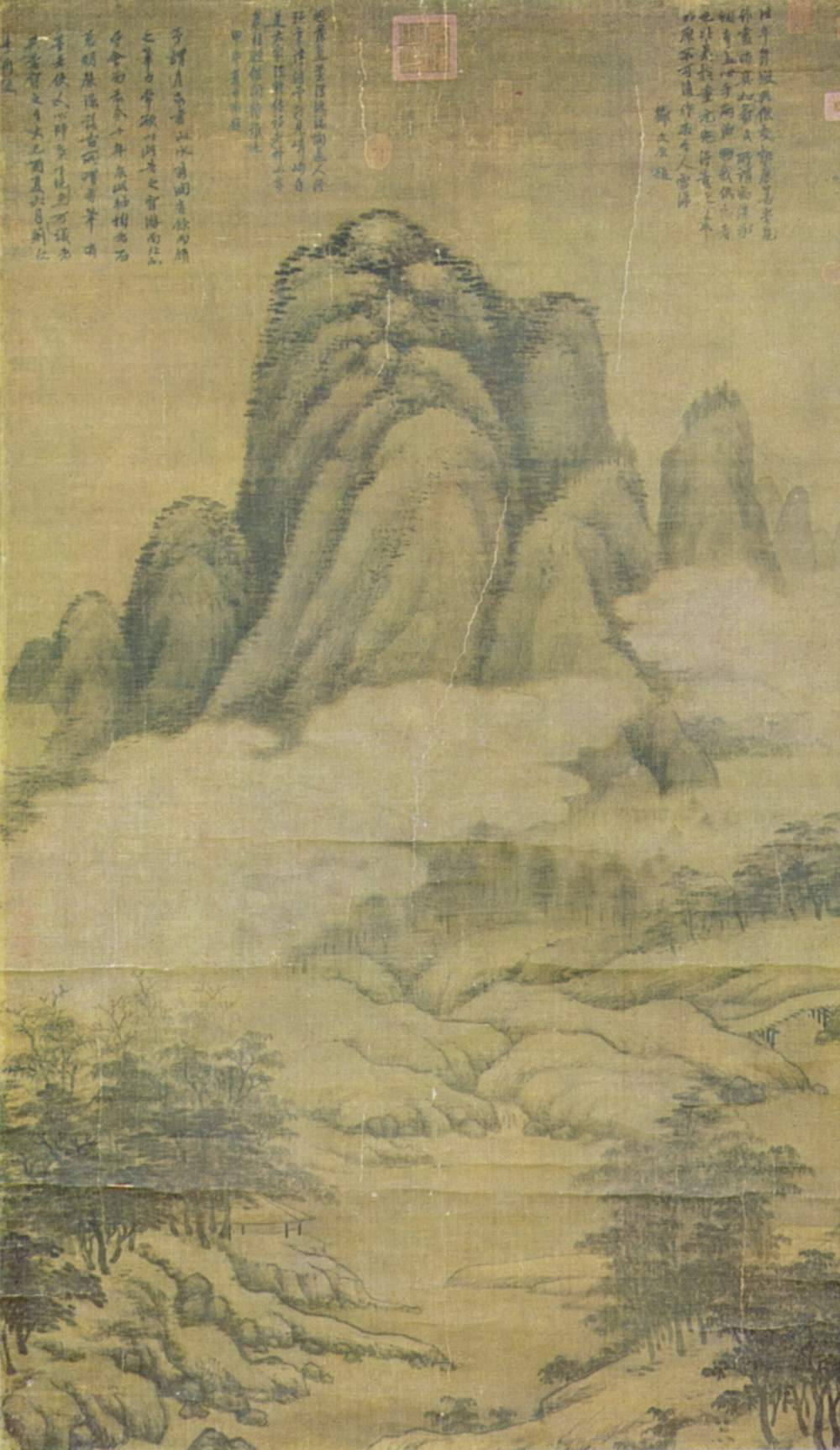
A painting by Yuan dynasty artist Gao Kegong (1248–1310)

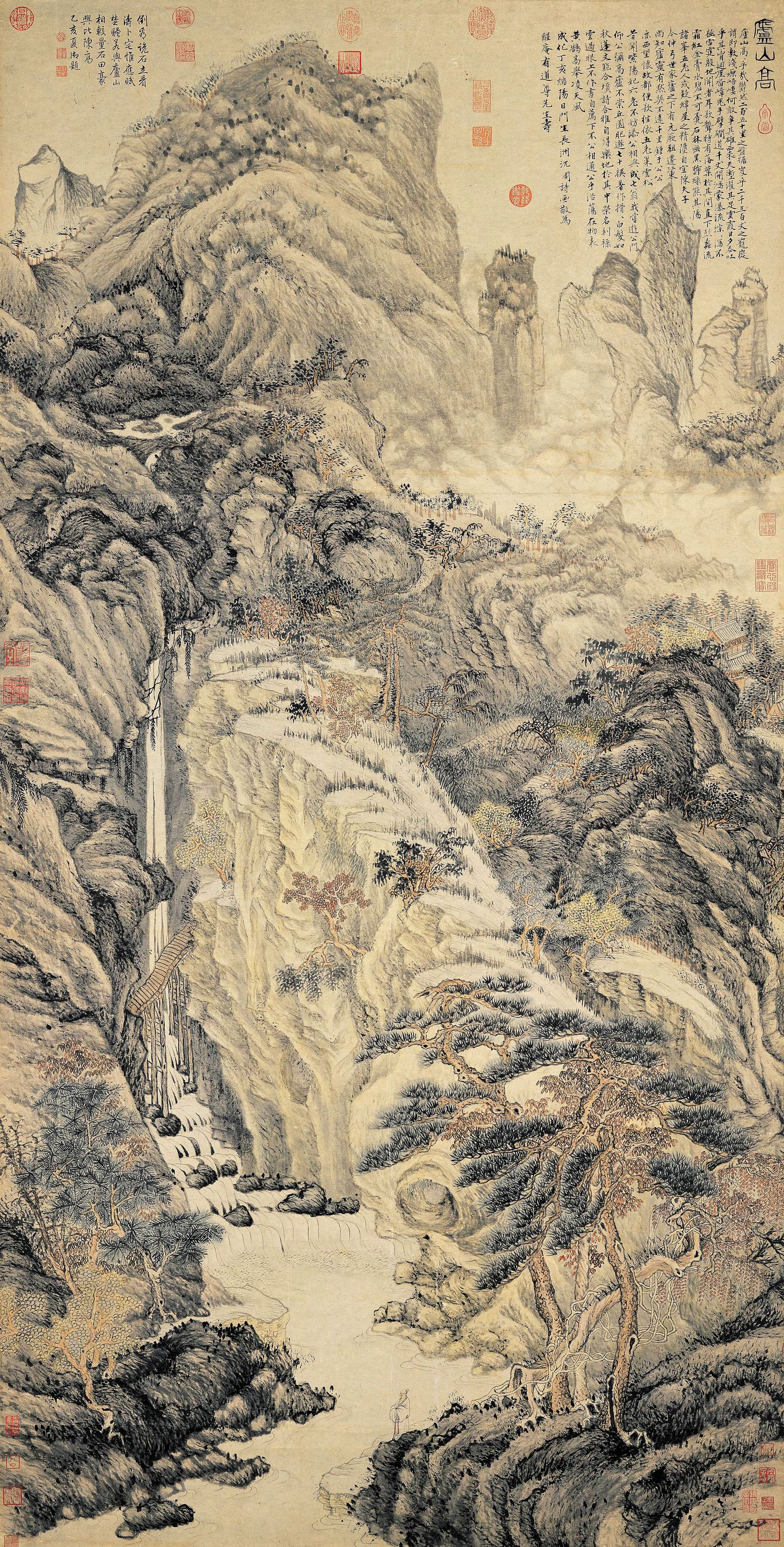
A painting by Ming dynasty artist Shen Zhou, 1467

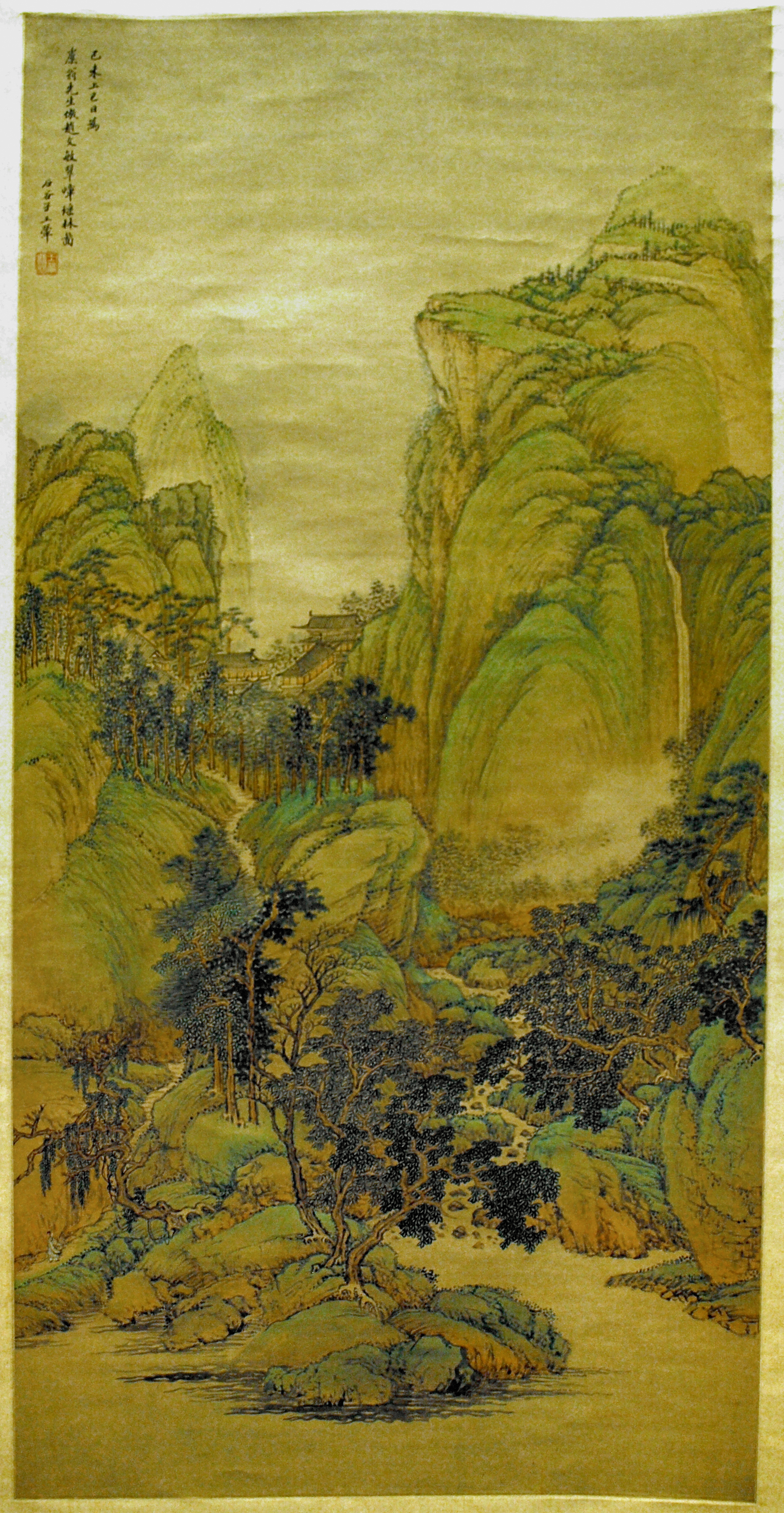
Painting by Qing dynasty artist Wang Hui, 1679

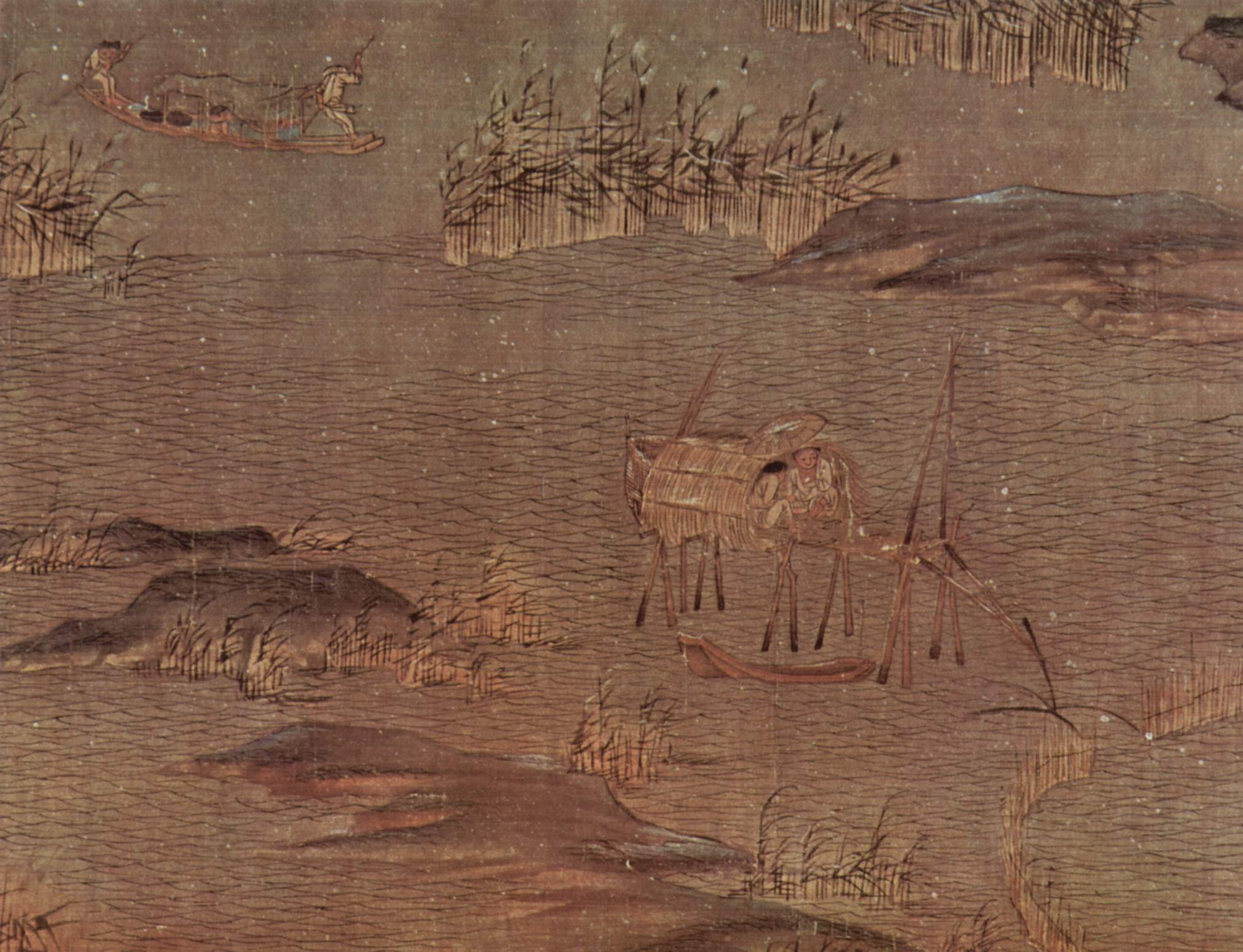
A river journey with the first snow (五代南唐 趙幹 江行初雪圖) by Chao Khan

Shan shui or shanshui (Chinese: 山水; pinyin: shān shuǐ; lit. 'mountain-water'; pronounced [ʂán ʂwèɪ]) refers to a style of traditional East Asian painting derived from Chinese painting that involves or depicts scenery or natural landscapes, using a brush and ink rather than more conventional paints. Mountains, rivers, and waterfalls are common subjects of shan shui paintings.

== History ==
Chinese landscape painting timeline

Shan shui painting first began to develop in the 5th century, in the Liu Song dynasty. It was later characterized by a group of landscape painters such as Zhang Zeduan, most of them already famous, who produced large-scale landscape paintings. These landscape paintings usually centered on mountains. Mountains had long been seen as sacred places in China, which were viewed as the homes of immortals and thus, close to the heavens. Philosophical interest in nature, or in mystical connotations of naturalism, could also have contributed to the rise of landscape painting. The art of shan shui, like many other styles of Chinese painting has a strong reference to Taoism/Daoism imagery and motifs, as symbolisms of Taoism strongly influenced "Chinese landscape painting". Some authors have suggested that Daoist stress on how minor the human presence is in the vastness of the cosmos, or Neo-Confucian interest in the patterns or principles that underlie all phenomena, natural and social lead to the highly structuralized nature of shan shui.

== Concepts ==
Most dictionaries and definitions of shan shui assume that the term includes all ancient Chinese paintings with mountain and water images. Contemporary Chinese painters, however, feel that only paintings with mountain and water images that follow specific conventions of form, style and function should be called "shan shui painting". When Chinese painters work on shan shui painting, they do not try to present an image of what they have seen in the nature, but what they have thought about nature. No one cares whether the painted colors and shapes look like the real object or not.

According to Ch'eng Hsi:

Shan shui painting is a kind of painting which goes against the common definition of what a painting is. Shan shui painting refutes color, light and shadow and personal brush work. Shan shui painting is not an open window for the viewer's eye, it is an object for the viewer's mind. Shan shui painting is more like a vehicle of philosophy.

== Compositions ==
Shan shui paintings involve a complicated and rigorous set of almost mystical requirements for balance, composition, and form. All shan shui paintings should have 3 basic components:

Paths – Pathways should never be straight. They should meander like a stream. This helps deepen the landscape by adding layers. The path can be the river, or a path along it, or the tracing of the sun through the sky over the shoulder of the mountain. The concept is to never create inorganic patterns, but instead to mimic the patterns that nature creates.

The Threshold – The path should lead to a threshold. The threshold is there to embrace you and provide a special welcome. The threshold can be the mountain, or its shadow upon the ground, or its cut into the sky. The concept is always that a mountain or its boundary must be defined clearly.

The Heart – The heart is the focal point of the painting and all elements should lead to it. The heart defines the meaning of the painting. The concept should imply that each painting has a single focal point, and that all the natural lines of the painting direct inwards to this point.

== Elements and colors ==
While many landscape paintings in China uses only ink or uses color for aesthetic purposes, some Shan shui are painted and designed in accordance with Chinese elemental theory with five elements or phases representing various parts of the natural world, and thus has specific directions for colorations that should be used in 'directions' of the painting, as to which should dominate.

Direction	Element	Colour
East	Wood	Green
South	Fire	Red
NE / SW	Earth	Tan or Yellow
West / NW	Metal	White or gold
North	Water	Blue or Black

Positive interactions between the Elements are:

- Wood produces Fire
- Fire produces Earth
- Earth produces Metal
- Metal produces Water
- Water produces Wood

Elements that react positively should be used together. For example, Water complements both Metal and Wood; therefore, a painter would combine blue and green or blue and white. There is a positive interaction between Earth and Fire, so a painter would mix Yellow and Red.

Negative interactions between the Elements are:

- Wood uproots Earth
- Earth blocks Water
- Water douses Fire
- Fire melts Metal
- Metal chops Wood

Elements that interact negatively should never be used together. For example, Fire will not interact positively with Water or Metal so a painter would not choose to mix red and blue, or red and white.

== Connection to poetry ==
A certain movement in poetry, influenced by the shan shui style, came to be known as Shanshui poetry. Sometimes, the poems were designed to be viewed with a particular work of art, others were intended to be "textual art" that invoked an image inside a reader's mind.

== Influence ==
=== Animation and film ===
The art form of shan shui has been popular to the point where a Chinese animation from 1988 entitled Feeling from Mountain and Water uses the same art style and even the term for the film's title. Additionally, many recent movies and plays produced in China, specifically House of Flying Daggers and Hero, use elements of the style itself in the sets, as well as the elemental aspects in providing "balance".

=== Construction ===
The term shan shui is sometimes extended to include gardening and landscape design, particularly within the context of feng shui.

=== Electronic Literature ===
The art form shan shui influenced the Electronic Literature work Shan Shui by Chen Qian Xun.

== See also ==
- Qinglü shanshui
- Chinese art
- Ink wash painting
- Mogu
- Wu Xing
