= Wang Shimin =

Chinese landscape painter (1592–1680)

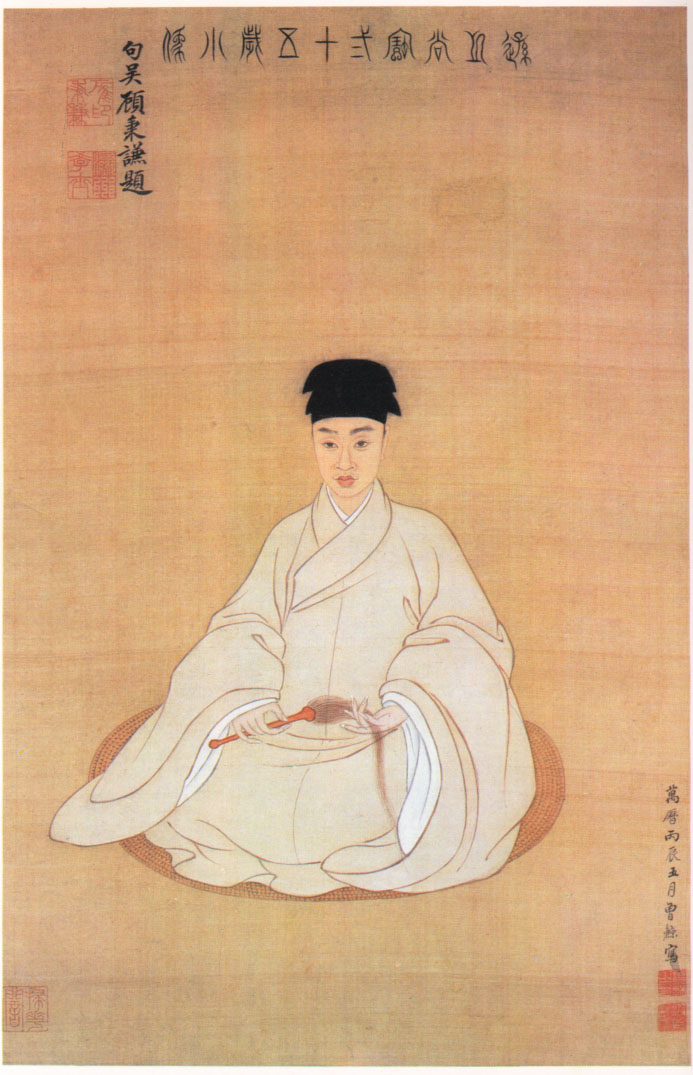
- Wang Shimin at the age of 20 by Zeng Jing
- Born: 1592; Taicang, Jiangsu, Ming dynasty
- Died: 1680 (aged 88)
- Known for: Landscape painting

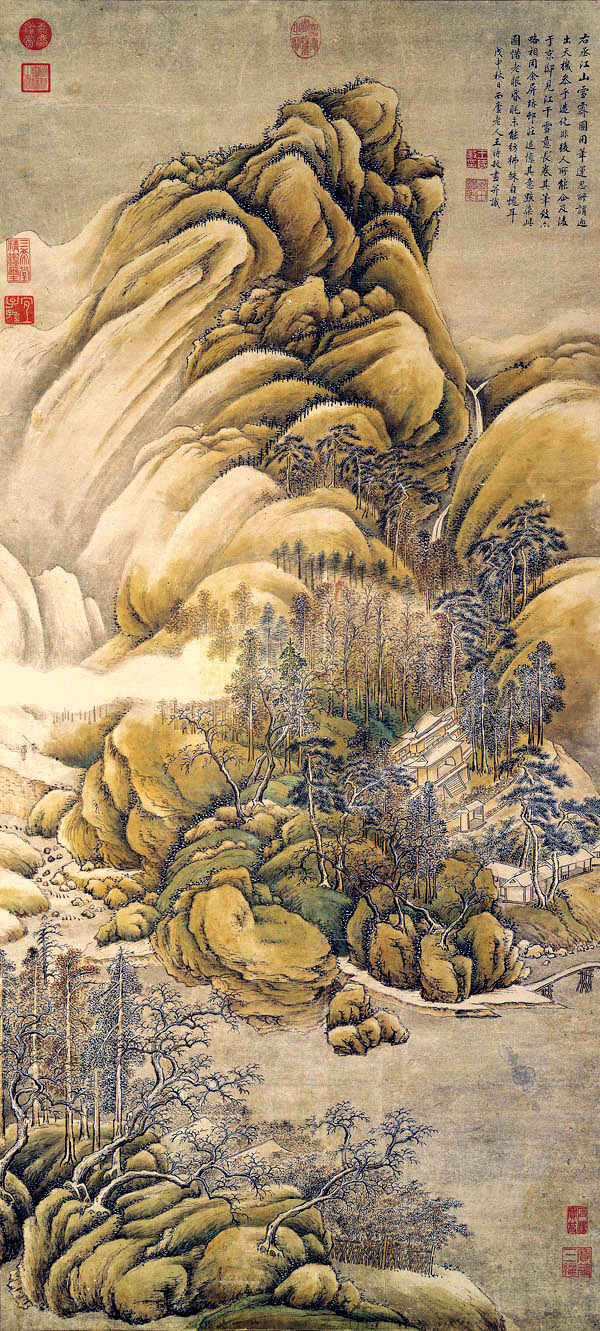
Wang Shimin, Snow Over Rivers and Mountains, 1668

Wáng Shímǐn (simplified Chinese: 王时敏; traditional Chinese: 王時敏; Wade–Giles: Wang Shih-min; c. 1592–1680) was a Chinese landscape painter during the late Ming dynasty and early Qing dynasty (1644–1911).

Born in the Jiangsu province, Wang grew up in an artistic, scholarly environment. His grandfather was a prime minister in the late Ming dynasty, and his father was a Hanlin Academy editor for the court, who had studied with Tung Ch'i-ch'ang. After learning painting and calligraphy at a young age, Wang worked as a government official. However he fell ill due to exhaustion on a trip to Nanking in 1630. Wang returned to his homeland and immersed himself in art, creating numerous works. Wang's works place him in an elevated group known as the Four Wangs, also part of the Six Masters of the early Qing period.

Wang painted After Wang Wei's "Snow Over Rivers and Mountains", which can be viewed at the National Palace Museum, Taipei.

Wang was the grandfather and tutor of Wang Yuanqi (Chinese: 王原祁; 1642–1715), who was also a notable landscape painter and a member of the Six Masters of the early Qing period.
