= List of people from Suzhou =

This is an incomplete list of notable people who were born, were raised or lived in the Chinese city of Suzhou, or for whom Suzhou is a significant part of their identity.

== List ==
Politicians

- Lu Xun (陆逊) (183–245) military general and politician of the state of Eastern Wu during the Three Kingdoms era
- Lu Kang (陆抗) (226–274) military general of the state of Eastern Wu during the Three Kingdoms era, the son of Lu Xun (Three Kingdoms)
- Lu Jianzhi (陆柬之) (585–638)
- Lu Wan (陆贽)
- Fan Zhongyan (范仲淹) (989–1052) politician and literary figure in Song dynasty
- Xu Youzhen (徐有贞) grand secretariat in Ming dynasty
- Wang ao (王鏊)
- Shen Shixing (申时行) grand secretariat in Ming dynasty
- Qu Shisi (瞿式耜) grand secretariat in Ming dynasty
- Wen Zhenmeng (文震孟)
- Weng Tonghe (翁同龢) (1830–1904) Chinese Confucian scholar and imperial tutor of the Tongzhi and Guangxu emperors in the late Qing dynasty
- Lu Runxiang (陆润庠)
- Feng Jun (冯钧)
- Yen Chia-kan (嚴家淦) (1905–1993), President (1975-1978), Republic of China
- Qian Dajun (钱大钧), General
- Jin Renqing (金人庆) Minister of Finance
- Yuan Weimin (袁伟民) Chinese sports administrator

Poets and writers

- Lu Ji (Shiheng) (陆机) (261–303) writer and literary critic of Eastern Wu during the Three Kingdoms period, the son of Lu Kang and grandson of Lu Xun (Three Kingdoms)
- Fan Chengda (范成大) (1126–1193 AD)
- Qian Qianyi (钱谦益) (1582–1664) late Ming official, scholar, poet and social historian, and along with Gong Dingzi and Wu Weiye was known as one of the Three Masters of Jiangdong (Chinese: 江左三大家)
- Shen Fu (沈復) (1763 – after 1825), courtesy name Sanbai (三白), was a Chinese writer of the Qing Dynasty, best known for his autobiography Six Records of a Floating Life.
- Ye Shengtao (叶圣陶) (1894–1988) Writer, educator and publisher
- Yu Yue (俞樾) (1821–1907)
- Yu Pingbo (俞平伯) (1900–1990) Writer, historian and critic
- Gu Jiegang (顾颉刚) (1893–1980) Historian
- Lu Wenfu(陆文夫) (1927–2005) Novelist and short story writer
- Su Tong (苏童) (b. 1963) Writer

Playwrights

- Feng Menglong (冯梦龙) (1574–1645 AD) vernacular writer and poet of the late Ming Dynasty

Artists

- Zhang Yu (张裕)
- Zhang Rong (张融)
- Zhang Xu (张旭)
- Zhang Sengyou (张僧繇) famous Chinese painter in Liang Dynasty
- Shen Zhou (沈周) Painter and poet of the Ming Dynasty, the founder of Wu School (Chinese: 吴门画派), one of Four Masters of the Ming Dynasty
- Tang Yin (唐寅) Painter, calligrapher, and poet of the Ming Dynasty, better known by his courtesy name Tang Bohu (Chinese: 唐伯虎)
- Cai Han (蔡含) Painter and calligrapher of the Qing Dynasty, known by her courtesy name Cai Nüluo
- Zhu Zhishan (祝允明) Painter, calligrapher
- Wen Zhengming (文徵明) Painter and poet of the Ming Dynasty, the founder of Wu School (Chinese: 吴门画派), one of Four Masters of the Ming Dynasty
- Wen Peng (文彭) (1498–1573 AD) Painter, the son of Wen Zhengming
- Wen Jia (文嘉) (1501–1583 AD) Painter, Calligrapher
- Cai Yu (蔡羽) (?–1541 AD) Calligrapher
- Wen Zhenheng (文震亨) (1585–1645 AD) Painter
- Kuai Xiang (蒯祥) (1397–1481 AD) Architect and Engineer who is the designer of the Forbidden City.
- I. M. Pei (贝聿铭) (1917–2019) Architect
- Xie Shichen (谢时臣) (1488–unknown) Landscape painter

Scientists and engineers

- Tsung-Dao Lee (李政道) Physicist
- Chien-Shiung Wu (吳健雄) Physicist
- Zhang Guangdou (张光斗) Expert on Water Conservancy and Hydroelectric Engineering
- Wang Ganchang (王淦昌) Physicist
- M. T. Cheng (程民德) Mathematician
- An Wang (王安) Computer Engineer and Inventor
- Feng Duan (冯端) Physicist
- Yang Jiachi (杨嘉墀) Space Automatic Control Scientist
- Cheng Kaijia (程开甲) Physicist
- Lee C. Lee Professor of psychology and Asian-American studies
- Pan Chengdong (潘承洞) Mathematician
- Thomas Dao (1921–2009), physician who developed breast cancer treatment alternatives.
- Fei Xiaotong (费孝通) Social Scientist
- Huston Smith Religious studies scholar

Philosophers

- Gu Yanwu (顾炎武)
- Zhang Taiyan (章太炎)
- Nan Huai-Chin (南懷瑾) Chan Buddhist teacher

Entertainment

- Fei Mu (费穆) Movie director
- Wu Yonggang (吴永刚) Movie director
- Josephine Siao (萧芳芳) Actress
- Xia Meng (夏梦) Actress
- Carina Lau (刘嘉玲) Actress
- Li Shaohong (李少红) Movie director
- Angela Pan Actress

Others

- Huang Peilie (黄丕烈) Bibliophile
- Zhu Xun, Chinese host
- Sun Tzu (孙武), Military General who wrote The Art of War (birthplace disputed)
- Lin Zhao (林昭), Dissident
- Rose Chan (陈惠珍), Cabaret dancer and stripper
- Wang Shixian (王适娴), Chinese female badminton player
- Fei Junlong (费俊龙), Chinese astronaut who flew on Shenzhou 6
- Ru Long (汝龍), translator and professor
