= Fish-Scale Registers =

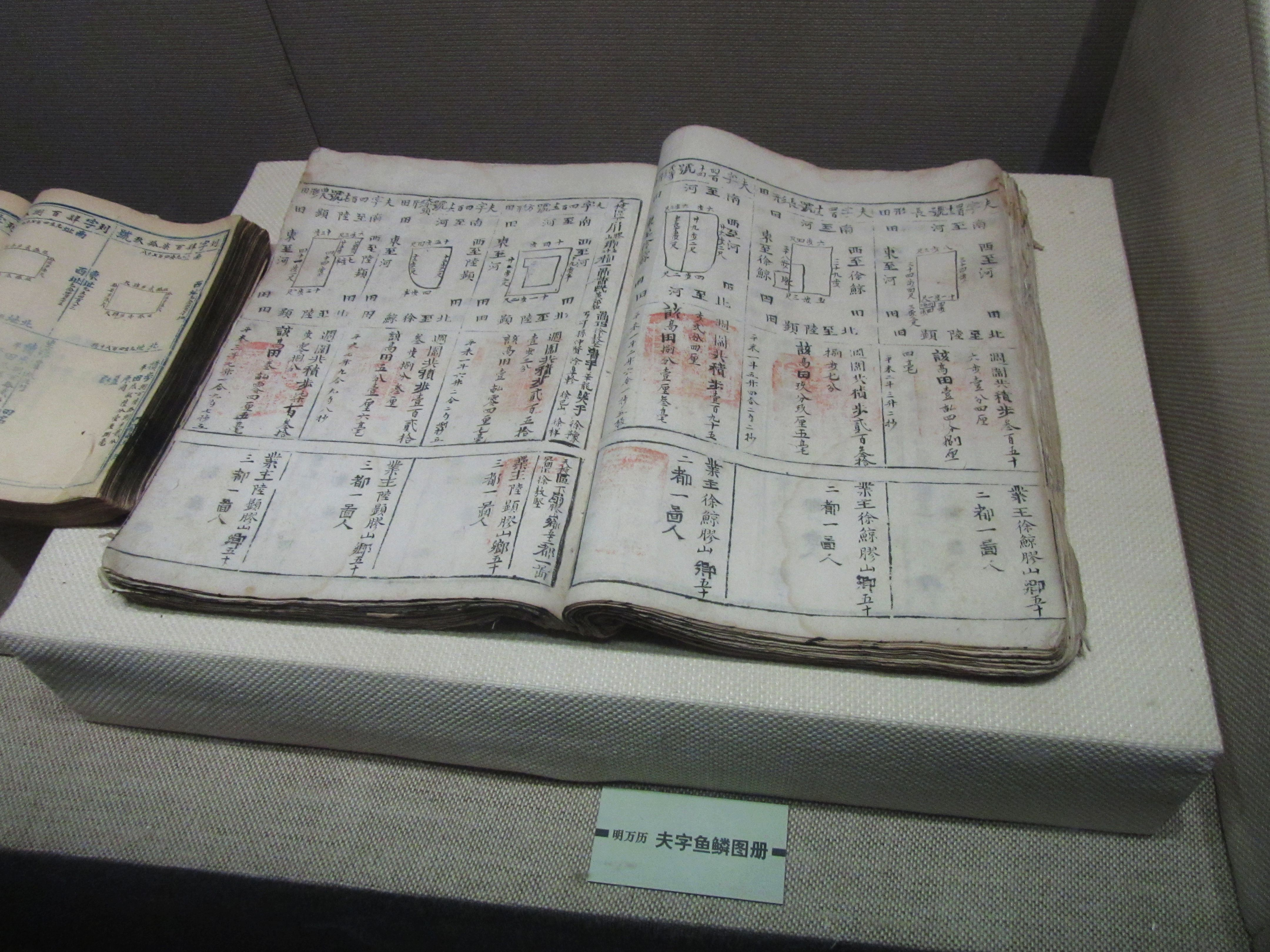
A sample of the Fish-Scale Map Registers from the Wanli era, preserved in the museum in Wuxi.

The Fish-Scale Registers, (Note: simplified Chinese: 鱼鳞图册; traditional Chinese: 魚鱗圖冊; pinyin: Yúlín túcè) also known as the Fish-Scale Maps, and the Fish-Scale Map Registers, were utilized in China to document landholdings and serve as a foundation for tax records. These collections of cadastral maps were first documented in the 12th century, became widespread during the Ming dynasty, and continued to hold significance until the 20th century.

== History ==
The Fish-Scale Map Registers were named for their resemblance to fish skin covered with scales, with square field plots representing each plot of land. This term was already in use by the end of the 12th century, with the oldest known examples found in Fujian. The maps were also used during the Yuan period.

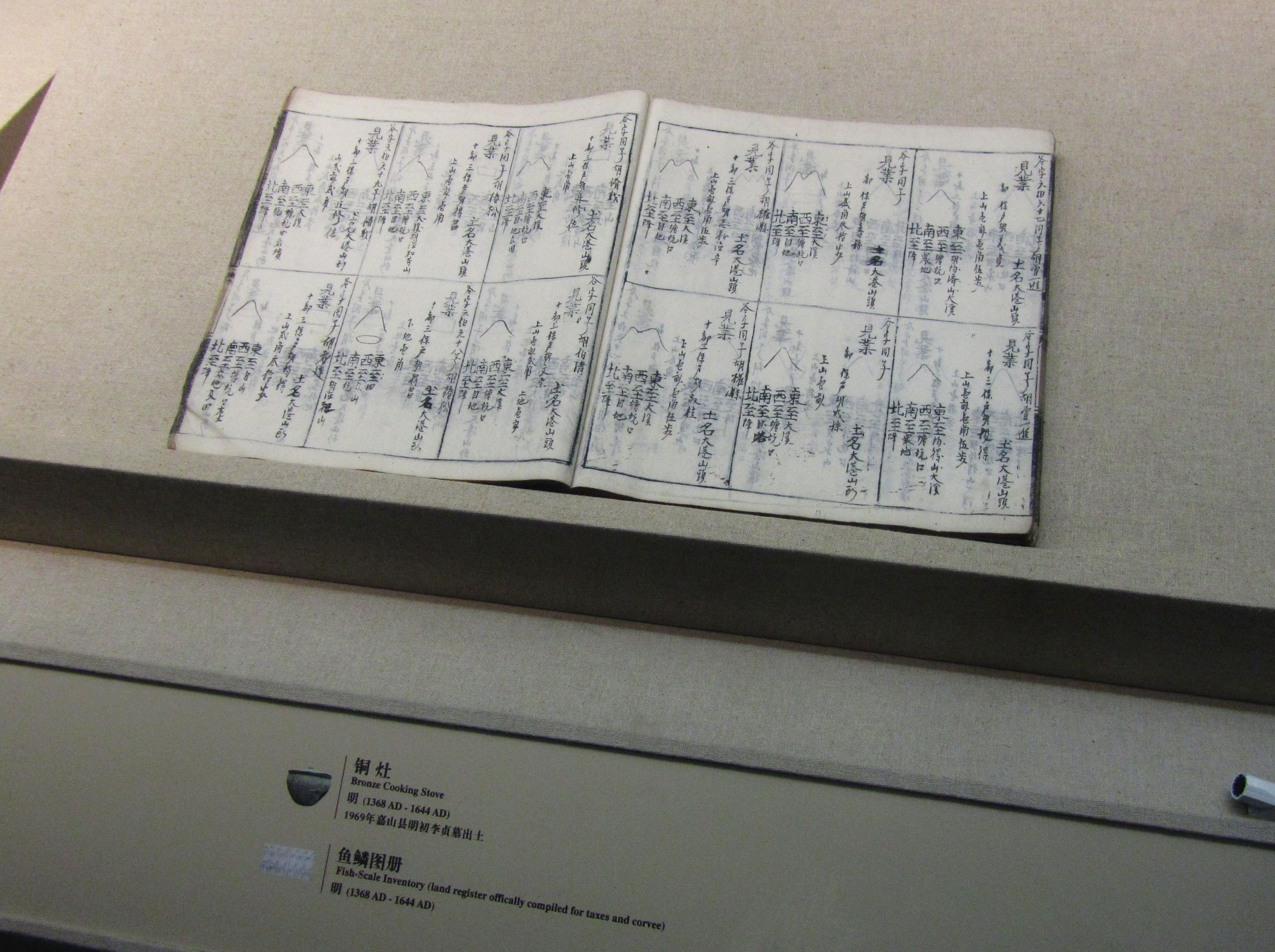
A sample of the Fish-Scale Map Registers

During the Ming dynasty, the Fish-Scale Maps were regularly updated and expanded. For example, in 1368, students from the Imperial University were sent to western Zhejiang to update the maps. A nationwide update of cadastral records was also carried out in 1387. Alongside the Yellow Registers, the fish-scale maps were one of the two main records of property ownership in the empire. These maps recorded all the land owned by a village, including the owner's name, plot dimensions, and area. The land was classified into four categories: irrigated fields (tian), dry fields (di), mountains and hills (shan), and wetlands (tang). Some authors even further divided these categories into subcategories. The Fish-Scale Maps could not be used to calculate a taxpayer's levy, as individuals may own land in multiple locations. Instead, taxes were determined using the Yellow Registers (or their replacements in the late Ming and Qing periods), which provided information on the total land holdings of each household. This weakened connection between taxation and the cadastre also reduced the motivation for landowners to leave plots unregistered. Additionally, the Yellow Registers were filled out by village elders, while the Fish-Scale Maps were compiled by government personnel conducting cadastral surveys in the field.

The registers included a map of each individual plot as well as an overall map of all land belonging to the village. This made it difficult to omit or distort the size of a single field, as it would create inconsistencies in the map or neighboring plots. Accurate documentation was also important to landowners because certificates of ownership were issued based on the Fish-Scale Map Registers, which held significant weight in potential land disputes. Therefore, the Fish-Scale Map Registers were considered more reliable and precise than tax records, such as the Yellow Registers.

The accuracy of the registers gradually declined over time. In 1581, Grand Secretary Zhang Juzheng, the head of the government, recognized this problem and initiated the creation of a new cadastre. This cadastre, which was not surpassed in detail until modern times, served as the basis for later Ming and Qing cadastral records. The procedures for surveying and compiling the registers were carefully tested before the project was officially launched on 16 December 1580. Specially trained personnel were hired and paid in advance to carry out the work in 1581–1582. The compilers were required to sign their sheets and any falsification of data was strictly punished. The fields were surveyed, boundaries were marked, sizes were calculated, and the owners and tenants were recorded. Zhang died before the nationwide consolidation of the data could be completed, but the project still achieved its purpose at the local level.
