= Four Scholars in Wuzhong =

The "Four Scholars in Wuzhong," also known as the "Four Literary Masters of the Wuzhong Region", the "Four Talents of Wuzhong," the "Four Talents of Wu", the "Four Talents of Wumen," the "Four Talents of Jiangnan, the "Four Great Talents of Jiangnan" or the "Four Talents of Suzhou," are four outstanding figures from the Wuzhong region (now Suzhou, Jiangsu) during the Ming Dynasty. They are: Zhu Yunming, Tang Yin, Wen Zhengming, and Xu Zhenqing.

== Zhu Yunming ==
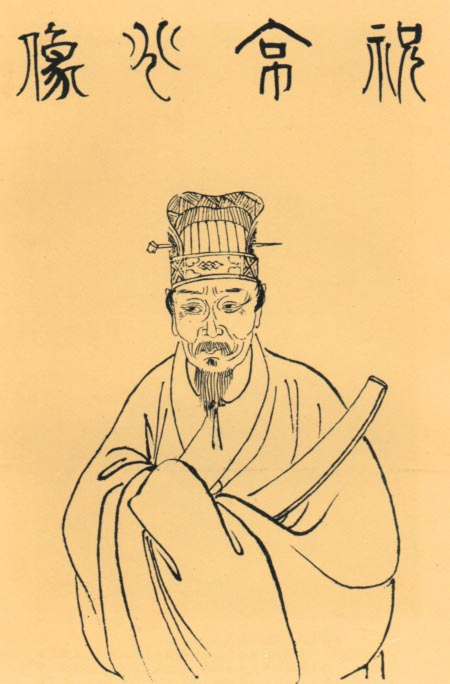
Portrait of Zhu Yunming (祝允明), from the Qing Dynasty edition of Wu Jun Mingxian Picture Biography(吴郡名贤图传赞), compiled by Gu Yuan(顾沅) and illustrated by Kong Jiyao(孔继尧).

Zhu Yunming (1460–1527) was a calligrapher of the Ming Dynasty, renowned for his mastery in both small standard script (xiaokai) and wild-cursive script (kuangcao). Born in 1461 in Changzhou County, modern Suzhou, Jiangsu Province, Zhu came from a prestigious family of scholars and officials spanning seven generations. His courtesy name was Xizhe (希哲), and his art name was Zhishan (枝山).

Born with a supernumerary thumb on one hand, Zhu gave himself the sobriquet "Zhizhi Scholar" (枝指生; zhizhi refers to preaxial polydactyly in Chinese). Demonstrating exceptional talent and diligence from a young age, he was said to have written large characters by the age of five and composed poetry by the age of nine.

At 16, Zhu became a certified student, and in 1492, he passed the provincial examination. However, he never succeeded in the metropolitan examinations. At 32, he began his official career, serving as the county magistrate of Xingning, Guangdong, in 1514. During his tenure, he compiled the Gazetteer of Xingning County. In 1521, Zhu was promoted to Controller-General of Yingtian Prefecture (modern Nanjing), but he resigned within a year due to illness. Disillusioned with governmental corruption, he spent the remainder of his life writing and socializing with friends in Suzhou. He died in 1527.

Together with Tang Yin, Wen Zhengming and Xu Zhenqing, Zhu was one of the "Four Talents of Wu (Suzhou)" (吴中四才子), his calligraphy is the most noted in the quartet. He excelled at small standard script (xiaokai), but was of wild-cursive (kuangcao) fame. His friends attributed his affinity for this highly expressive calligraphy to his impetuous personality.

Zhu was also known as an unorthodox thinker against Neo-Confucianism. In his later life, he described himself as a "wild man". He finished various collections of miscellaneous notes. Some scholars believe that his work of judgements on historical personalities influenced Li Zhi's Cang Shu.

== Tang Yin ==
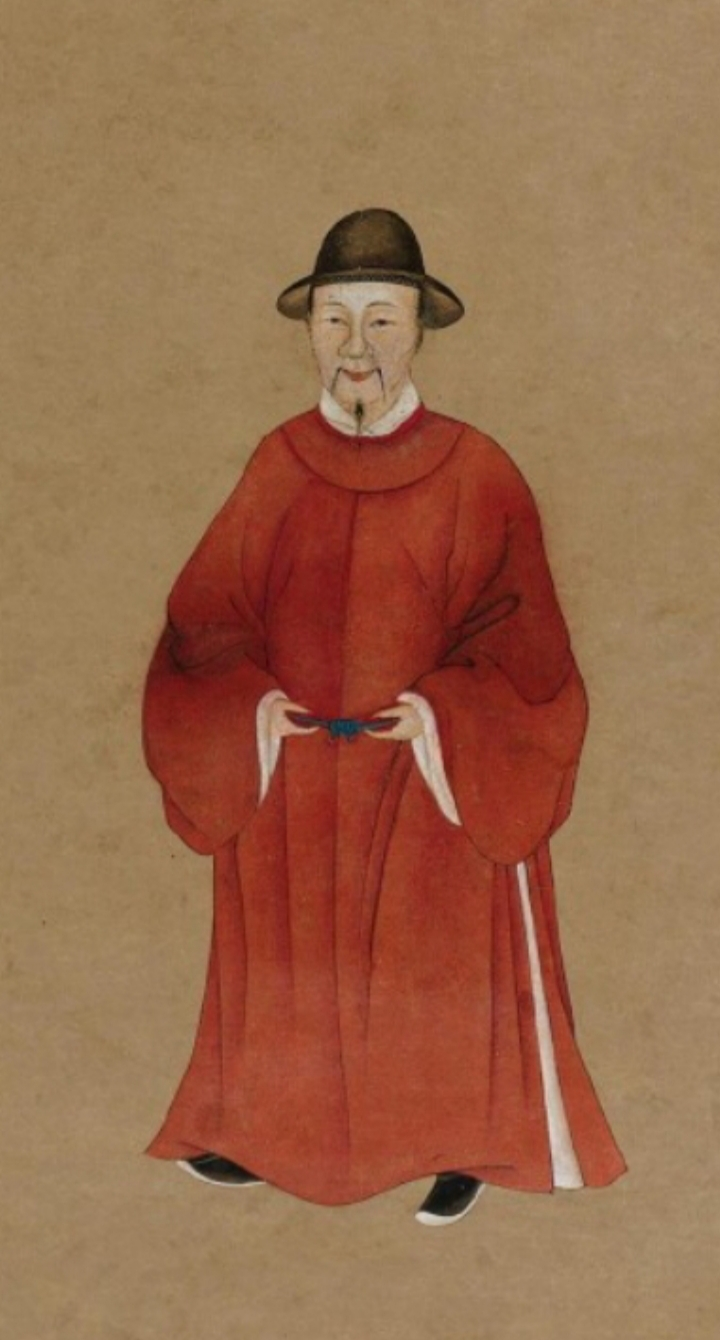
The Portrait of Tang Bohu(唐伯虎) by Zhang Ling(张灵)during the Ming Dynasty.

Tang Yin (1470–1523), courtesy name Bohu(伯虎) and Ziwei(子畏), with various pseudonyms such as Liuru Jushi, Taohua Anzhu, and Luguo Tang Sheng, was a renowned figure of the Ming Dynasty. He is famously known as the "Most Charming Talent of Jiangnan" and was a distinguished calligrapher, painter, and literary figure from Suzhou. He was considered one of the "Four Great Talents of Jiangnan" (also known as the "Four Talents of Wumen") alongside Wen Zhengming, Zhu Yunming, and Xu Zhenqing, and is regarded as the foremost among them.

Tang emerged from the vital merchant class of Suzhou, at a very low economic level of the son of a restaurant operator. Contrary to some accounts, he seems to have studied assiduously during his youth, paying little attention to material gains. His genius, which would later gain him renown as the supreme talent of the Jiangnan area (Southern China), soon drew him into the wealthy, powerful, and talented social circles of Suzhou. Wen Zhengming became his friend; Wen's father, Wen Lin (1445–99), acted as something of a patron, making the right connections for him.

He was a brilliant student and later became the protégé of Wen Lin. His friends in the Suzhou scholarly circles included Shen Zhou, Wu kuan (1436–1504) and Zhu Yunming. In 1498 Tang Yin came first in the provincial examinations in Nanjing, the second stage in the Imperial examination ladder. The following year he went to the capital to sit in the national examinations, but he and his friend Xu Jing (?–1507) were accused of bribing the servant of one of the chief examiners to give them the examination questions in advance. All parties were jailed, and Tang Yin returned to Suzhou in disgrace, his high hopes for a distinguished civil service career dashed forever.

Denied further official progress, he pursued a life of pleasure and earned a living by selling his paintings. That mode of living brought him into disrepute with a later generation of artist-critics (for example, Dong Qichang) who felt that financial independence was vital to enable an artist to follow his own style and inspiration. While Tang is associated with paintings of feminine beauty, his paintings (especially landscapes) otherwise exhibit the same variety and expression of his peers and reveal a man of both artistic skill and profound insight.

== Wen Zhengming ==
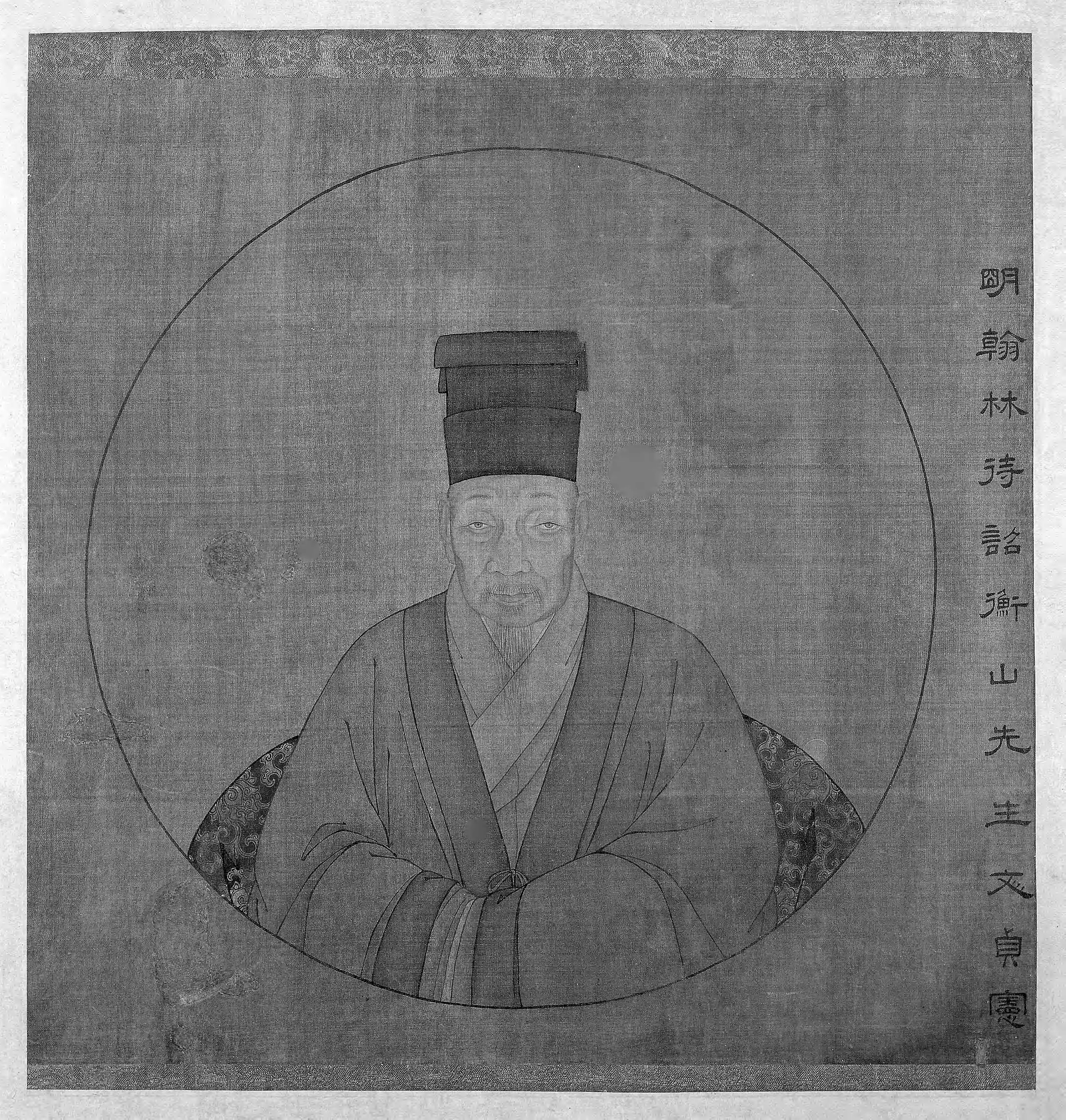
Portrait of the Ming Dynasty scholar and artist Wen Zhengming (文徵明).

Wen Zhengming (28 November 1470 – 28 March 1559), born Wen Bi, was a Chinese painter, calligrapher, and poet during the Ming dynasty. He was regarded as one of the Four Masters of Ming painting.

Wen Zhengming was born Wen Bi near present-day Suzhou on 28 November 1470. He would later be known by his courtesy name, Zhengming. He had an elder brother, Wen Gui, who was born in 1469. When Zhengming was two years old, his father, Wen Lin, passed the imperial examination with the highest possible rank, jinshi. Wen Lin was assigned a government position as a magistrate in Yongjia County in Zhejiang province, and left for his job, leaving his two sons in the care of his wife, Qi Shenning. In 1476, Qi died of an illness at the age of 32. Wen Lin commissioned the noted scholar Li Dongyang to write an inscription for her tomb.

Wen Zhengming's family was originally from a line of military men who lived in Hengshan County, Hunan province. At the time of his great-great-grandfather Wen Dingcong, the family moved to the city of Changzhou in the Suzhou area. Zhengming was a distant relative of the Song dynasty official Wen Tianxiang, through an ancestor who lived in Hengshan. From this he derived his hao (art name), Hengshan, which he used to sign many of his works. His father Wen Lin and his grandfather Wen Hong (Gongda) were both interested in painting. Wen Lin was also a patron of Tang Yin, Wen Zhengming's contemporary and fellow member of the "Four Masters of the Ming dynasty".

In 1489, Wen Zhengming began studying under Shen Zhou, the eldest of the Four Masters and founder of the Wu school of painting, of which Wen himself later became a leading figure. Zhengming's father Wen Lin died in 1499, while working as prefect of Wenzhou. At Zhengming's request, Shen Zhou provided a written account of Wen Lin's life for the funeral.

Wen Zhengming married the daughter of a high-ranking official and jinshi named Wu Yu around the year 1490. Her uncle was the artist Xia Chang, whose paintings of bamboo may have influenced Wen's own work. Little is known about Wen's wife herself, whose personal name was not recorded. After she died in 1542, Wen painted Wintry Trees after Li Cheng for a guest who arrived with a gift to mourn her death.

Around 1509–1513, Wang Xianchen, a friend of the Wen family, began construction on the Humble Administrator's Garden, generally considered one of China's greatest classical gardens. The garden is the subject of some of Wen Zhengming's poems and paintings, including an album of thirty-one views painted in 1535 and a second of eight views in 1551.

Wen Zhengming died in 1559, making him the longest-living member of the "Four Talents of Wumen."

== Xu Zhenqing ==
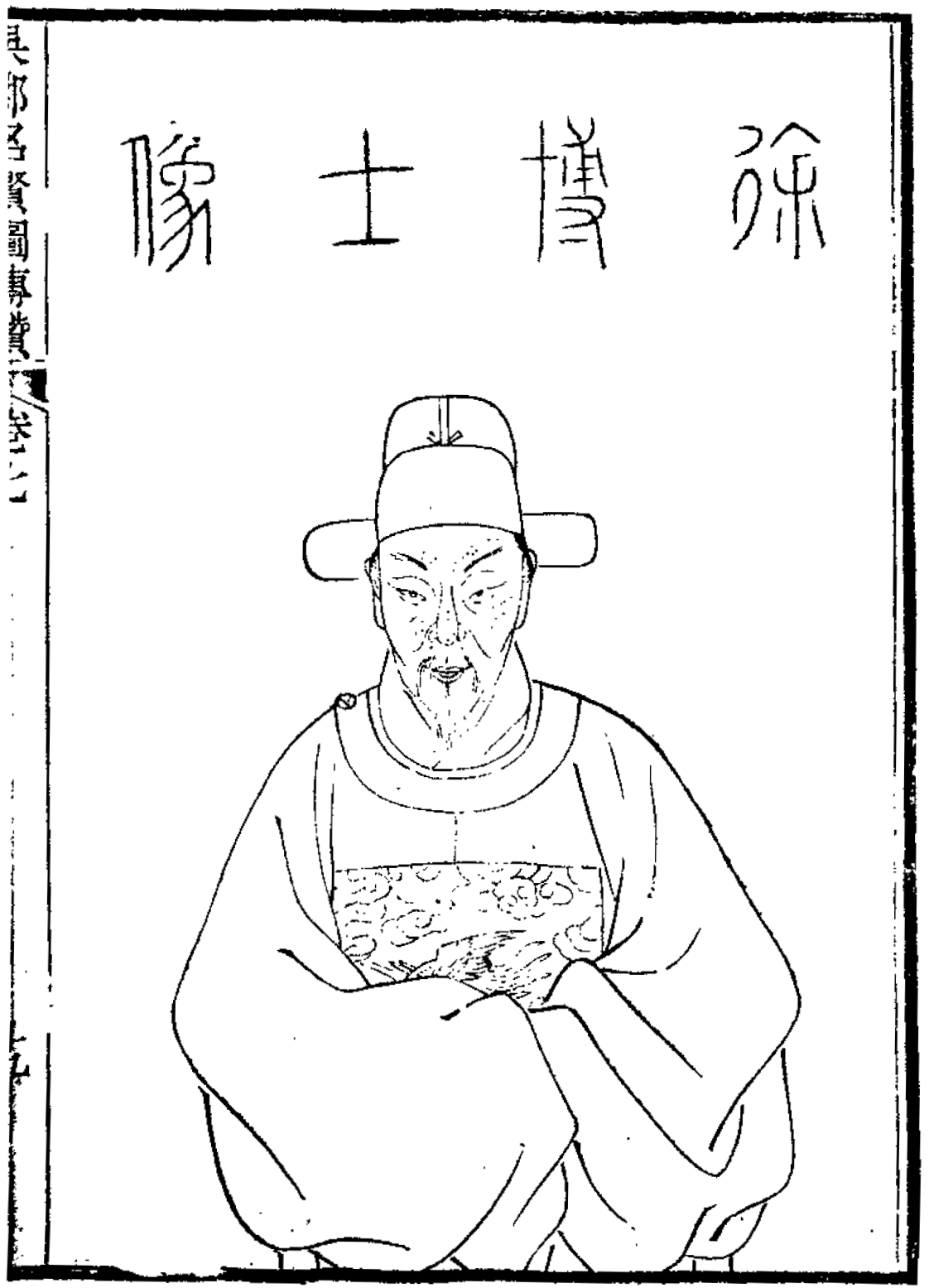
Portrait of Xu Zhenqing (徐禎卿), from the Qing Dynasty edition of Wu Jun Mingxian Picture Biography Volume 7,by Gu Yuan(顾沅)

Xu Zhenqing (1479–1511), courtesy names Changgu(昌榖) and Changguo(昌国), was a renowned Ming dynasty literary figure from Meili Town in Changshu, later relocating to Wuxian (modern Suzhou). He was one of the "Four Talents of Jiangnan" (also known as the "Four Talents of Wumen"), alongside Tang Yin, Zhu Yunming, and Wen Zhengming.

Xu Zhenqing was highly intelligent and knowledgeable, despite his family not having any books. Even when he was still a student, he was proficient in poetry and had a good relationship with his fellow townsman, Tang Yin, who introduced him to Shen Zhou and Yang Xunji, leading to his reputation.

In 1505, he passed the imperial examination and became a jinshi. During the reign of Emperor Xianzong of Ming, an eunuch was sent to inquire about the names of Xu Zhenqing and Lu Shen. Lu Shen was selected for an official position, but Xu Zhenqing was not chosen due to his appearance. He was appointed as the vice director of the Left Division of the Dali Court, but after being implicated in a prisoner case, he was demoted to a doctorate at the Imperial Academy.

In March 1511, Xu Zhenqing died at the age of 33.

== Works cited ==
- Cai, Yanxin (2011). Chinese Architecture. Cambridge University Press. ISBN 978-0521186445.
- Chang, Kang-i Sun; Owen, Stephen, eds. (2010). The Cambridge History of Chinese Literature: From 1375. Cambridge University Press. ISBN 978-0521855594.
- Clunas, Craig (2004). Elegant Debts: The Social Art of Wen Zhengming, 1470-1559. University of Hawaii Press. ISBN 0824827724.
- Clunas, Craig (2013). Fruitful Sites: Garden Culture in Ming Dynasty China. Reaktion Books. ISBN 978-1780231587.
- Watson, William (2000). The Arts of China: 900-1620. Yale University Press. ISBN 0300098359.
