= Tang Yin =

Chinese painter and poet (1470–1524)

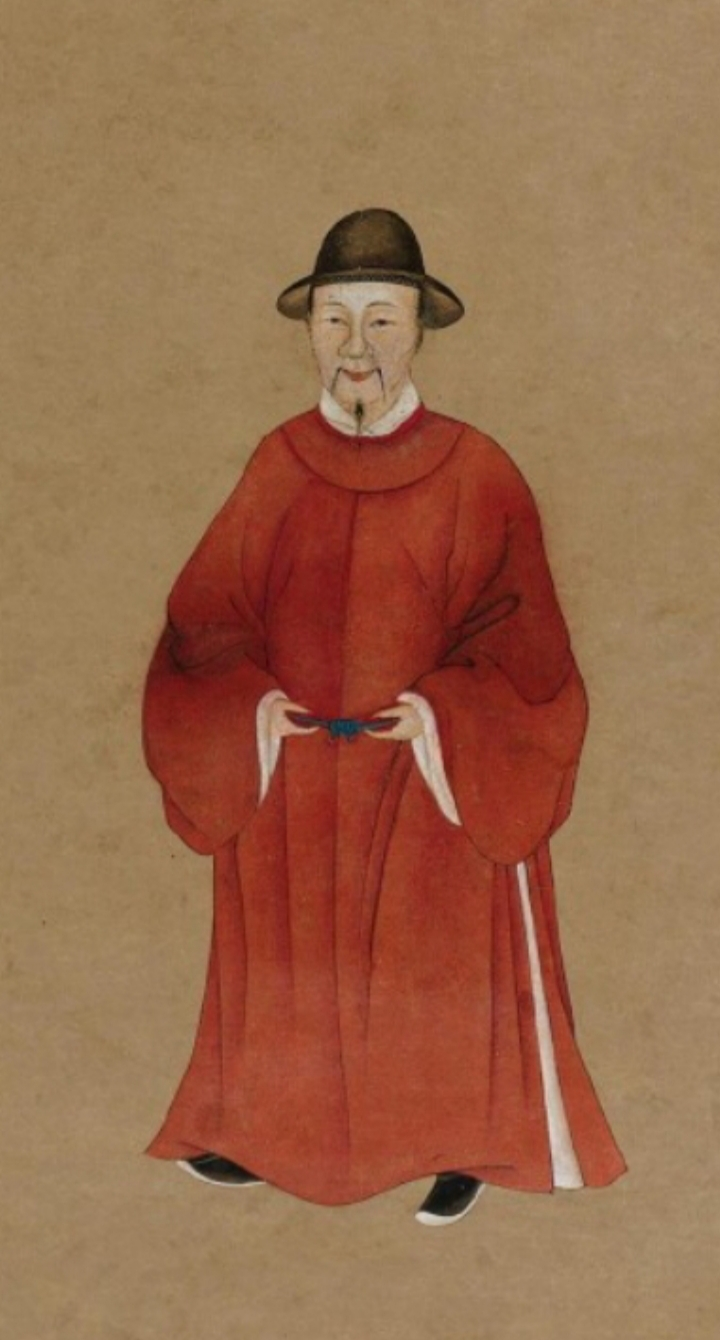
- Born: 6 March 1470
- Died: 7 January 1524 (aged 53)
- Education: Protégé of Wen Lin
- Known for: Poetry, Painting

Tang Yin (Chinese: 唐寅; pinyin: Táng Yín; Cantonese Yale: Tong Yan; 6 March 1470 – 7 January 1524), courtesy name Bohu (伯虎) and Ziwei (子畏), was a Chinese painter, calligrapher, and poet of the Ming dynasty period.

Even though he was born during the Ming dynasty, many of his paintings, especially those of people, were illustrated with elements from Pre-Tang to Song dynasty art.

Tang Yin is one of the most notable painters in the history of Chinese art. He is one of the "Four Masters of Ming dynasty” (Ming Si Jia), which also includes Shen Zhou (1427–1509), Wen Zhengming (1470–1559) and Qiu Ying (c. 1495–1552). His influence on the art of later artists, like Cai Han, is notable. Tang was also a talented poet, and together with his contemporaries Wen Zhengming, Zhu Yunming (1460–1526), and Xu Zhenqing, he was one of the "Four Literary Masters of the Wuzhong Region".

== Life ==
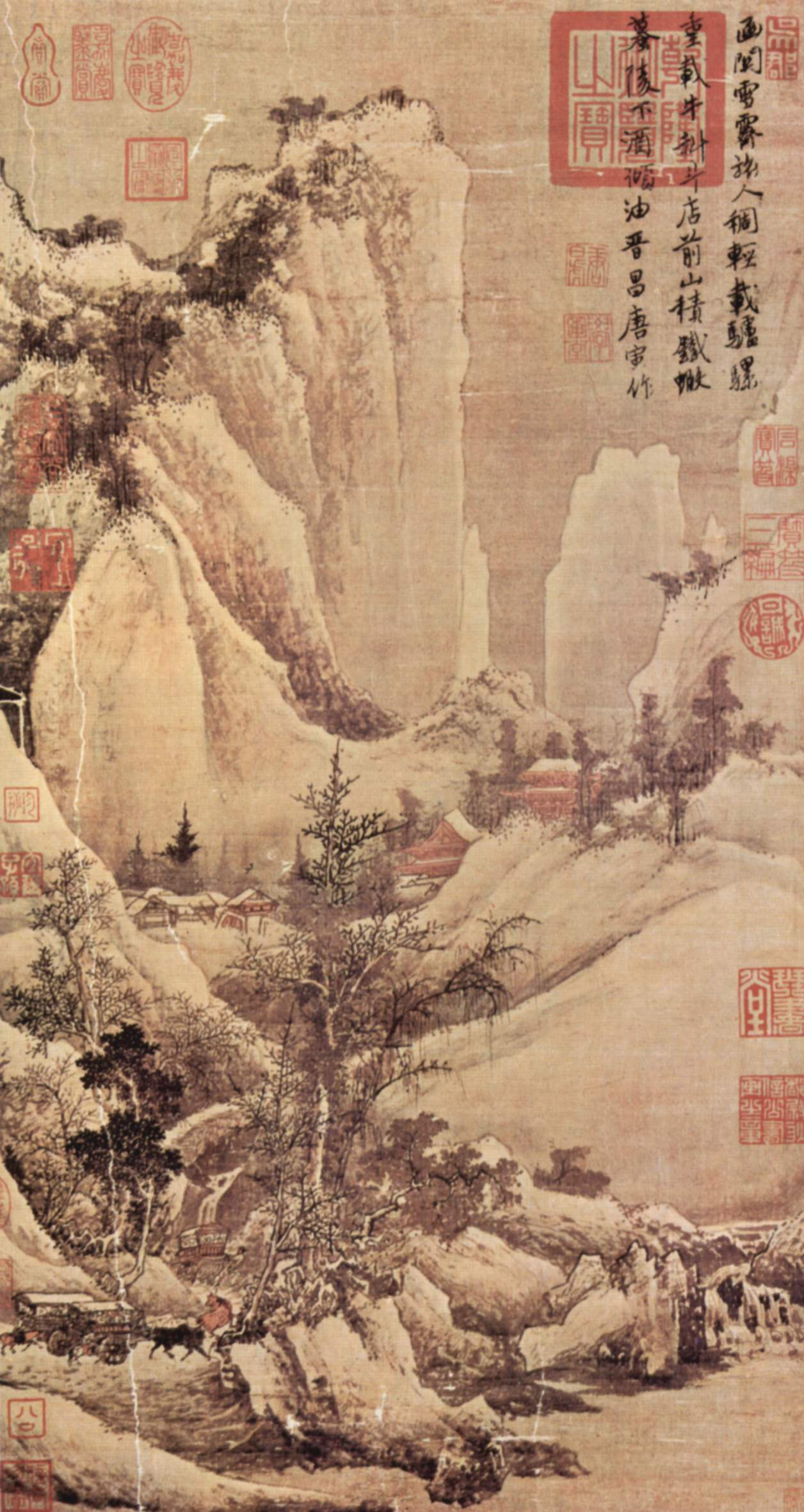
Clearing after Snow on a Mountain Pass by Tang Yin (函關雪霽)

Tang emerged from the vital merchant class of Suzhou, at a very low economic level of the son of a restaurant operator. Contrary to some accounts, he seems to have studied assiduously during his youth, paying little attention to material gains. His genius, which would later gain him renown as the supreme talent of the Jiangnan area (Southern China), soon drew him into the wealthy, powerful, and talented social circles of Suzhou. Wen Zhengming became his friend; Wen's father, Wen Lin (1445–99), acted as something of a patron, making the right connections for him.

He was a brilliant student and later became the protégé of Wen Lin. His friends in the Suzhou scholarly circles included Shen Zhou, Wu Kuan (1436–1504) and Zhu Yunming. In 1498 Tang Yin came first in the provincial examinations in Nanjing, the second stage in the Imperial examination ladder. The following year he went to the capital to sit in the national examinations, but he and his friend Xu Jing (?–1507) were accused of bribing the servant of one of the chief examiners to give them the examination questions in advance. All parties were jailed, and Tang Yin returned to Suzhou in disgrace, his high hopes for a distinguished civil service career dashed forever.

Denied further official progress, he pursued a life of pleasure and earned a living by selling his paintings. That mode of living brought him into disrepute with a later generation of artist-critics (for example, Dong Qichang) who felt that financial independence was vital to enable an artist to follow his own style and inspiration. While Tang is associated with paintings of feminine beauty, his paintings (especially landscapes) otherwise exhibit the same variety and expression of his peers and reveal a man of both artistic skill and profound insight.

== Works ==
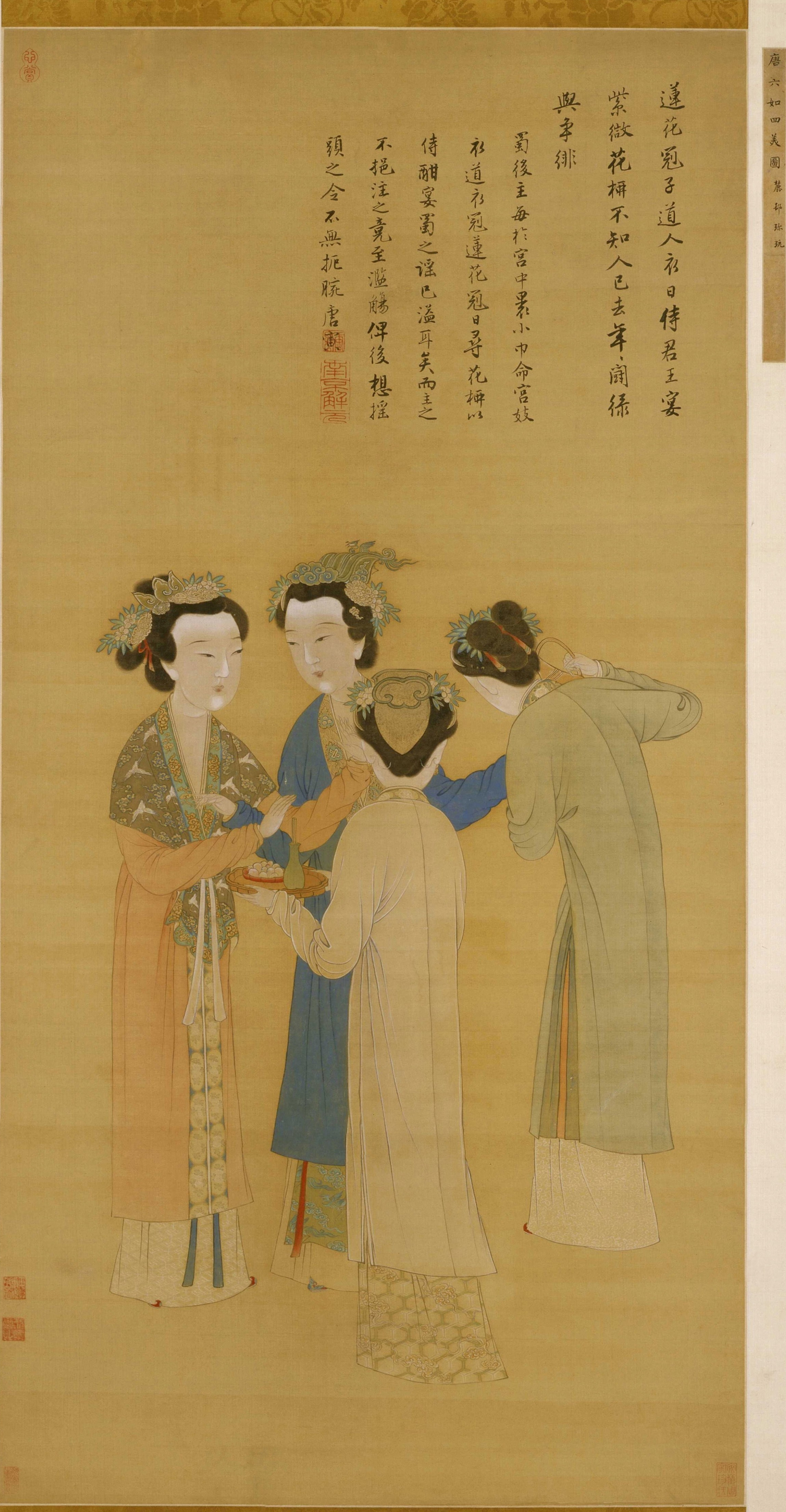
Court courtesans of the Former Shu by Tang Yin (1470-1524)

Tang Yin perfected an admirable hand in semi-cursive script (also known as running script). His poems touch on themes which people like Wen Zhengming or the older Shen Zhou would have never taken up. Tang seems compelled to deal with the base elements in man - envy, venality, and cupidity. Tragic unfulfillment, driven by belief in the relentlessness of fate and the bitterness of the ultimate truth imbues his more thoughtful poems. At times he is overcome by tragic sorrow for the loss of childlike innocence; at times even love is fraught with ruin and unhappiness. Those poems which do manage to begin on an optimistic note often end on a note of regret.

Tang Yin also wrote A Short Verse on Bamboo:

"The moon sinks in the fourth watch, Paper windows seem transparent; Stirring from wine, I prop my head and read awhile. High thoughts, I force myself, but can't help it; Ten stalks, still green in winter, cast profuse shadows."

The painting The Return Home of Tao Qian was acquired by Eve Myers in 1950, when she was an employee of General Chenault's 'Flying Tigers' in Taiwan, as thousands of refugees were fleeing Mao's regime with whatever they could carry.

== Myth ==
Tang's eccentric lifestyle has prompted storytellers to immortalize him as a trickster character in Chinese folklore. In one such story, he falls in love with a slave girl whom he glimpses on the boat of a high official passing through Suzhou. He has himself sold as a slave to the official's household so that he may approach her. With the help of his friends, he eventually succeeds in bringing her home. This story prompted the play Three Words by Feng Menglong and the opera The Three Smiles.

== Legacy and popular culture ==
Tang's life was the basis for a number of plays and films based on Feng Menglong's story.

- Xin Tang Bohu dian Qiuxiang (Hong Kong, 1953)
- How the Scholar Tang Bohu Won the Maid Qiuxiang (Hong Kong, 1957) In this film, Tang Bohu is played by Yam Kim-fai
- The Three Smiles (Hong Kong, 1969). In this film, Tang Bohu is played by Ivy Ling Po
- San Xiao Yin Yuan (Hong Kong, 1975). In this film, Tang Bohu is played by Loong Kim Sang
- Flirting Scholar (Hong Kong, 1993)
- Flirting Scholar 2 (Hong Kong, 2010)
- Jiang Nan Si Da Cai Zi (The Four Scholars of Jiangnan, 2014)
- Flirting Scholar from the Future (Hong Kong, 2019)

Tang was the subject of a major exhibition at the National Palace Museum, Taipei.

== Gallery ==
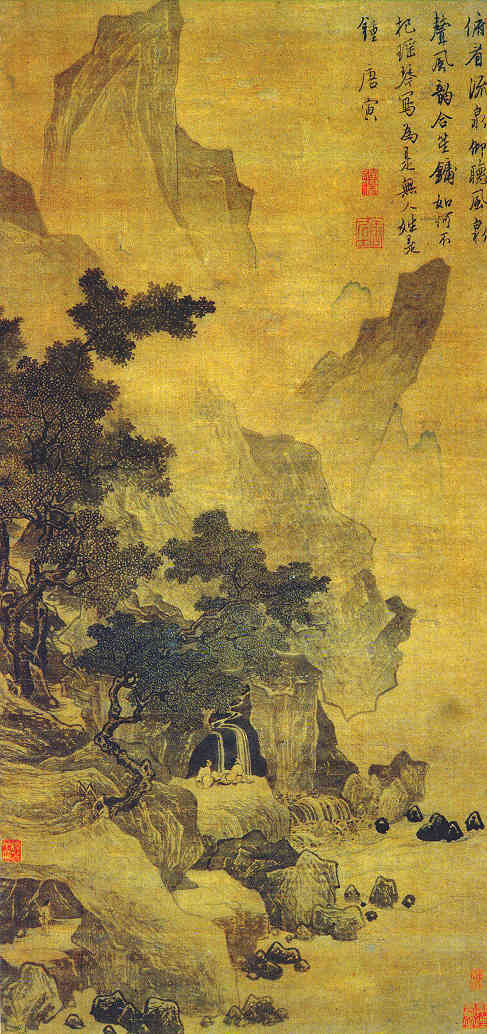
Watching the Spring and Listening to the Wind (看泉聽風圖), Nanjing Museum

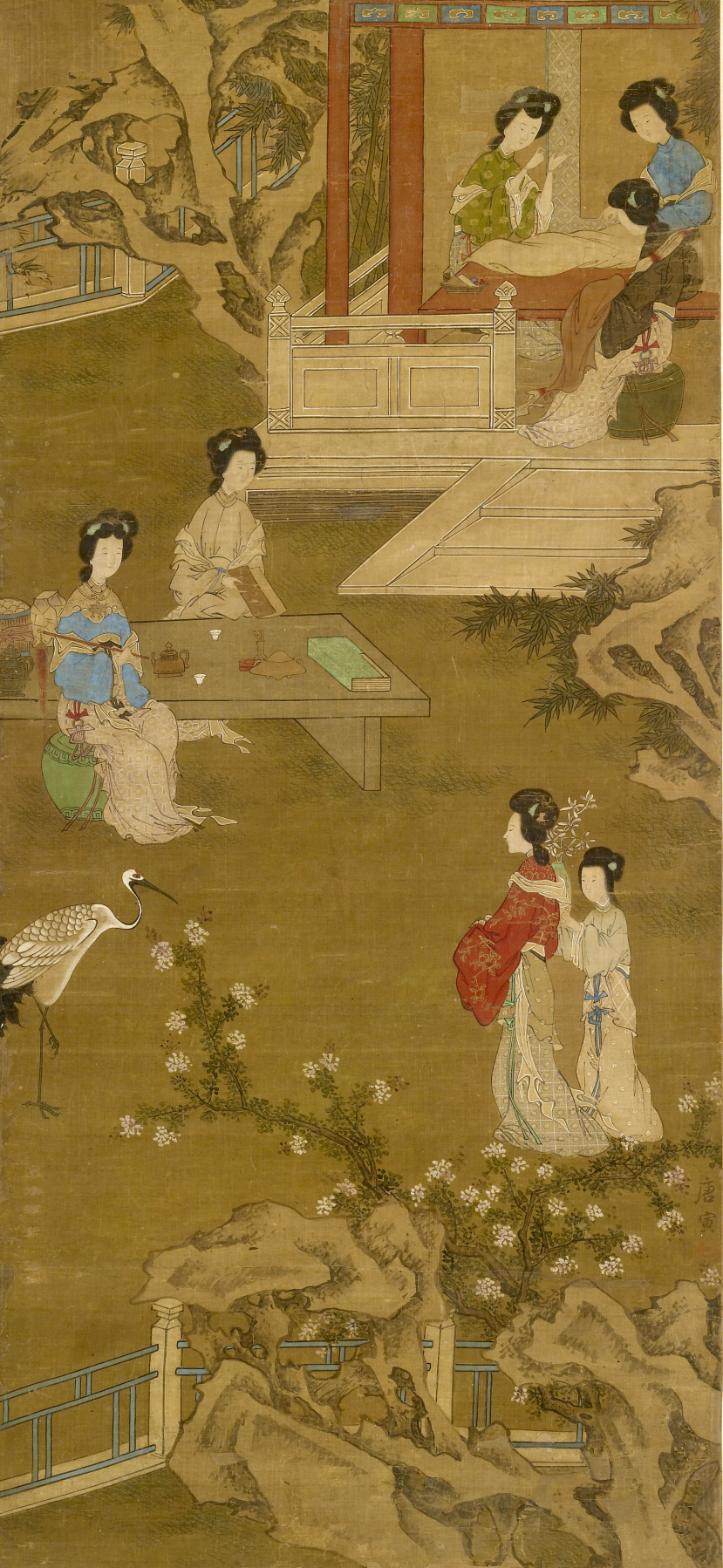
Making the Bride's Gown

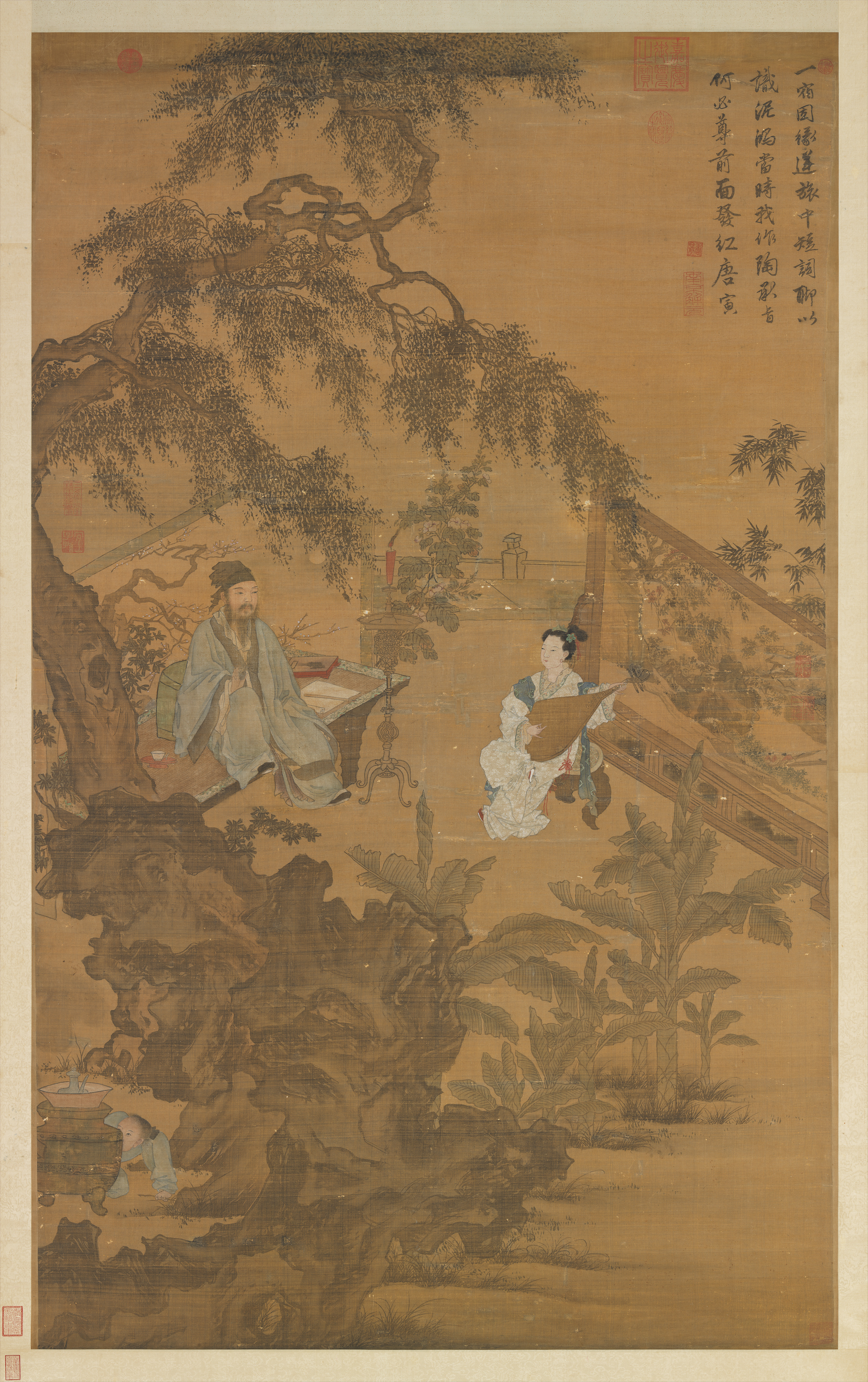
Tao Gu Presents a Poem (陶穀贈詞圖)

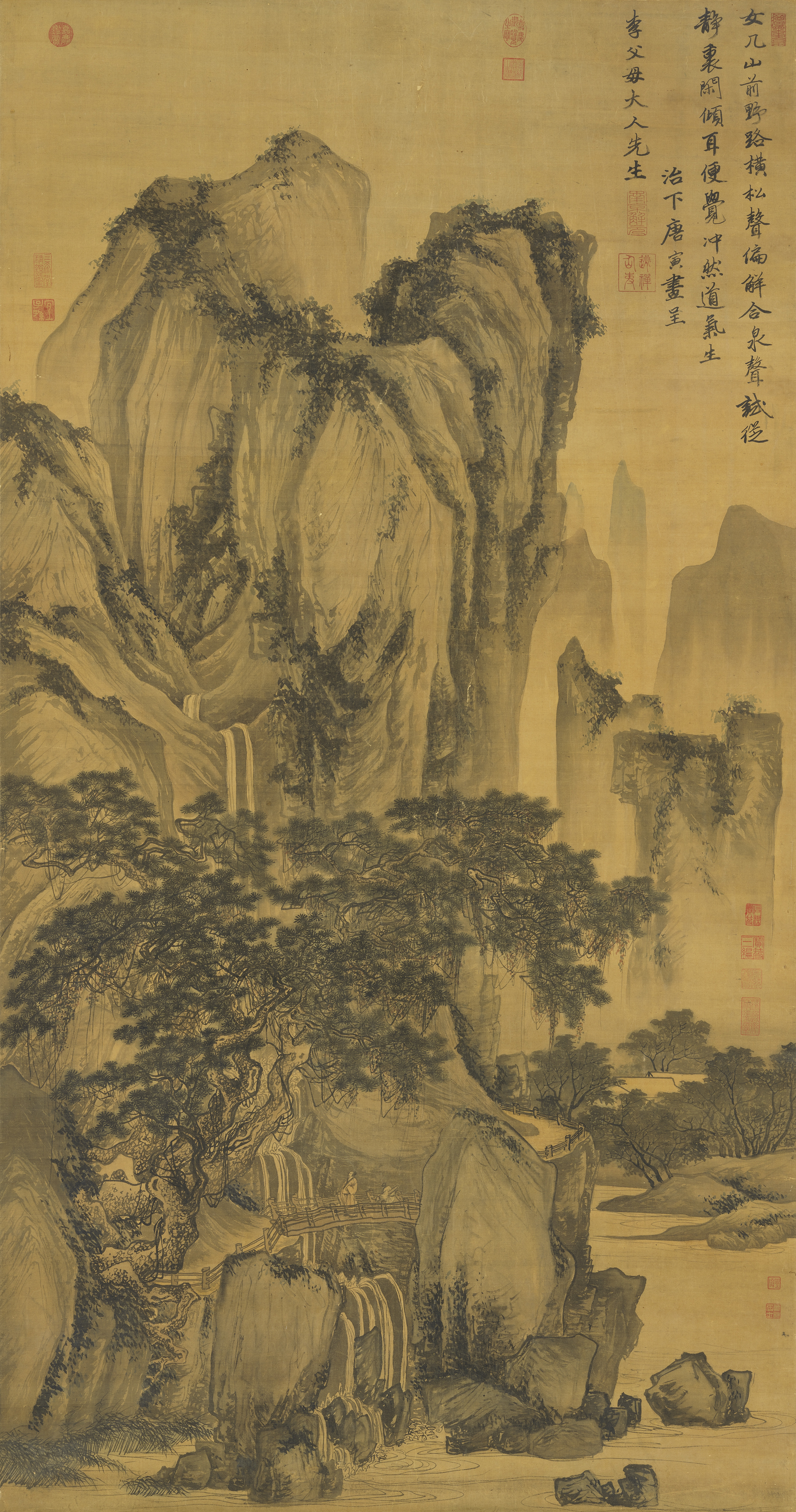
Mountain Road and Whispering Pines (山路松聲)

== See also ==
- Ming dynasty painting
- Youxia
