= Cai Han =

Chinese artist (1647–1686)

Cai Han 蔡含
- Born: 1647; Wu County, Jiangsu, Qing China
- Died: 1686 (aged 38–39); Qing China
- Notable work: Auspicious noon (午瑞图)
- Style: Chinese landscape paintings
- Spouse: Mao Bijiang

Cai Han (Chinese: 蔡含; 1647–1686), was a Chinese landscape painter. She was the concubine of the painter Mao Xiang and, with his other concubine Jin Yue, she was commissioned by him with the task of producing paintings as gifts to his guests; they became known as "The Two Painters of the Mao Family".

== Names ==
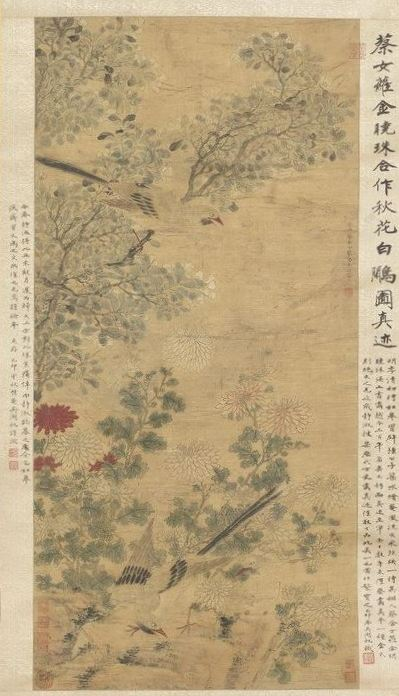
White pheasants and flowers painted by Cai Han and Jin Xiaozhu and inscription by Mao Xiang.

Cai Han's courtesy name on attaining adulthood was Nüluo (Chinese: 女蘿). She also went by her art name of Yuanyu (Chinese: 園玉).

== Life ==
Cai was the daughter of a member of staff in the house of Mao Xiang in Rugao. Sometime during the reign of the Shunzhi Emperor, an artist from Suzhou called Wu Ruixian (Chinese: 吳蕊仙) sought refuge with Mao. Wu taught Cai to paint and write poetry. Around 1661, Cai became one of Mao's concubines, along with Jin Yue (Chinese: 金鈅). The two women collaborated on many compositions, earning renown as 'the two artists of the Mao family' (Chinese: 冒氏兩畫史).

== Art ==
Cai Han was particularly well-known for her landscape paintings. The Guochao Hua Zheng Xulü (Chinese: 国朝画徵续录) described Cai as, 'particularly good at painting landscapes, flowers, animals, and birds,' and, 'adept at imitations.' She painted many pieces together with her fellow concubine Jin Yue 金鈅, including Auspicious noon, now held in the Nanjing Museum. In her depictions of people, Xie Li identifies the influence of Tang Yin on Cai's technique. In 2001, one of Cai's works painted in 1680, titled Shuihui yuan tu (Chinese: 水繪園圖), appeared at an auction house in Shanghai, where it was sold for 40,000 RMB to an unknown buyer.
