= Ru Long =

Chinese translator and professor

- 汝龙
- Born: 1916; Suzhou, Jiangsu, China
- Died: 1991 (aged 74–75); Beijing, China
- Education: Beijing North China High School
- Occupations: Translator, professor
- Spouse: Wen Ying
- Children: 2
- Writing career
- Language: Chinese, English, Russian
- Period: 1946–1991
- Notable work: Collected Works of Anton Chekhov

Ru Long (simplified Chinese: 汝龙; traditional Chinese: 汝龍; pinyin: Rǔ Lóng; 1916 – July 1991) was a Chinese translator and professor.

He was one of the main translators into Chinese of the works of the Russian novelist Anton Chekhov.

== Biography ==
Ru was born in Suzhou, Jiangsu in 1916. His father was an officer in Pingsui Railway Bureau.

At the age of 6 Ru settled in Beijing with his family. He graduated from Beijing North China High School (北京华北中学).

From 1938 to 1945, Ru taught at Jiangbei County School (江北县立中学), Chongqing Fuxing School (重庆复兴中学), Sichuan Bashu School (四川巴蜀中学), Chongqing Fudan School (重庆复旦中学), and Sichuan Peiling School (四川涪陵中学).

After the founding of the PRC, Ru became an associate professor at Jiangsu Culture and Education College (江苏文教学院), Dongwu University (东吴大学), China Literature College (中国文学院), and Sunan Literature and Education College (苏南文化教育学院).

Ru worked as the chief editor in Shanghai Pingming Publishing Company (上海平明出版社) in 1952 and he joined the China Writers Association in 1955.

In 1985, Ru was appointed a director of China Writers Association and Chinese Translation Association.

== Works ==
- Collected Works of Anton Chekhov (Anton Chekhov) (契诃夫文集)
- Short Stories of Anton Chekhov (Anton Chekhov) (契诃夫短篇小说选)
- The Biography of Maxim Gorky (Rushin) (高尔基传)
- The Resurrection (Leo Tolstoy) (复活)

== Personal life ==
Ru married English literature translator Wen Ying (文颖), the couple had a son and a daughter, Ru Qihe (汝企和) and Ru Yiling (汝宜陵), both are English literature translators.
