= Yellow Registers =

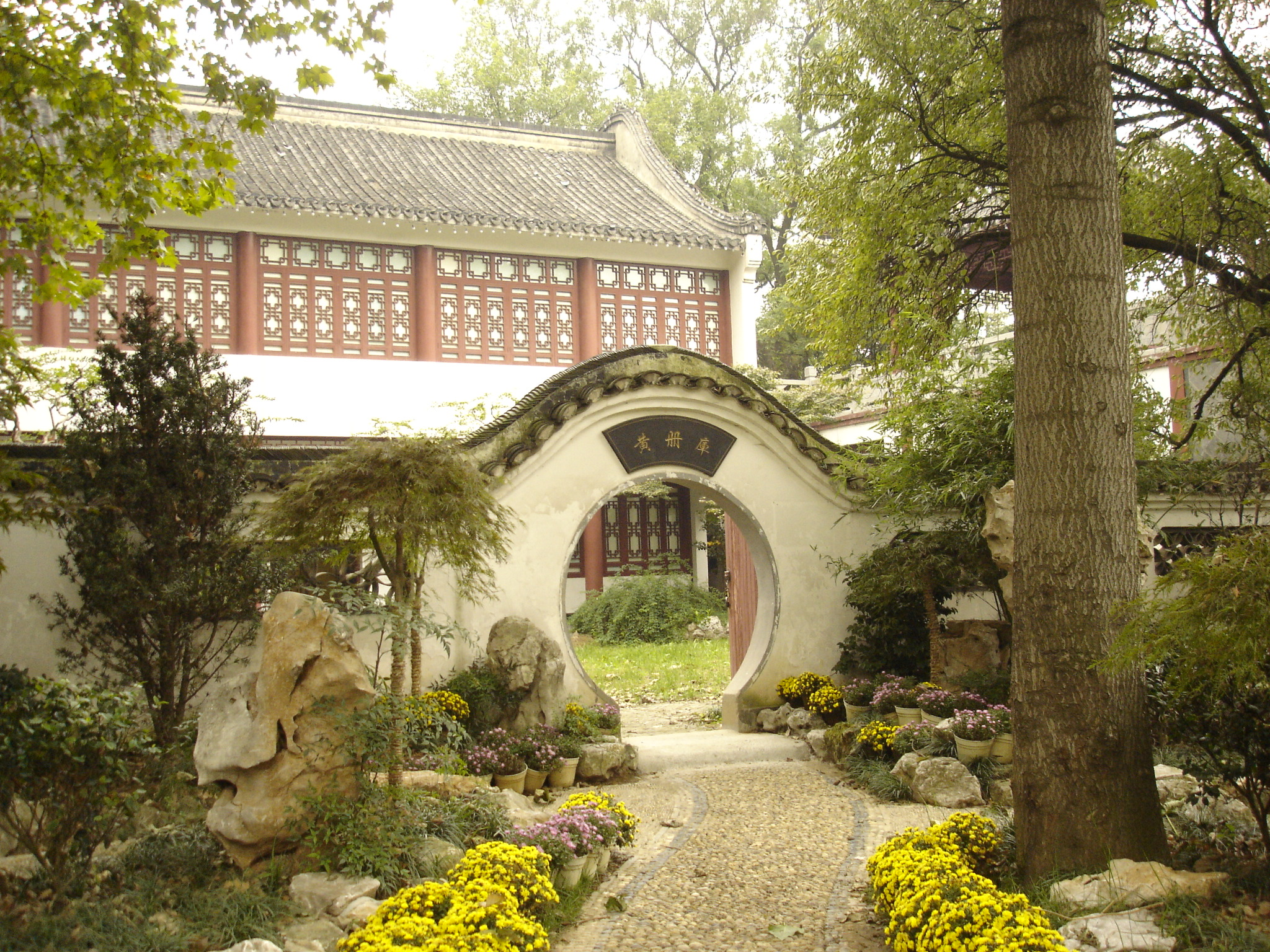
The Yellow Registers archive on an island in Xuanwu Lake, Nanjing

The Yellow Registers, (Note: simplified Chinese: 黃册; traditional Chinese: 黃冊; pinyin: Huángcè) also known as the yellow registers for taxation and labour recruitment, (Note: simplified Chinese: 赋役黄册; traditional Chinese: 賦役黃冊; pinyin: Fùyì Huángcè) were, from the 14th to the 17th century in the Ming dynasty, lists of taxpayers that recorded the members of each household and their land holdings.

== History ==
The Yellow Registers were based on household registration (戶, hu). They recorded both the members of each household (able-bodied men, women, and children) and its property, particularly land. The records also noted any changes compared to the previous period. These household lists served as the basis for assigning households into groups of 110 families under the lijia system and for determining their tax obligations.

Every ten years, the Ming government printed and distributed registration forms throughout the empire. Village elders, or the heads of the ten- and hundred-ten-household groups within the lijia system, were responsible for investigating the circumstances of the families under their authority and correctly completing the forms. The forms were then collected by the county office, where they were checked and compared with earlier censuses before being forwarded to higher authorities. The completed registration forms were kept in the county offices, while copies were stored in the offices of the prefectures, provinces, and the Ministry of Revenue in Nanjing.

A nationwide census and the compilation of registers were first carried out in 1381, followed by another in 1391. Due to the civil war, the next census was not conducted until 1402, and from then on it was regularly conducted every ten years throughout the entire Ming dynasty. The final census, the twenty-seventh, was conducted in 1642.

The registers were distinguished by their yellow covers, which were used for the copies intended for the central archive and from which the registers took their name. The copies stored in the regions had blue covers. The Ministry of Revenue established an archive in 1381 on the islands of Xuanwu Lake (known as Houhu during the Ming) near Nanjing to house the Yellow Registers. Over time, the archive grew to an enormous size, with 60,000 fascicles of documents added after each ten-year update of the registers. This required the construction of 30 new halls. By the beginning of the 17th century, the archive contained 667 buildings, and shortly before the end of the dynasty, it held 1.7 million documents in 700 buildings. The archive was almost completely destroyed in 1645 during the fighting that accompanied the fall of the Ming dynasty.
