= Ming dynasty painting =

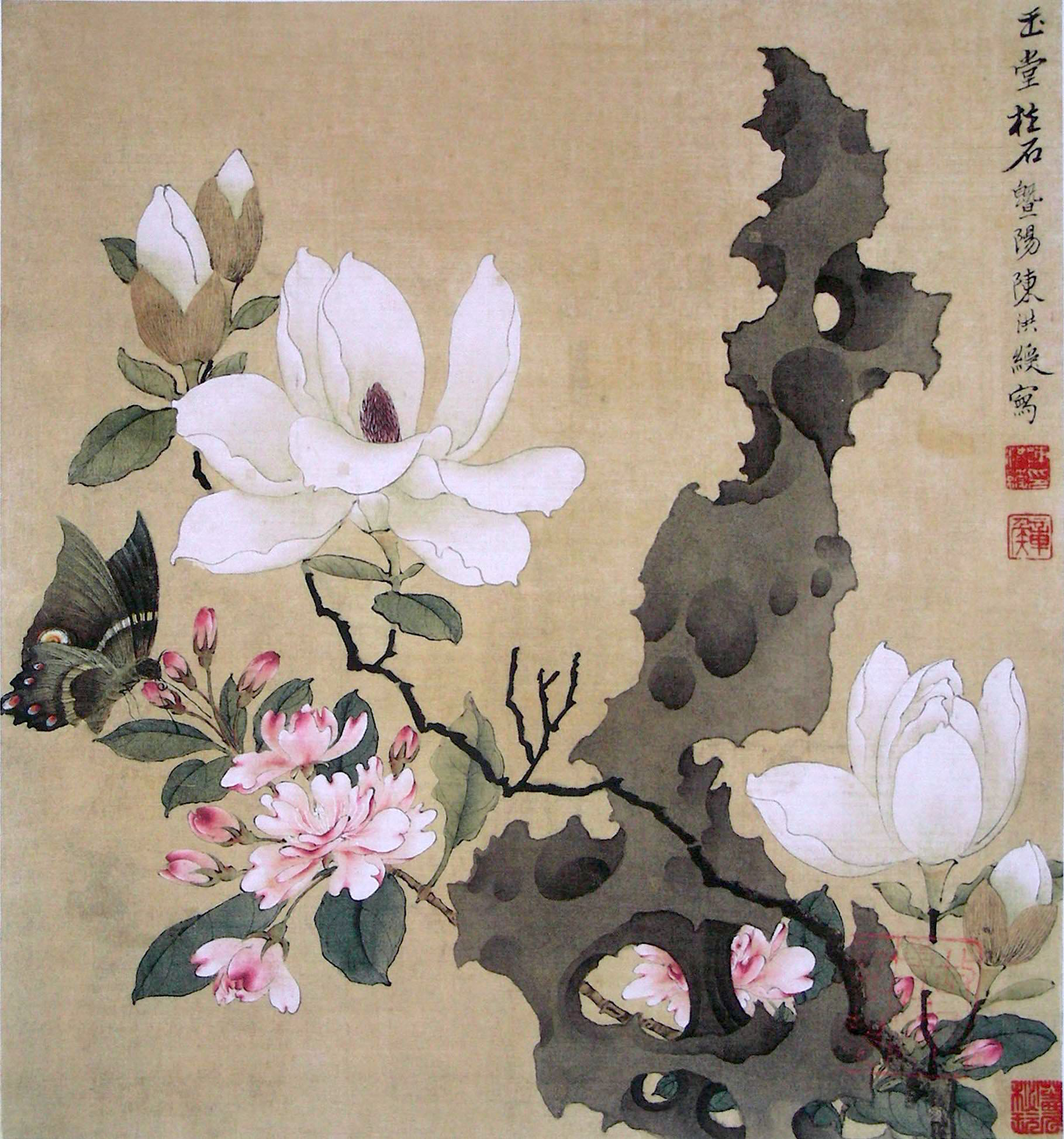
Leaf album painting of flowers, a butterfly, and a twisted rock sculpture, by Chen Hongshou (1598–1652).

During the Ming dynasty (1368–1644), Chinese painting progressed further basing on the achievements in painted art during the earlier Song dynasty and Yuan dynasty. The painting techniques which were invented and developed before the Ming period became classical during this period. More colours were used in painting during the Ming dynasty. Seal brown became much more widely used, and even over-used during this period.

Many new painting skills or techniques were innovated and developed, and calligraphy was much more closely and perfectly combined with the art of painting. Chinese painting reached another climax in the mid and late Ming. The painting was derived in a broad scale, many new schools were born, and many outstanding masters emerged.

== Development ==
An anchorite, by Dai Jin, founder of the Zhe School of painting

=== Early Ming period ===
About 1368–1505, from the Hongwu era (洪武) to the Hongzhi era (弘治).

The painting schools of the Yuan dynasty still remained in the early Ming period but quickly declined or changed their styles. The painting styles which were developed and matured during the Yuan period still heavily influenced the early Ming painting, but new schools of painting were born and grew.

Zhe School and the school which was supported by the royal court (Yuanti School) were the dominant schools during the early Ming period. The scholar-artist style of painting (Renwen Painting, in Chinese: 人文畫) became more popular. Both these two new schools were heavily influenced by the traditions of both the Southern Song painting academy and the Yuan scholar-artist.

=== Mid Ming period ===
About 1465–1566, from the Chenghua era (成化) to the Jiajing era (嘉靖).

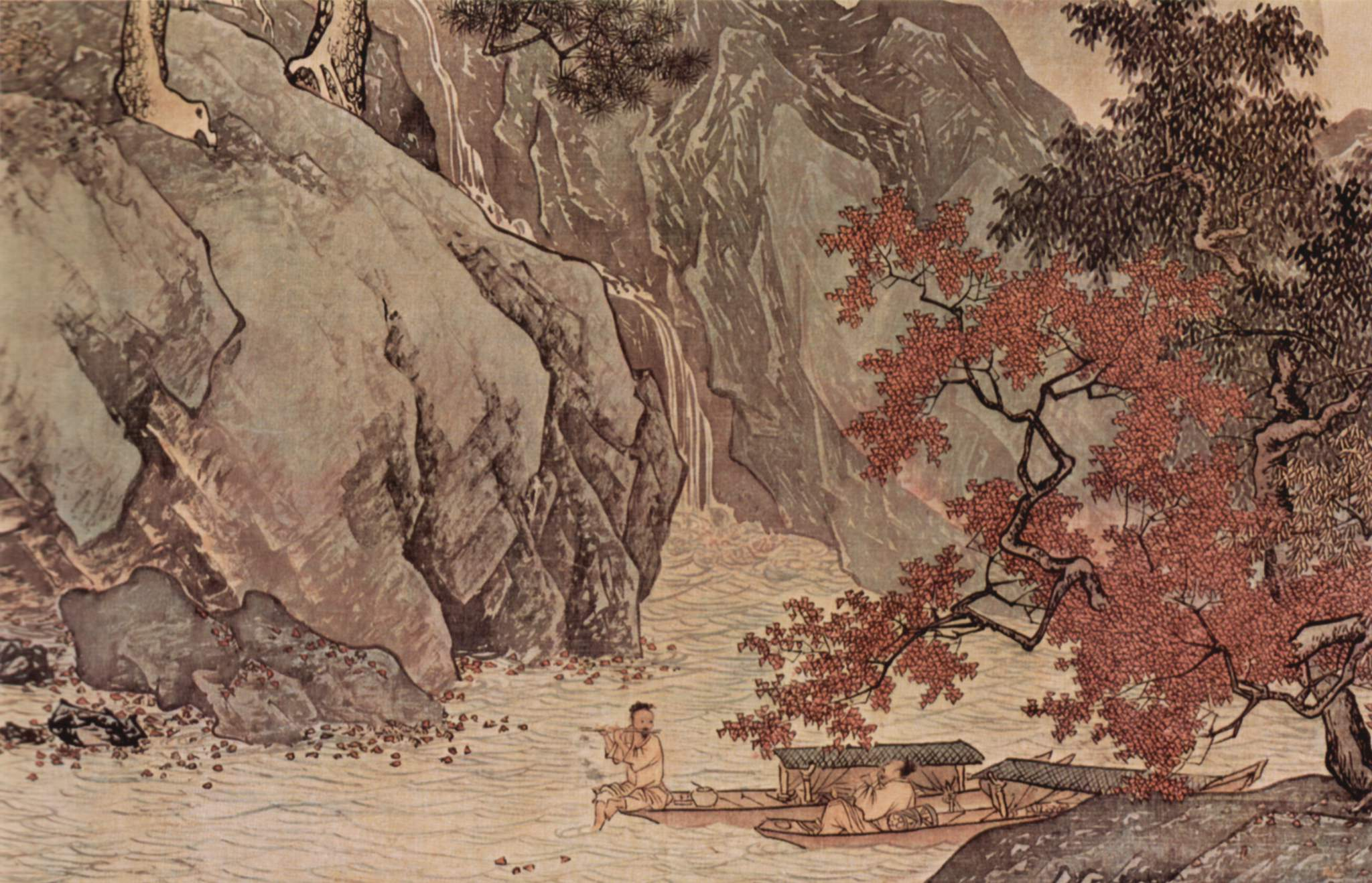
A Fisher in Autumn, by Tang Yin, 1523

Classical Zhe School and Yuanti School declined. Wu School became the most dominant school nationwide. Suzhou, the activity center for Wu School painters, became the biggest center for Chinese painting during this period.

The Wu painters mainly inherited the tradition of Yuan scholar-artist style of painting (Renwen painting, 人文畫) and further developed this style into a peak. Wu School was a large group of people, which included teacher-student relationships (e.g. Shen Zhou was the teacher of Tang Yin, Wen Zhengming, and so on) as well as family relationships (e.g. Wen family, including painters Wen Zhengming, Wen Jia (文嘉), Wen Boren (文伯仁), and so on).

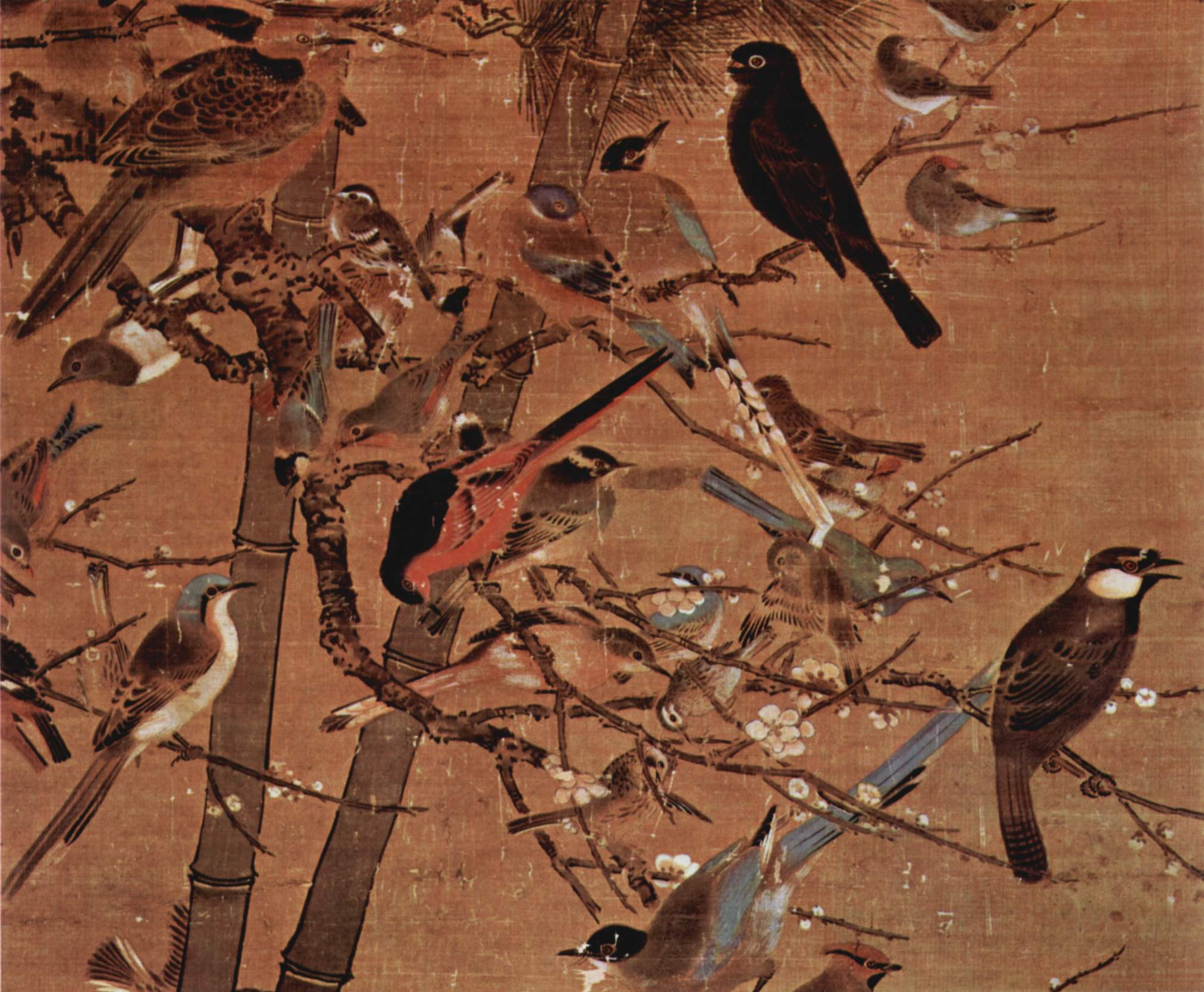
A painting of birds by Bian Wenjin, 1413

Xu Wei (徐渭) from Shaoxing, Zhejiang Province developed the "enjoyable style" of Chinese painting (Xieyi, 寫意畫) considerably, especially the "great enjoyable style" (Daxieyi, 大寫意). As an outstanding scholar, his accomplishments are mainly in the field of scholar-artist painting, especially in bird-and-flower painting.

Chen Chun (陳淳) followed the teaching from Wu School of painting during his early years and then developed his own "enjoyable" style in Shan shui painting (landscape painting, 山水畫).

=== Late Ming period ===
About 1567–1644, from the Jiajing era (嘉靖) to the Chongzhen era (崇禎).

Songjiang School and Huating School were born and developed, and they formed the rudiments of the later Shanghai School.

== Schools and painters ==
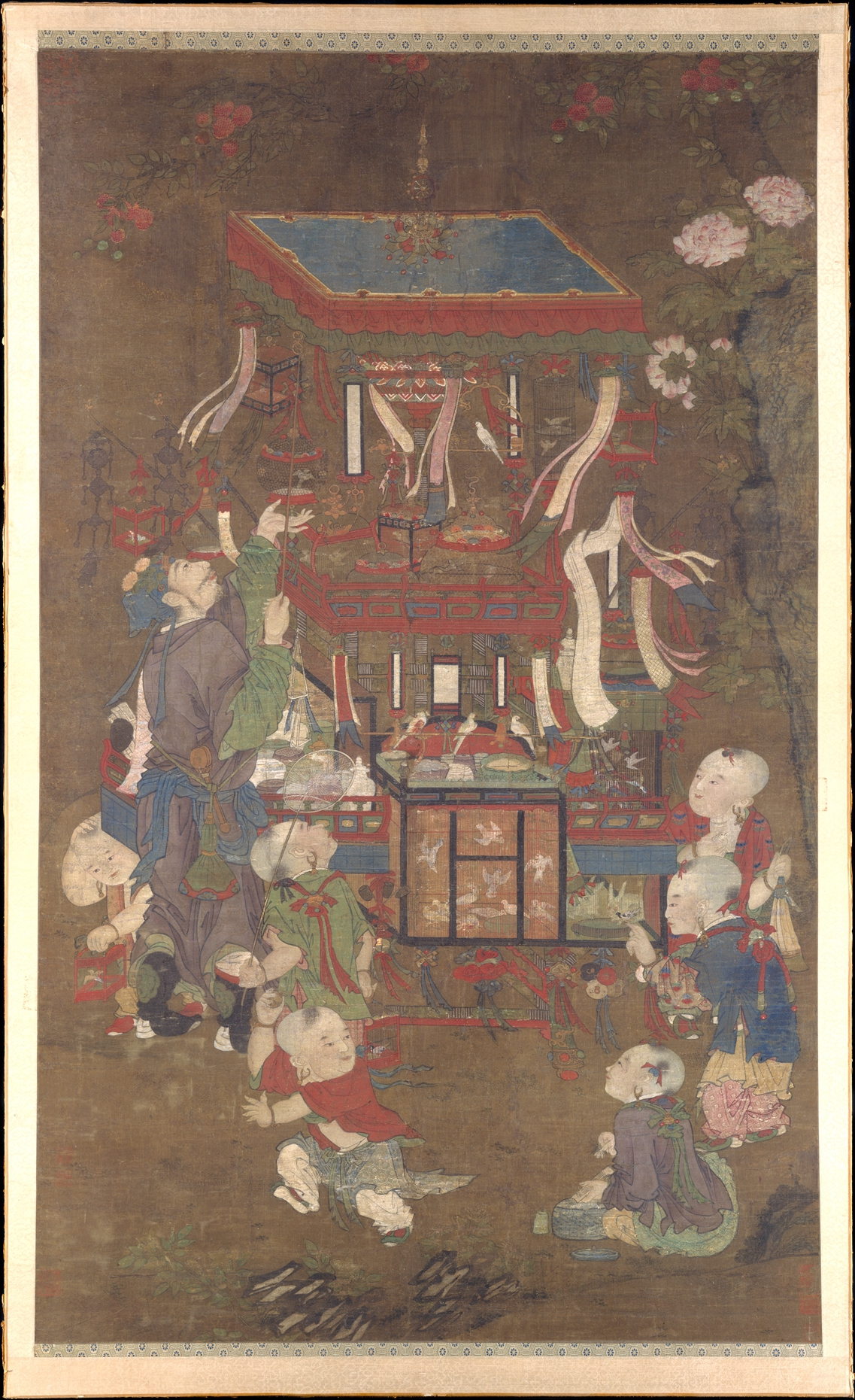
Bird Peddler, 15th-16th century

- Zhejiang School of Painting (浙派, full name in Chinese: 浙江畫派)
  - Jiangxia School (江夏畫派)
  - Wulin School or Post-Zhejiang School (武林畫派, or 後浙派)

Dai Jin (戴進), Wu Wei (吳偉), Lan Ying (藍瑛) (Lan family)

The core place for this school was Hangzhou in Zhejiang Province. Jiangxia School from Hubei Province was a branch of this school. Dai Jin was the founder of this school, and he also kept a very close relationship with the Yuanti School.

Peach Festival of the Queen Mother of the West, early 17th century, anonymous painter of the Ming dynasty

Lan Ying was the last master of this school, along with his family members, and they formed a branch of Zhejiang School—Wulin School, because their family was located in Wulin (武林), a place in Hangzhou near the West Lake.

Most of the painters from this school are Zhejiang natives.

=== Yuanti School (院體畫派) ===
Lin Liang (林良), Lv Ji (呂紀)

This school was organized and supported by the Ming central government, and it served the Ming royal court. The activity center for this school was first located in Nanjing, then went to Beijing because of the change of Ming's capital.

=== Wumen School (吳門畫派) ===
Tang Yin (唐寅), Wen Zhengming (文徵明), Shen Zhou (沈周), Qiu Ying (仇英), Zhou Chen (周臣), Wen Jia (文嘉)

The primary location for this school was Suzhou, whose literary name was Wumen (吳門). Tang Yin, Wen Zhengming, Shenzhou, and Qiu Ying were the four painters regarded as the "Big Four of the Ming Period" in Ming period painting.

=== Additional schools ===
- Xieyi Huaniao (寫意花鳥)
  - Xu Wei (徐渭)
- Xieyi Shangshui (寫意山水)
  - Chen chun (陳淳)
- Songjiang School (松江畫派)
  - Dong Qichang (董其昌)
  - The core place for this school was in the southern part of Jiangsu Province at that time, but now part of Shanghai. During the late Ming dynasty, the Songjiang School rivaled Wumen, particularly in generating new theories of painting.
- Huating School (華亭畫派)
  - Zhao Zuo (趙左)
  - This school is close to Songjiang School.
- Susong School (蘇松畫派)
  - This school is similar to Songjiang School.

== Influence ==
=== Japan ===
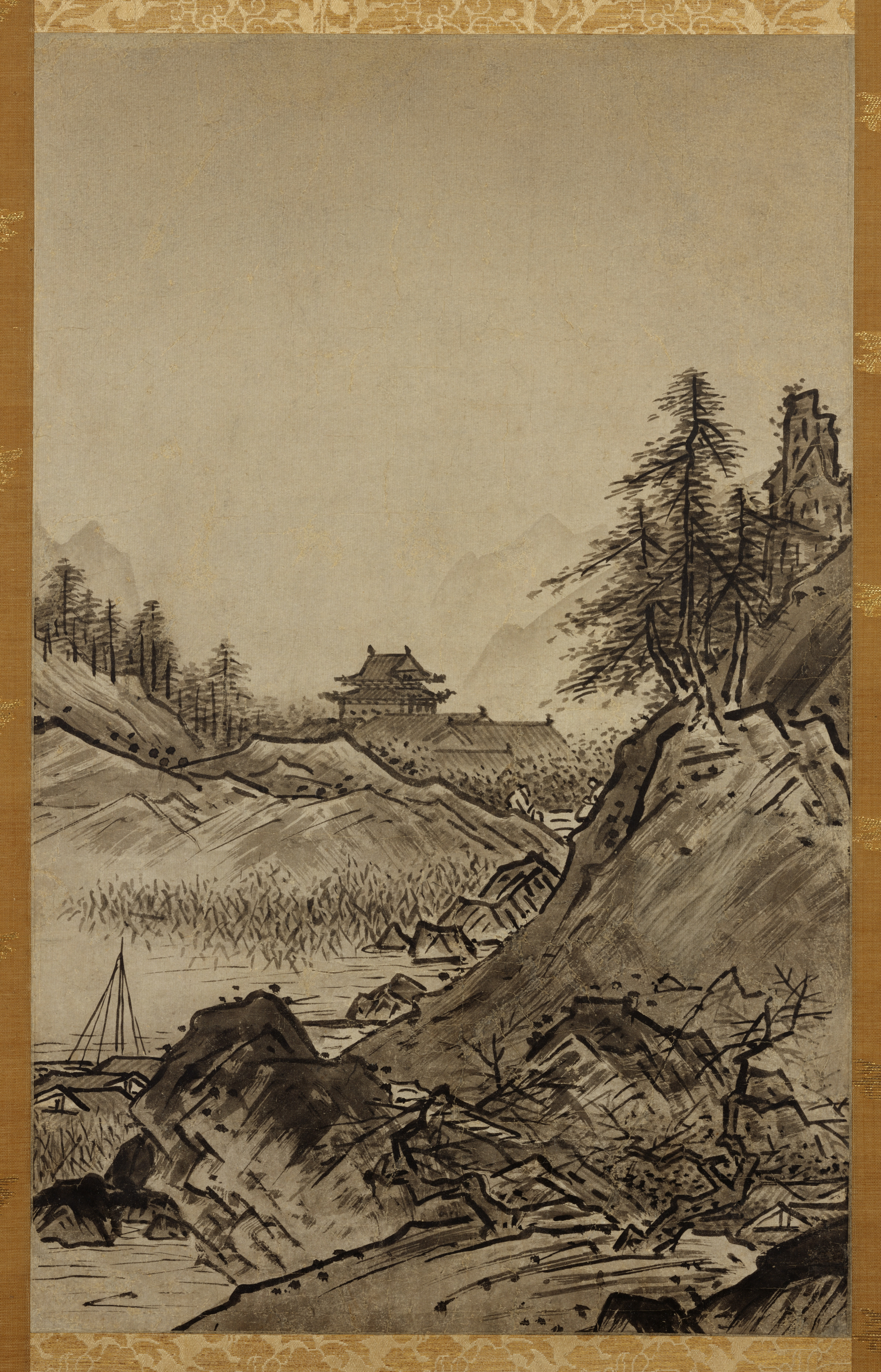
Autumn Landscape, by Sesshū Tōyō

The Japanese Zen monk painter Sesshū Tōyō (Japanese: 雪舟等楊) travelled to Ming China, and stayed for about 10 years learning painting. He was heavily influenced by the ink and wash painting, Zhejiang School of painting, and the Yuanti School of painting.

He resided in Tiantong Temple (Chinese: 天童寺) in Mingzhou (明州, now Ningbo), and also spent time in Beijing in the royal palace (Forbidden City). Before he went to Ming China, he studied Song and Yuan styles of painting (Chinese/Japanese: 宋元山水畫派) in Japan, and wanted to seek the origin of Chinese painting and the real spirit inside of Chinese art.

After returning to Japan, Sesshū Tōyō set up his school and further developed his own style of painting (漢畫派), a style mixed with the Japanese native traditional elements, and became the most celebrated master of painting in his era in Japan, continuing to heavily affect Japanese history to the present day.

=== Qing painting ===
Ming painting provided the basis for early Qing painting, from skills, style, subjects, and theoretical basis. The concept of Northern and Southern Schools, developed by Dong Qichang in the late Ming period, influenced the more academic formal painters, such as Wang Yuanqi, as well as providing an inspiration for daring originality for the "Individualist" painters, such as Kun Can and Shitao.

== See also ==
- Chinese art
- Chinese painting
- Ming dynasty
- Ming poetry
- Shuilu ritual paintings
