= Poet on a Mountaintop =

Ming dynasty painting by Shen Zhou

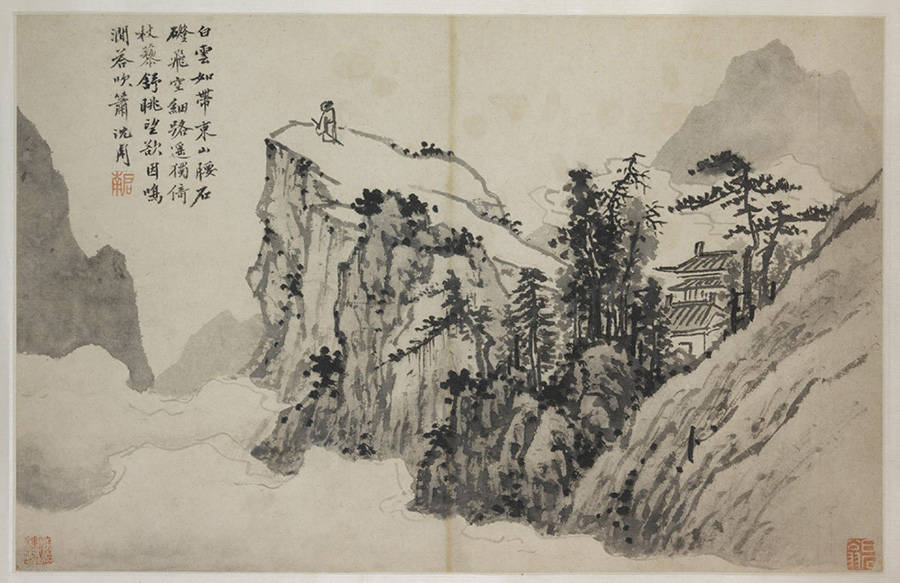
Poet on a Mountaintop

Poet on a Mountaintop (Chinese: 杖藜遠眺) is a painting by the Ming dynasty artist Shen Zhou (1427–1509), held by the American Nelson-Atkins Museum of Art in Kansas City, Missouri. Shen Zhou was a firm believer of Daoism as he mimicked the style of Yuan dynasty administrators through his paintings.

== Meaning behind the painting ==
During the Ming dynasty, the Chinese stressed their connection to nature. They viewed nature as a part of one's intellectual and spiritual growth. Man and nature worked together as a team. The views portrayed in this painting are meant to be anthropocentric, which sees humans as the most important piece of our universe. When an artist created a painting surrounding this concept, they were creating an escape from the city life of China. The landscape paired with a small visual of one human symbolizes man's insignificance in comparison to the powerful force of nature. Examining the words in the poem, it is clear that Shen Zhou is purposely shining a light on the magnificent views around the man in the painting.

The poem translates to:

White clouds sash-like
wrap mountain waists,
the rock terrace flies in space
distant, a narrow path.
Leaning on a bramble staff
far and free I gaze,
To the warble of valley brook
I will reply, whistling.

Shen Zhou has projected himself onto the painting and can be viewed as an extension of the viewer. Poet on a Mountaintop is one of the earliest examples of an artist using inscription as part of the work.

=== Posthumanism ===
Poet on a Mountaintop is a strong example of concepts of posthumanism being exemplified in art before the term was ever established. The poetry found in the painting makes observations that undermine concepts of Anthropocentrism, which views humans as the primary and/or only dictators of morality. Posthumanism in modern and contemporary art today focuses on the impact of technological advances in modern society and how it is changing philosophical and scientific perspectives of humans and their relationship with the world. During a time period before such technological advances, Poet on a Mountain Top expresses a separation between meaning distilled in established society and the wisdom found in nature, which pushes a posthumanist ideology in its spirit.

== History ==
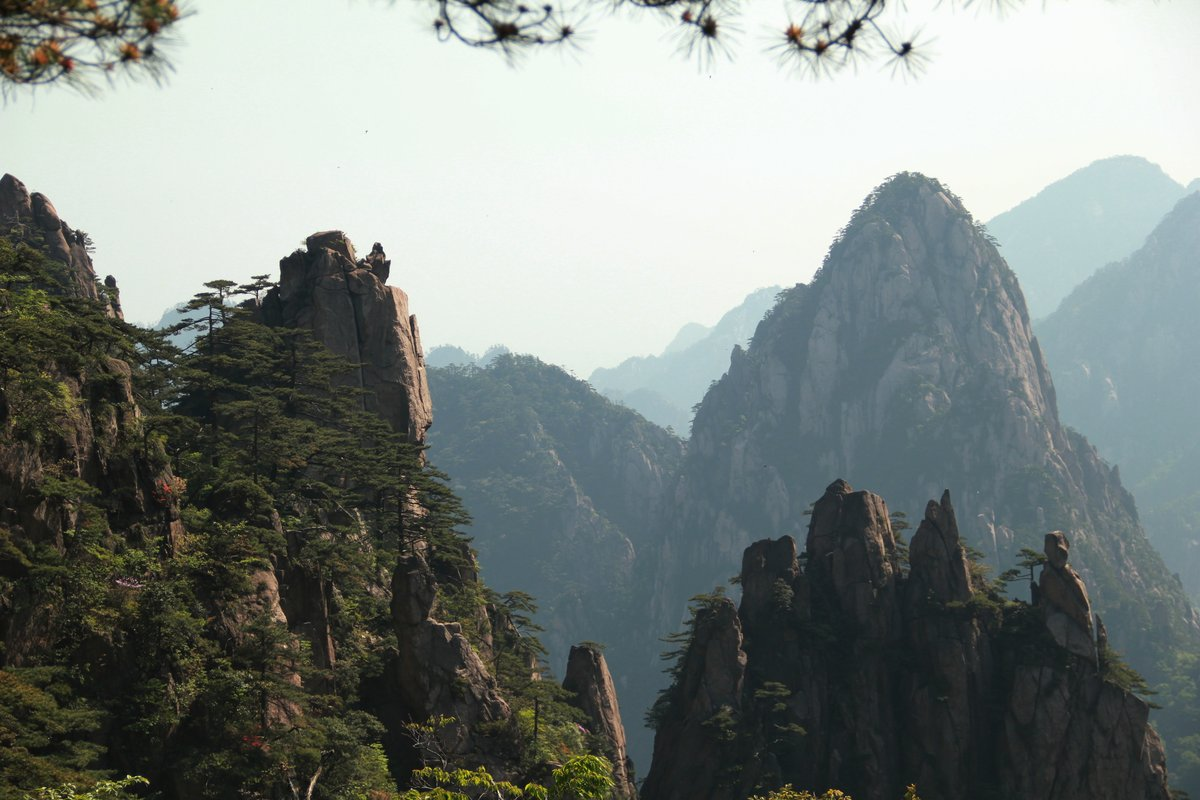
This is an example of the topography Shen Zhou experienced during his travels locally around Suzhou. It's likely Shen Zhou was depicting mountains very similar to these in Poet on a Mountaintop.

Shen Zhou's ancestors experienced the end of the Yuan dynasty otherwise known as the period of Mongol rule over China. His great-grandfather, Shen Liangchen (1340–1409) acquired property for the family estate at Xiangcheng, a decision that would transition Shen Liangchen's family into economic prosperity. This translated directly into the life of Shen Zhou who lived a life wealthy with money, knowledge, and culture. Shen Zhou's grandfather, Shen Cheng, was a famous art collector who hosted famous Chinese artists at the estate for most of his life. Shen Zhou's father, Shen Hengji (1409–77), along with his uncle, Shen Zhenji (1400 – c. 1482), also spent their entire lives creating works of art. Although the work of Shen Hengji and Shen Zhenji has not been maintained through history, their lives clearly had a direct effect on the ambitions of Shen Zhou. Due to the level of wealth this family experienced, Shen Zhou had a significant length of time to practice his craft. It was in young adulthood when Shen Zhou was introduced to the Wu School style of art. Shen Zhou's father and uncle had been taught by Chen Kuan (1398 – c. 1467), a teacher who was principal in demonstrating the style of the Wu School. Du Qiong (1397–1474) who had been a student to Chen Ji, the father of Chen Kuan, taught Shen Zhou everything he knows. This deep intermingling of family and scholars is what eventually formed Shen Zhou into the model student, referenced throughout history as an exemplification of the Wu School style. It is projected that c. 1471 is when Shen Zhou began creating Poet on a Mountaintop because this is when Shen Zhou began experiencing true independence. He found much of his inspiration for his works traveling locally around Suzhou. It is believed that the scene portrayed in Poet on a Mountaintop is a similar representation of a view Shen Zhou experienced during these travels.

== Connections to the time period ==
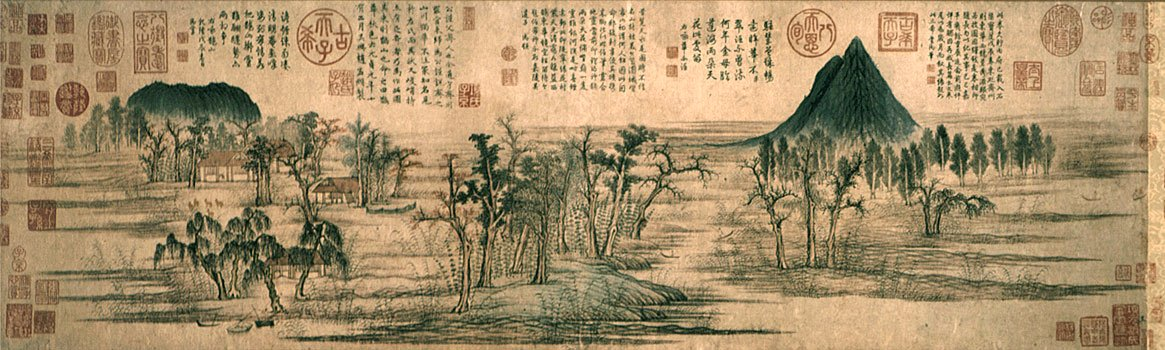
This is an example of the light brushstrokes used by many artists during the Yuan dynasty. Shen Zhou used a similar technique when creating his works.

Poet on a Mountaintop is in the style of the Wu School, which sought to emphasize a close relationship between poetry, calligraphy, and painting. In Poet on a Mountaintop, a poet stands at the top of a mountain, seemingly gazing at the poem written in calligraphy. All three forms of art are incorporated into this painting, each uniquely related to another, in the style of the Wu School. Shen Zhou drew on the work of artists from the Yuan dynasty and the Song dynasty, incorporating different aspects of each into his style. Much of his landscape art was based heavily on Yuan artists, borrowing their simplicity and intricate texture strokes to make a pure and refined style. Similarly, the influence of the Song dynasty on Shen Zhou's art can be seen in the de-emphasis of humans by drawing them as a small part of the painting instead of at the center. This is can be seen in Poet on a Mountaintop with its strong emphasis on landscape and lack of emphasis on the poet. The poet seems to be gazing off towards a poem that focuses on his surroundings, ensuring that nature is the focus of this painting.

== Influence ==
Poet on a Mountaintop is currently being held on display at the Nelson-Atkins Museum of Art in Kansas City, Missouri. The Daoist/Taoist ideologies that influenced Poet on a Mountaintop are still distilled in much of modern art. The emphasis of nature and smallness or insignificance of human-made structures can be seen in many modern artists. An example of this kind of art being practiced today can be found in the work of Xiao Ping, who uses similar traditional landscape and calligraphy techniques (below) that are found in Shen Zhou's paintings.

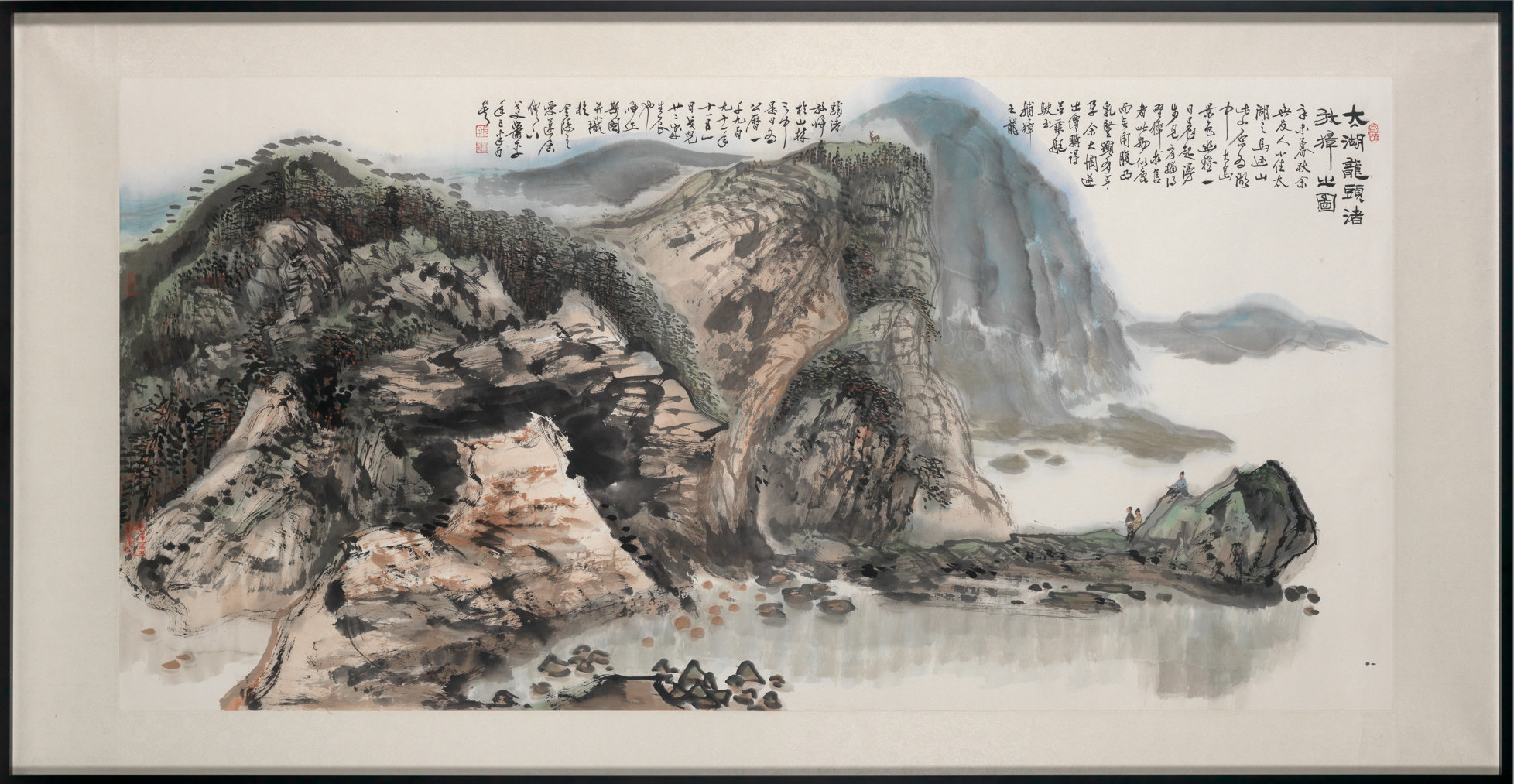
