= Chen Chun =

Chinese artist, calligrapher, and poet

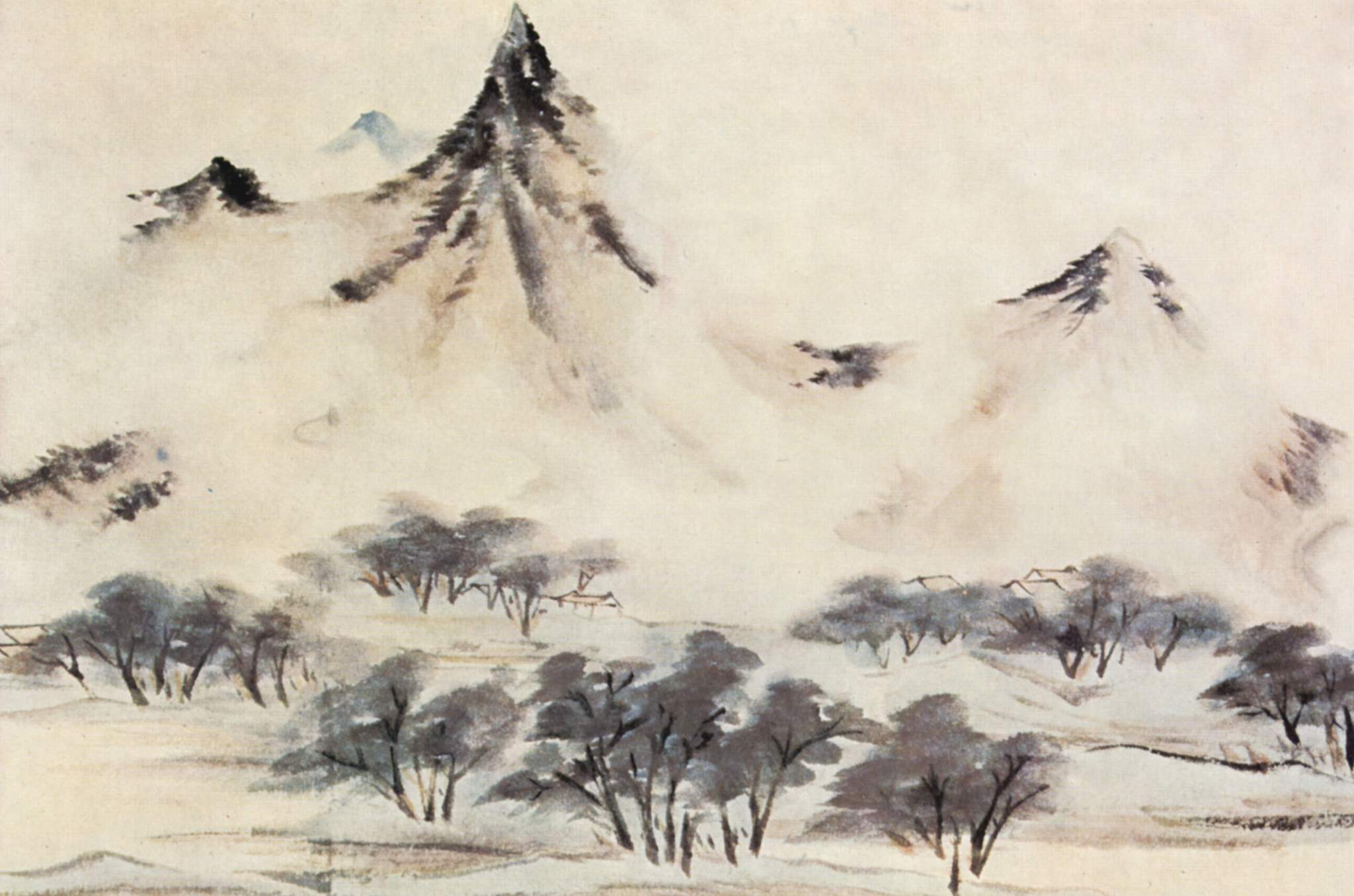
Chen Chun, Mountains in Clouds, 1535 Freer Gallery of Art

Chen Chun (Chinese: 陳淳; pinyin: Chén Chún; 1483–1544), courtesy name Daofu and art name Baiyang Shanren, was a Ming dynasty artist, calligrapher, and poet. Born into a wealthy family of scholar-officials in Suzhou, he learned calligraphy from Wen Zhengming, one of the Four Masters of the Ming dynasty. Chen Chun later broke with Wen to favor a more freestyle method of ink wash painting. He was associated with the Wu School of literary painting. Mi Fu of the Song dynasty had a strong influence on his work. Chen executed many landscapes, but to a degree is noted as a "Bird-and-flower" painter.
