= Li Yin =

17th-century Chinese female artist and poet

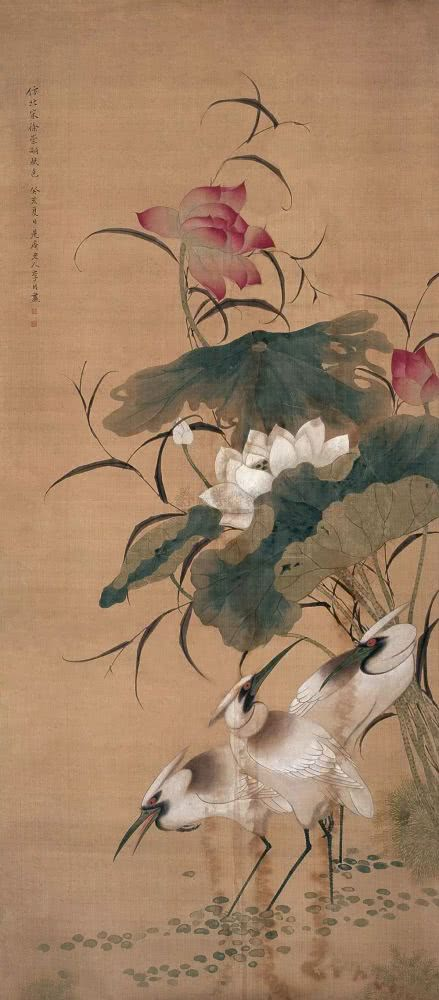
- Lotus flowers and birds, by Li Yin
- Born: C. 1610; Shaoxing, Zhejiang, Ming China
- Died: 1685; Haining, Zhejiang, Qing China
- Known for: Painting, calligraphy, poetry
- Spouse: Ge Zhengqi

Li Yin (Chinese: 李因; C. 1610 – 1685), also known by her courtesy name Jinsheng (今生) and her art names Shi'an (是庵) and Haichang Nüshi (海昌女史) or Kanshan Yishi (龛山逸史), was a Chinese calligrapher, courtesan, painter, and poet during the late Ming and early Qing dynasties. She was noted for her illustration of flowers and birds. Her artwork was highly sought after during her lifetime, resulting in fakes being produced by more than forty imitators.

== Early life ==
Li Yin was born in Kuaiji (Shaoxing), Zhejiang, during the late Ming dynasty. Various sources give her year of birth as 1610, 1611, or 1616. Her family background is not known, but according to the biography by Huang Zongxi, her parents made her study poetry and painting from an early age. Their financial circumstances were poor enough that she was said to have stored up liver mosses as paper and persimmon sticks to write with. Later, she became a Geji performer to make extra money, with Huang Zongxi comparing Li to her more famous contemporaries Wang Wei and Liu Rushi. She studied painting under an otherwise unknown master named Ye Danian (葉大年), who helped develop her style in the manner of Chen Chun and Xu Wei, two renowned painters of the previous century.

== Marriage with Ge Zhengqi ==
By the time she was in her teens, Li's talent in both art and poetry was already recognized. At 17, the scholar-official and artist Ge Zhengqi, moved by a poem of Li's, married her as a concubine. They had a close relationship and spent much time together painting and composing calligraphy.

During the reign of the Chongzhen Emperor, Ge served as an official in the imperial court in Beijing, where he and Li lived for more than ten years. He travelled extensively for official business, with Li accompanying him to numerous places along the Yellow River and the Yangtze in their 15 years of marriage. She often composed poems about what she saw in her travels.

Near the end of Chongzhen's reign, Ming China became increasingly unstable, leading Ge and Li to leave Beijing for Nanjing, the country's southern capital, in 1643. Upon reaching Suzhou in Anhui Province, they were attacked by members of a military rebellion. Li, wounded in the chaos, stayed to search for her husband instead of fleeing the danger, abandoning all her belongings except her poems. Ge was greatly moved by her loyalty and bravery, and his disciple, Lu Chuan, later wrote prefaces to Li's poetry collections, in which he praised her as a loyal "minister" to Ge and compares her to the ancient beauty Xi Shi.

== Later life ==
After the fall of the Ming dynasty in 1644, the Manchu Qing dynasty took control of Beijing, and set about conquering the rest of China. In 1645, Nanjing fell, with Ge committing suicide rather than submitting. For the next 40 years, Li Yin lived alone and in poverty at the Laughing Bamboo Studio in Haichang, Ge's hometown in the suburb of Haining. In honor of Ge, she called herself "Weiwang Yin" (未亡人), or The Widow. Li found it hard to make ends meet, earning money through spinning and weaving, as well as painting professionally. Despite this, she still maintained her ambitions and interests, often sitting alone under a lonely lamp and reciting poems, which, due to the changes in her life, had a more profound and melancholy style than he earlier work. The renowned scholar Huang Zongxi wrote her biography.

On her 70th birthday, Li composed a poem expressing her mixed feelings on not having children:

I have idled away seventy years of a floating life,
My true self has comprehended theravada.
Luckily I am spared from concerns for my children when I die.
Only cuckoos will cry on the ancient trees over my tomb.

— Li Yin

== Works ==
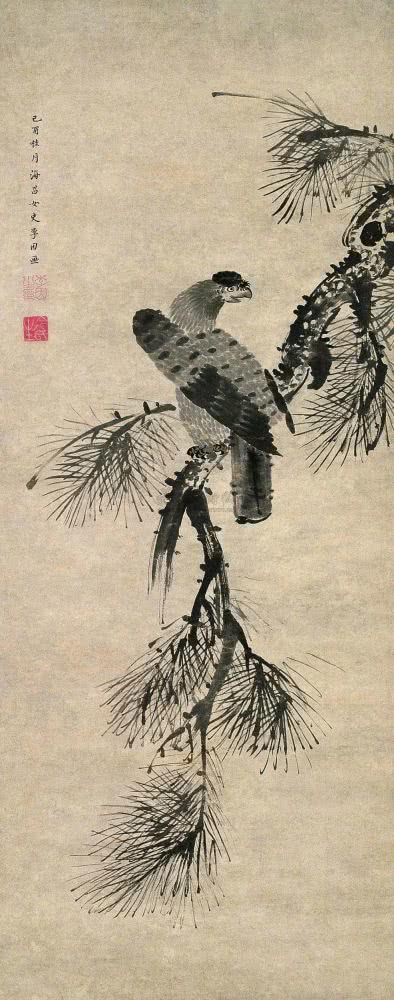
Pine and Eagle (1669)

Li Yin wrote 260 long and short poems, as well as the collections Zhuxiaoxuan Yincao (竹笑轩吟草) and Xu Zhuxiaoxuan Yincao (续竹笑轩吟草). Li Yin often compared herself to fellow poets Wang Wei of the Tang Dynasty, and Li Qingzhao of the Song Dynasty.

Li Yin was chiefly noted for her paintings of flowers and birds, typically in ink monochrome with fluid brushstrokes. Her reputation was such that her paintings were considered an essential souvenir from Haichang, and it is estimated there were over forty imitators in the area producing fakes for gullible tourists. She painted with a flowing ink style reminiscent of the Ming dynasty painter Chen Chun (1483–1544), and was considered to be the finest female painter by critic Qin Zuyong. Many of her paintings are in the collection of the Palace Museum, including:

- Flowers and Birds
- Pine and Eagle
- Willows and Magpies
- Mynas and Pomegranates
- Lotus and Mandarin Ducks
- Flowers and Plants

Her other paintings include:

- Flowers of the Four Seasons, 1649. Ink on satin.
- Yellow Hibiscus, date unknown, Ink on gold paper fan.
- Rock, Bird, and Pear Blossoms, 1654. Ink and colour on gold paper fan.
- Swallows and Peonies, 1673. Ink on satin hanging scroll.
