= He Zhen =

He Zhen is the name of:

- He Zhen (count) (1321–1388), Ming dynasty politician
- He Zhen (artist) (1541–1606), Ming dynasty seal artist
- He Zhen (anarchist) (1884–1920), Chinese feminist and anarchist
