= Four Masters of the Ming dynasty =

Grouping of major Chinese painters during the Ming dynasty period (1368–1644)

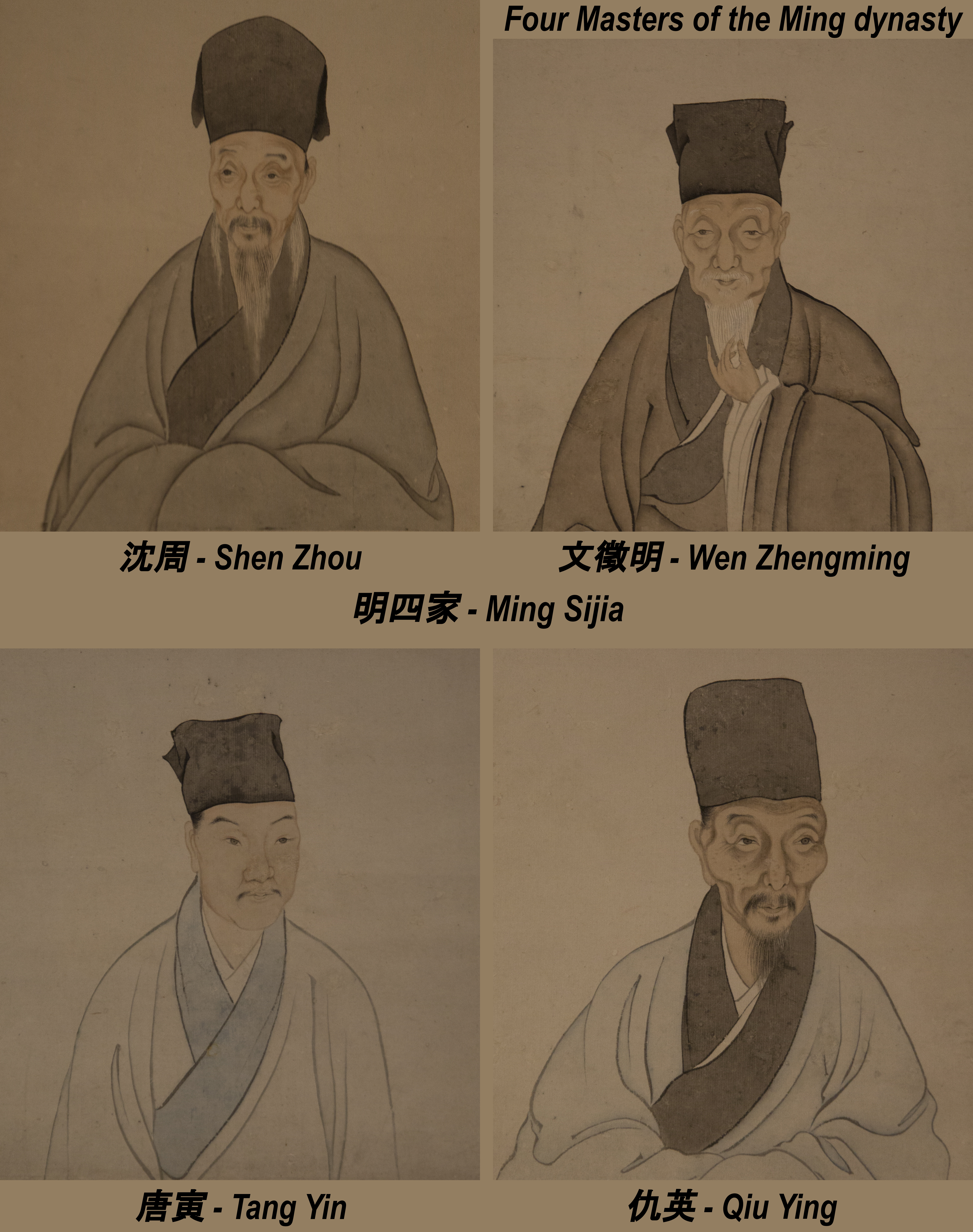
Four Masters of the Ming dynasty - 明四家 - Ming Sijia.

The Four Masters of the Ming dynasty (Chinese: 明四家; pinyin: Míng Sì Jiā) are a traditional grouping in Chinese art history of four famous Chinese painters that lived during the Ming dynasty. The group consists of Shen Zhou (1427–1509), Wen Zhengming (1470–1559), Tang Yin (1470–1523), and Qiu Ying (c.1494–c.1552). They were contemporaries, with Shen being the teacher of Wen, while Tang and Qiu was taught by Zhou Chen (1460–1535). All five of the aforementioned painters were part of the Wu School. Their styles and subject matter were varied. Qiu was solely a painter, while the other three developed distinct styles of Chinese painting, calligraphy, and poetry.

== Other names ==
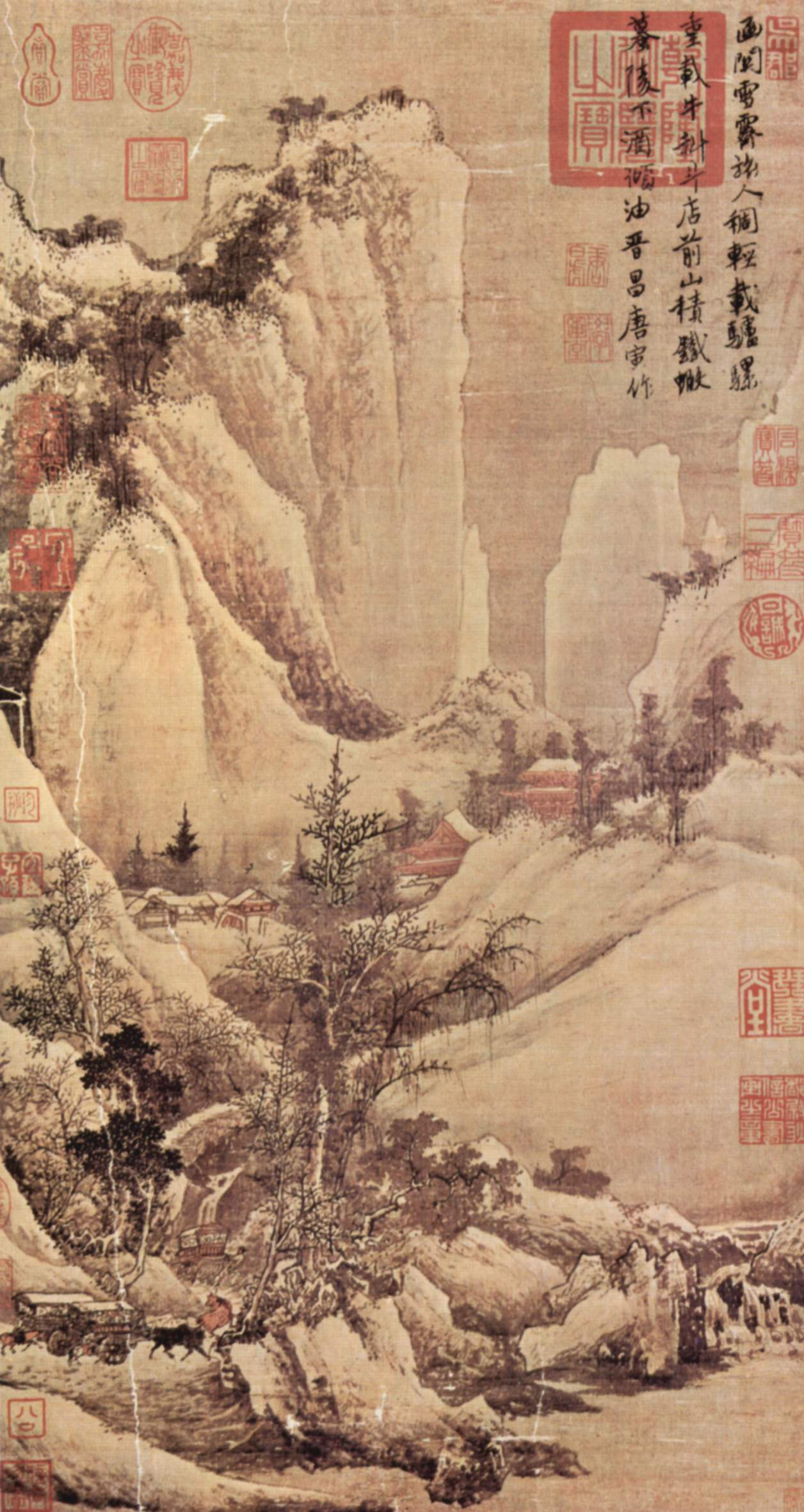
Clearing after Snow on a Mountain Pass by Tang Yin (1470-1524)

There are several alternative terms for these four leading painters:

- Four Great Masters of the Ming (Chinese: 明四大家; pinyin: Míng Sì Dàjiā)
- Four Masters of Suzhou: all four came from the vicinity of Suzhou
- Four Masters of Wu (simplified Chinese: 吴门四家; traditional Chinese: 吴門四傢; pinyin: Wúmén Sìjiā): all four came from the region of Wu, which surrounds the city of Suzhou

The "Four Masters" designation was first used in the mid-Ming dynasty, probably during the Jiajing era, and has continued to be applied since then.

== The painters ==
Some of the painters were friends when they were living, and were familiar with each other's works. Their family backgrounds varied, Tang Yin was born into a poor merchant background, while Wen Zhengming's father had strong connections and became a patron to Tang, suggesting a relatively prosperous family status. Both Tang and Wen were also skilled in poetry and calligraphy.

Shen Zhou was born in a respected and wealthy family. He was one of the main founders of the Wu School of painting and was also a poet, essayist and calligrapher. Wen studied painting with Shen while Tang and Qiu studied with Zhou Chen, all of whom from the Wu School and made major painting revival techniques from their predecessors.

Shen was most accomplished in shan shui painting and painted in a firm well-structured painting technique, probably following the techniques of Wang Ming. While Tang was accomplished in painting landscapes and semi-cursive script. Wen studied under the tutelage of Shen and would have borrowed painting techniques from him.

Except for Qiu, the other three painters were accomplished calligraphers and poets.

== See also ==
- Four Masters of the Yuan dynasty
- Six Masters of the early Qing period (Four Wangs)
- Ming dynasty painting
- Ink and wash painting
- Bird-and-flower painting
- Four Arts of the Chinese Scholar
