= Wen Jia =

Chinese painter (1501–1583)

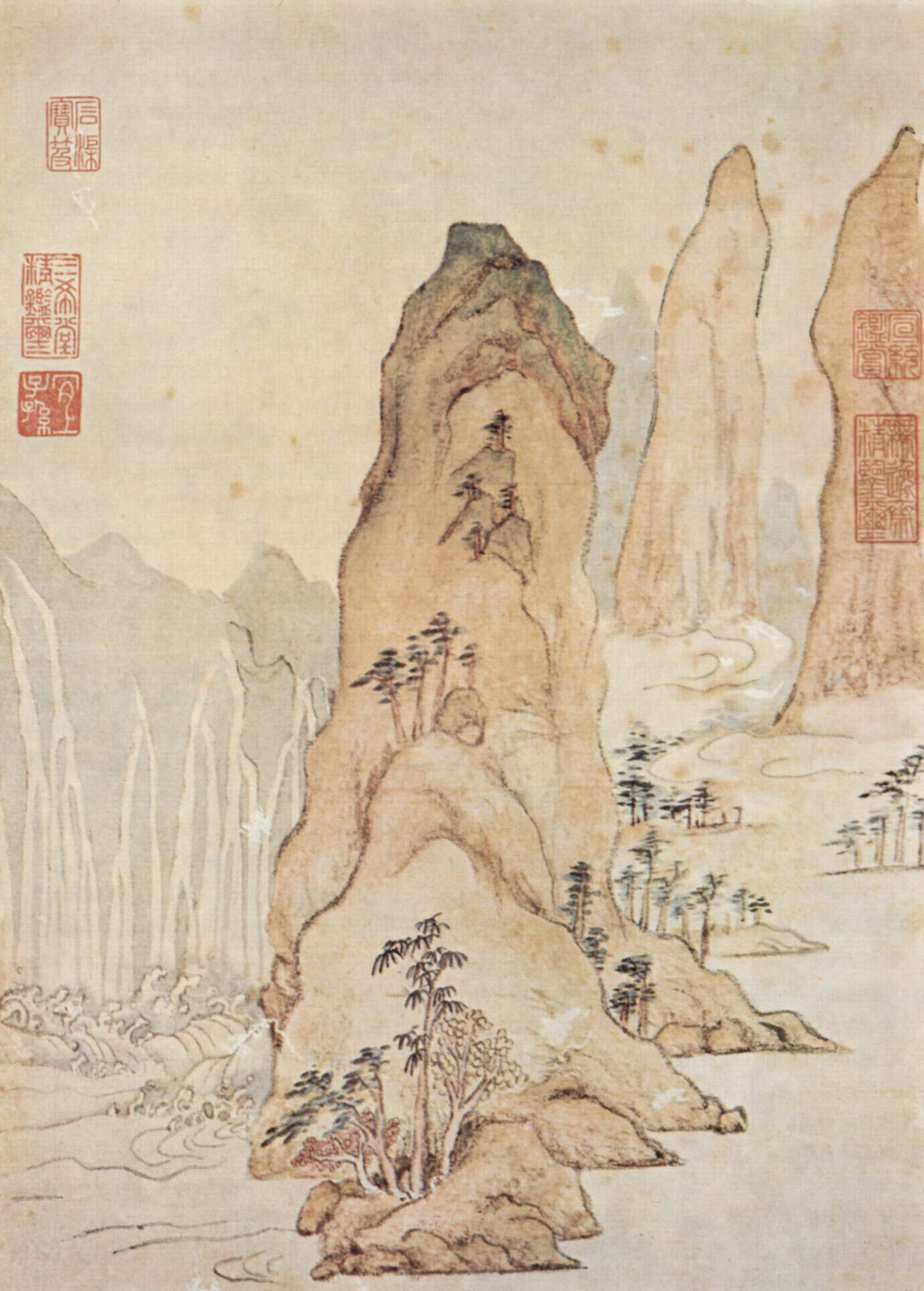
Wen Jia, Landscape in the Spirit of the Verses of Du Fu, National Palace Museum, 1576

Wen Jia (Wen Chia, Chinese: 文嘉; pinyin: Wénjiā); ca. 1501-1583 was a Chinese painter of landscapes and flowers during the Ming Dynasty (1368–1644).

Wen was born in the Jiangsu province. His style name was 'Xiu Cheng' and his sobriquet was 'Wen Shui'. Wen came from a family of painters. He was the second son of Wen Zhengming, and his brother Wen Peng became a painter as well.
