= Du Qiong =

Chinese landscape painter, calligrapher and poet

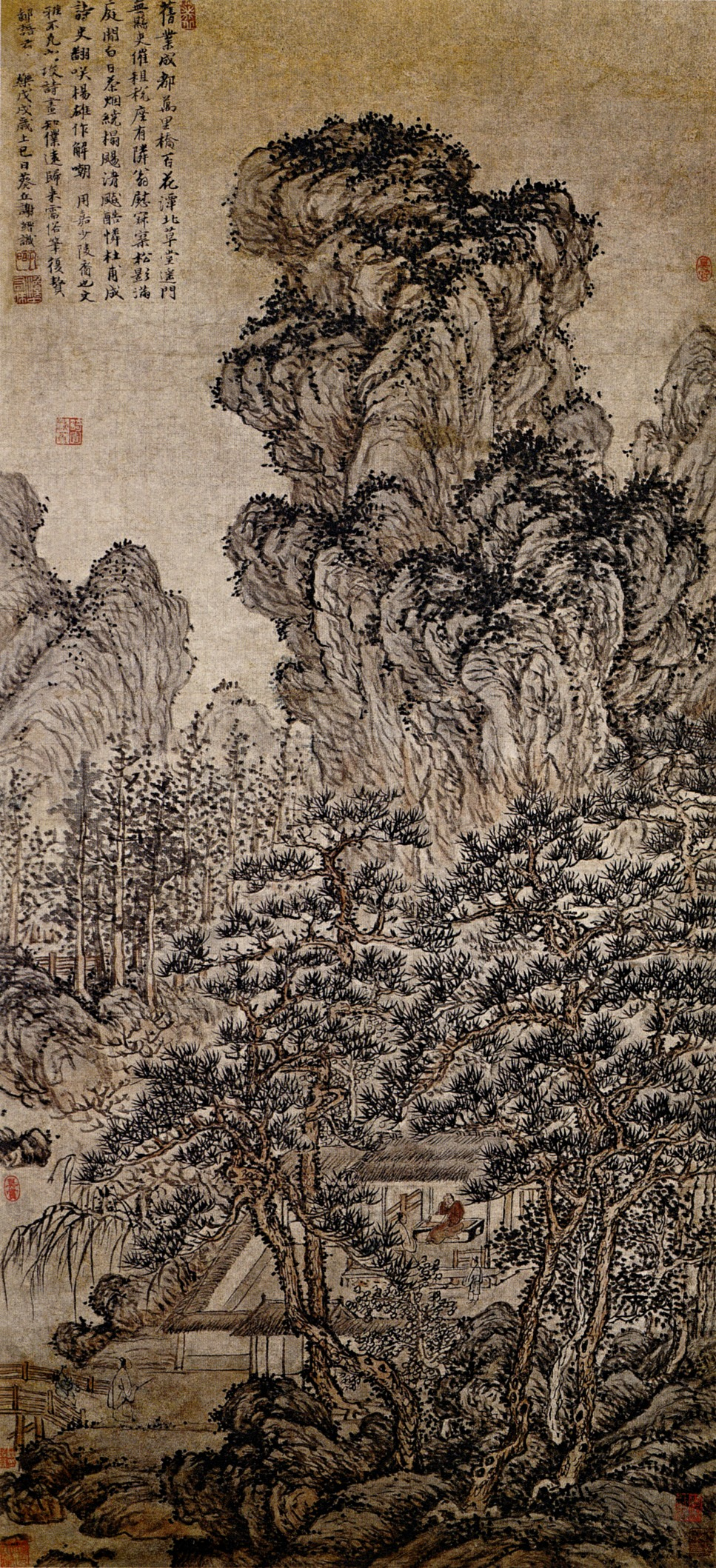
Du Qiong: Grass House North of the Pool, hanging scroll, 109.9 x 50.1 cm. 1418. Zhejiang Provincial Museum, China

Du Qiong (simplified Chinese: 杜琼; traditional Chinese: 杜瓊; pinyin: Dù Qióng; Wade–Giles: Tu Ch'iung); ca. 1396-1474 was a Chinese landscape painter, calligrapher and poet during the Ming dynasty (1368–1644).

Du was born in Suzhou, Jiangsu province and was a distant descendant of Dong Yuan. His style name was 'Using Excellence" (Yongjia, 用嘉) and his pseudonyms were 'Tiller of the Eastern Plaines" (Dongyuan gengzhe, 东原耕者) and 'Luguan Daoist' (Luguan daoren, 鹿冠道人). Du's style was distinctive though somewhat similar to that of Wang Meng. He often used a dry brush and light quantities of ink to achieve his effects. He was teacher to Shen Zhou.
