= Wen Zhengming =

Chinese painter, calligrapher, and poet (1470–1559)

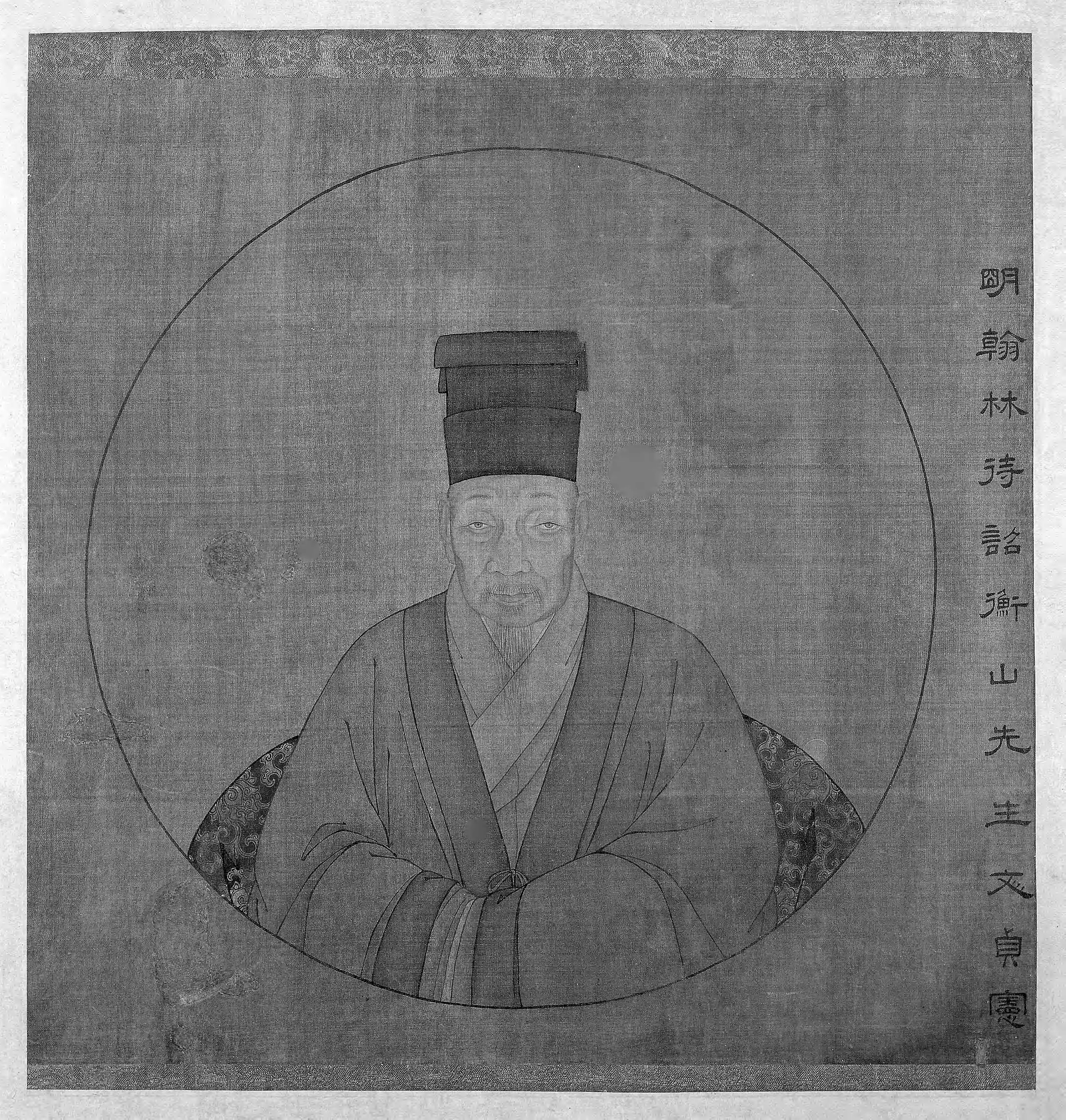
- Born: 28 November 1470
- Died: 1559 (aged 88–89)
- Education: Shen Zhou
- Known for: painting, calligraphy
- Movement: Wu School

Chinese name
- Traditional Chinese: 文徵明
- Simplified Chinese: 文征明
Transcriptions
Standard Mandarin
- Hanyu Pinyin: Wén Zhēngmíng
- Wade–Giles: Wen Cheng-ming
Yue: Cantonese
- Jyutping: Man^{4} Zing^{1} Ming^{4}

Wen Bi
- Chinese: 文壁
Transcriptions
Standard Mandarin
- Hanyu Pinyin: Wén bì
Yue: Cantonese
- Jyutping: Man^{4} Bik^{1}

Wen Zhengming (文徵明; 28 November 1470 – 28 March 1559), born Wen Bi (文璧), was a Chinese painter, calligrapher, and poet during the Ming dynasty. He was regarded as one of the Four Masters of Ming painting.

== Biography ==
Wen Zhengming was born Wen Bi near present-day Suzhou on 28 November 1470. He would later be known by his courtesy name, Zhengming. He had an elder brother, Wen Gui, who was born in 1469. When Zhengming was two years old, his father, Wen Lin, passed the imperial examination with the highest possible rank, jinshi. Wen Lin was assigned a government position as a magistrate in Yongjia County in Zhejiang province, and left for his job, leaving his two sons in the care of his wife, Qi Shenning. In 1476, Qi died of an illness at the age of 32. Wen Lin commissioned the noted scholar Li Dongyang to write an inscription for her tomb.

Wen Zhengming's family was originally from a line of military men who lived in Hengshan County, Hunan province. At the time of his great-great-grandfather Wen Dingcong, the family moved to the city of Changzhou in the Suzhou area. Zhengming was a distant relative of the Song dynasty official Wen Tianxiang, through an ancestor who lived in Hengshan. From this he derived his hao (art name), Hengshan, which he used to sign many of his works. His father Wen Lin and his grandfather Wen Hong (Gongda) were both interested in painting. Wen Lin was also a patron of Tang Yin, Wen Zhengming's contemporary and fellow member of the "Four Masters of the Ming dynasty".

In 1489, Wen Zhengming began studying under Shen Zhou, the eldest of the Four Masters and founder of the Wu school of Chinese painting, of which Wen himself later became a leading figure. Zhengming's father Wen Lin died in 1499, while working as prefect of Wenzhou. At Zhengming's request, Shen Zhou provided a written account of Wen Lin's life for the funeral.

Wen Zhengming married the daughter of a high-ranking official and jinshi named Wu Yu around the year 1490. Her uncle was the artist Xia Chang, whose paintings of bamboo may have influenced Wen's own work. Little is known about Wen's wife herself, whose personal name was not recorded. After she died in 1542, Wen painted Wintry Trees after Li Cheng for a guest who arrived with a gift to mourn her death.

Around 1509–1513, Wang Xianchen, a friend of the Wen family, began construction on the Humble Administrator's Garden, generally considered one of China's greatest classical gardens. The garden is the subject of some of Wen Zhengming's poems and paintings, including an album of thirty-one views painted in 1535 and a second of eight views in 1551.

Wen Zhengming's brother Wen Gui died in 1536. Zhengming's eldest son, Wen Peng, was a noted seal-engraver. His second son, Wen Jia, was also an artist, as was his nephew Wen Boren (son of Wen Gui). His great-grandson, Wen Zhenheng, a noted garden designer, rebuilt the Garden of Cultivation in Suzhou. His great-granddaughter, Wen Shu, was a popular and respected professional painter of flowers and insects.

== Style ==
Wen Zhengming was one of a number of Ming dynasty literati artists who set themselves in opposition to the professional, academy-influenced style favored in the region of Zhejiang. Wen and other amateur artists of the Wu school (named after the region around Suzhou, where many of them were based) carried on the wenren (Chinese: 文人) scholar-artist tradition of the preceding dynasties. Eschewing official sponsorship and hostile to the politics of the imperial court, these artists sought private patrons and the respect of their peers, frequently painting works in the style of older masters. Wen studied under the founder of the Wu school, Shen Zhou, whose style he was deeply influenced by. He sometimes added his own poetry to Shen Zhou's paintings, thereby benefitting from the latter's established reputation. After he achieved fame in his own right, Wen's many colophons to Shen Zhou's works often lent them authenticity in the eyes of collectors.

Wen and his mentor both revered the artists of the preceding Song and Yuan dynasties, though he rarely imitated them directly. He produced works in a number of styles, and has been called a "chameleon" whose works could easily be misidentified. Wen's paintings were highly sought after by wealthy collectors throughout the 16th century, and counterfeits of his works were common during the late Ming.

Wen Zhengming was also a prolific and well-known writer, whose poems often touched on the subject of painting. He regarded art and nature as being inseparable, and frequently wrote about and painted nature scenes, as well as private gardens such as the Humble Administrator's Garden.

In addition to his poetry and painting, Wen Zhengming was also known for his calligraphy. As a young man, Zhengming was introduced by his father Wen Lin to a leading calligrapher of the Suzhou area. By 1541, he was thought to be the greatest calligrapher in China, particularly in the kaishu (regular script) and xingshu (semi-cursive script) styles. In Ming China, calligraphy was regarded as a higher art form than painting and was believed to reflect the artist's personality and moral character. Wen Zhengming was admired for his perceived uprightness and integrity. As a calligrapher, his technique was influenced by that of the Song dynasty master Huang Tingjian.

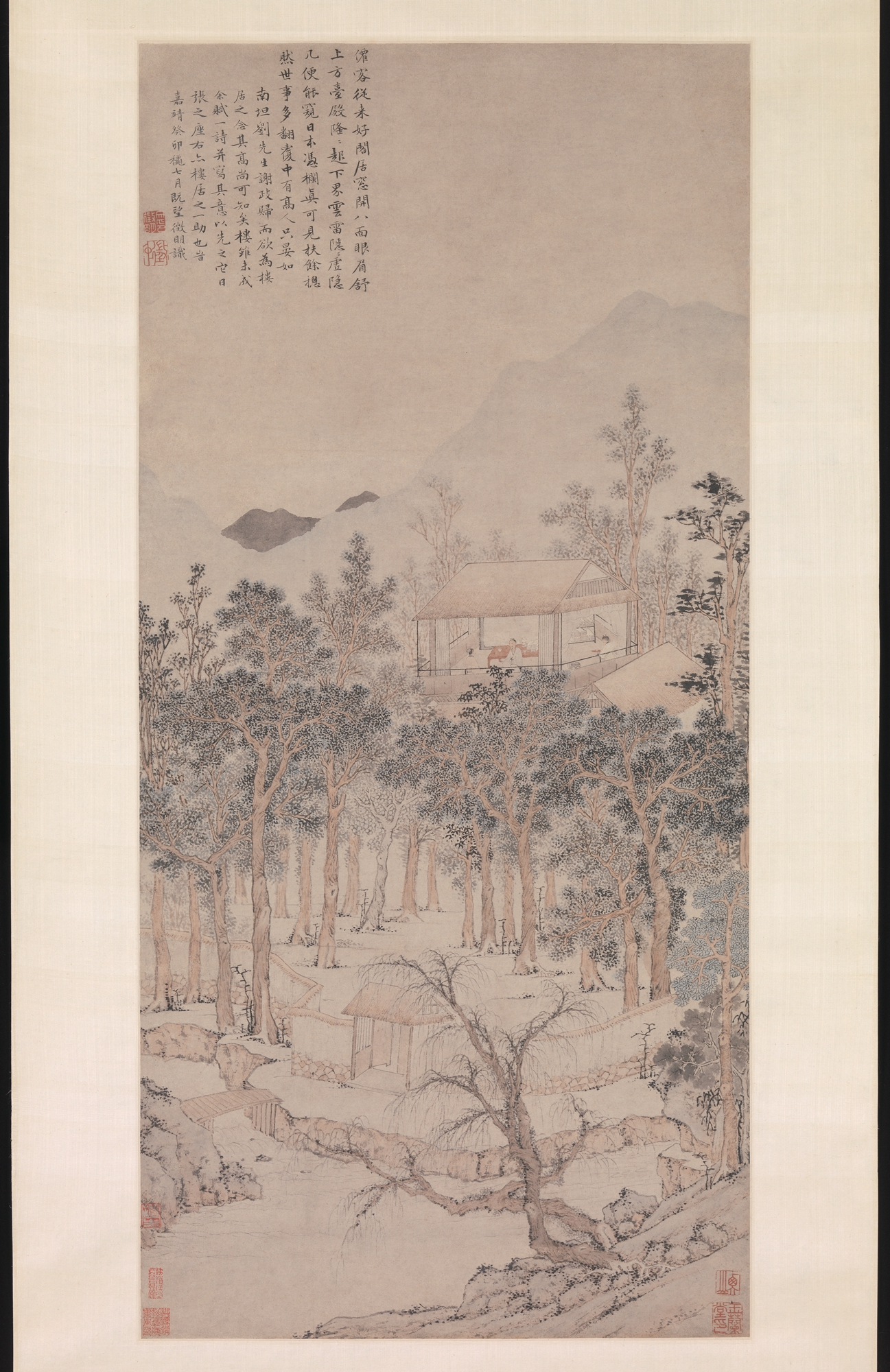
Living Aloft - Master Liu's Retreat

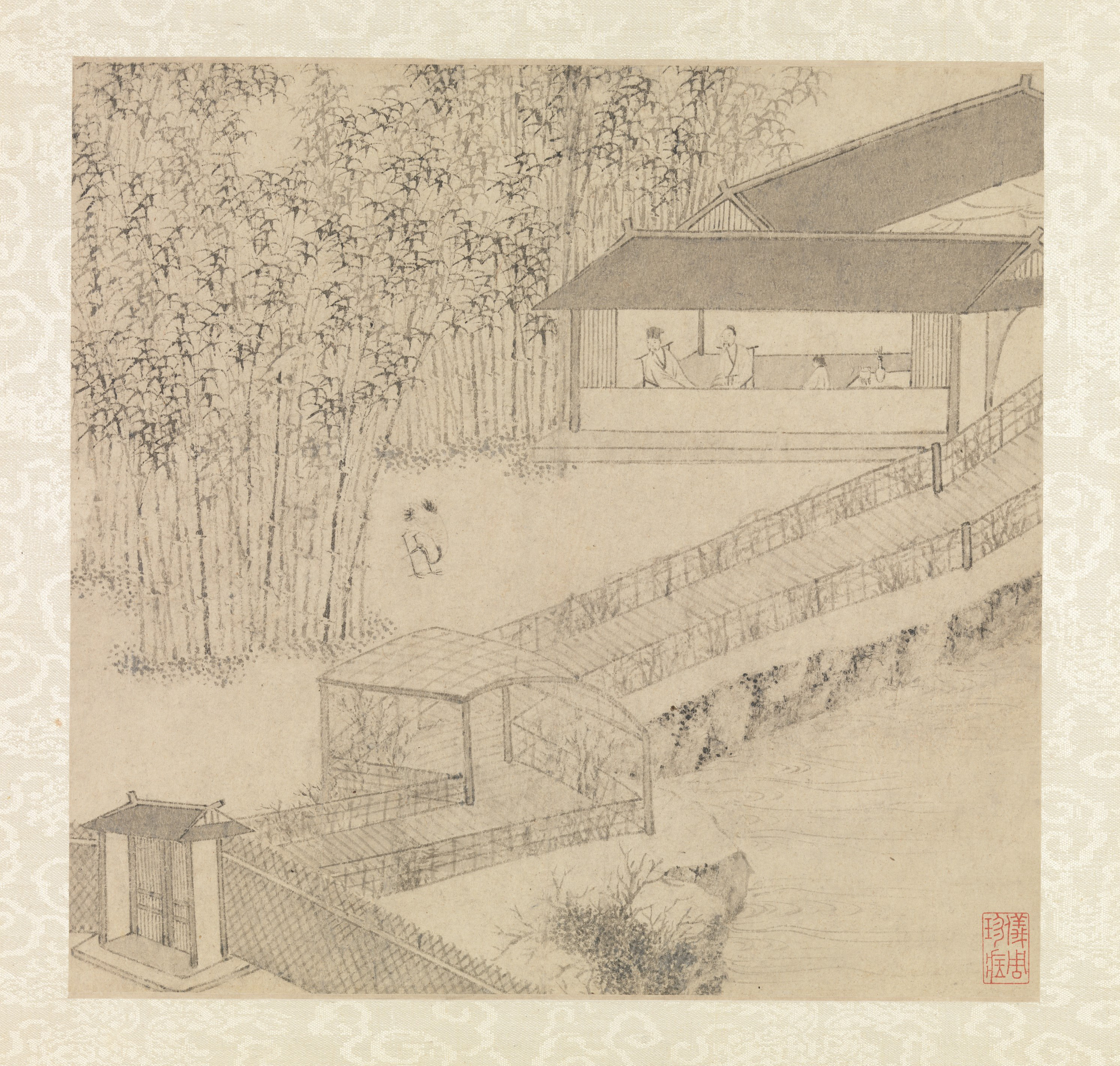
One of eight album leaves depicting the Humble Administrator's Garden, painted in 1551

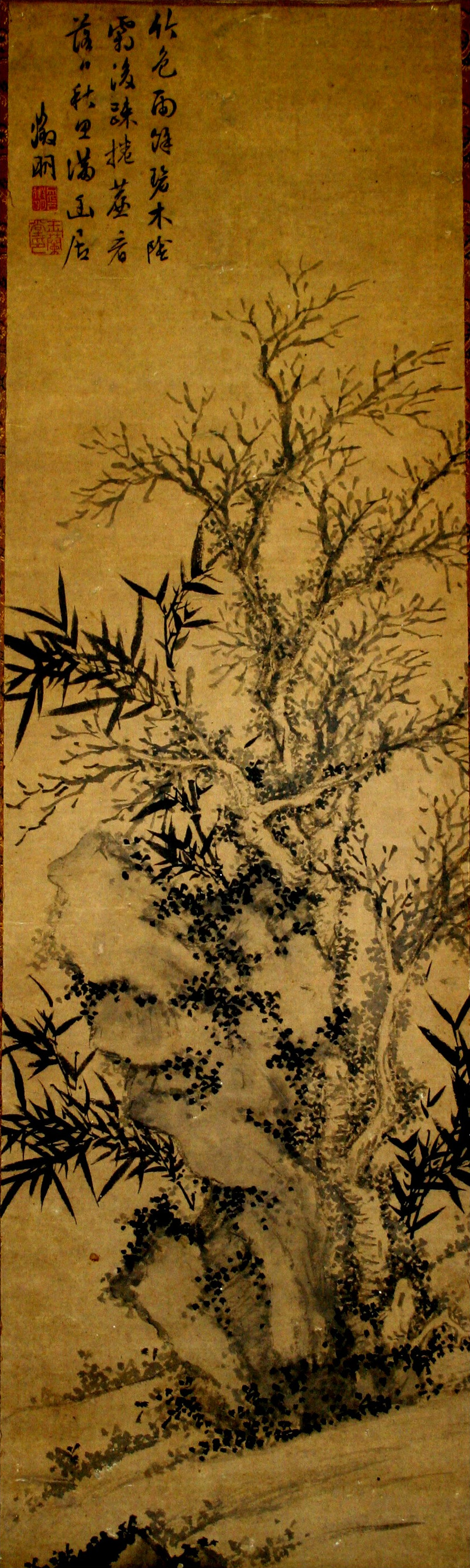

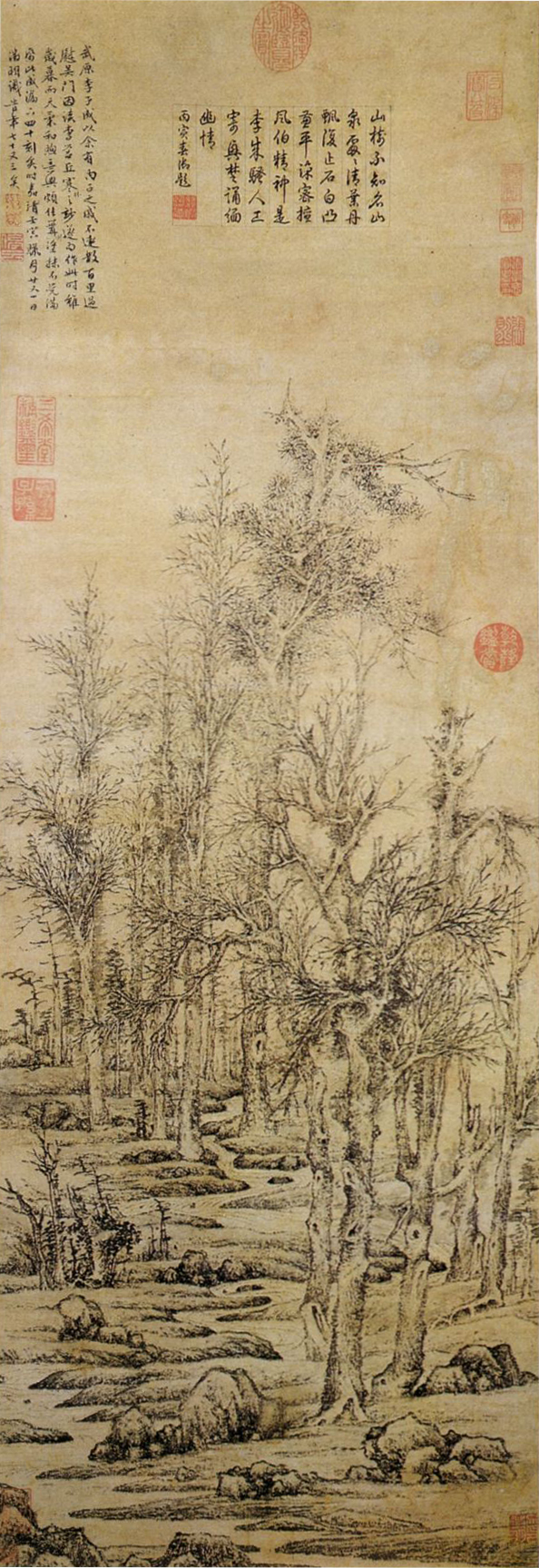
Wintry trees after Li Cheng

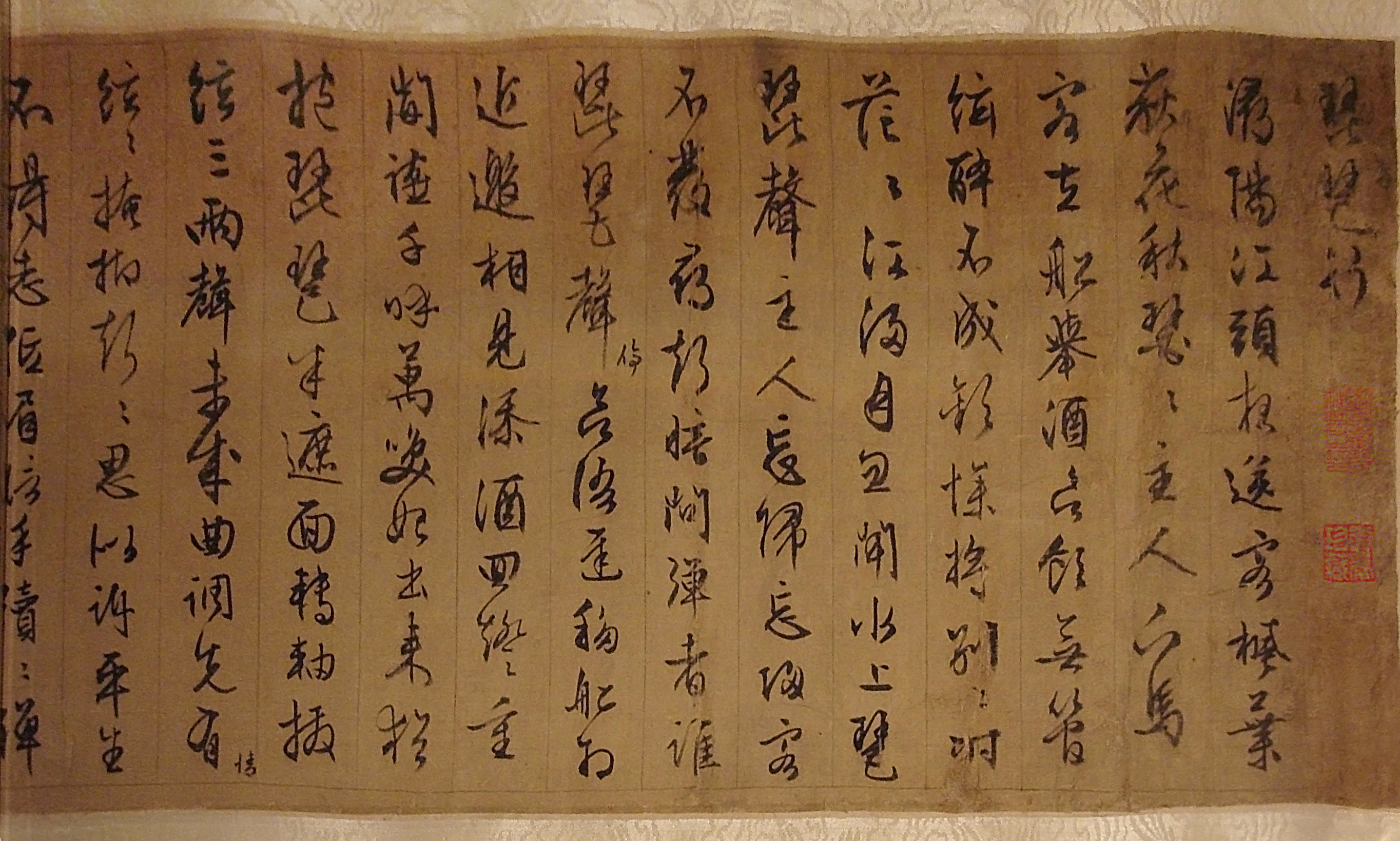
Pi Pa Xing in semi-cursive script

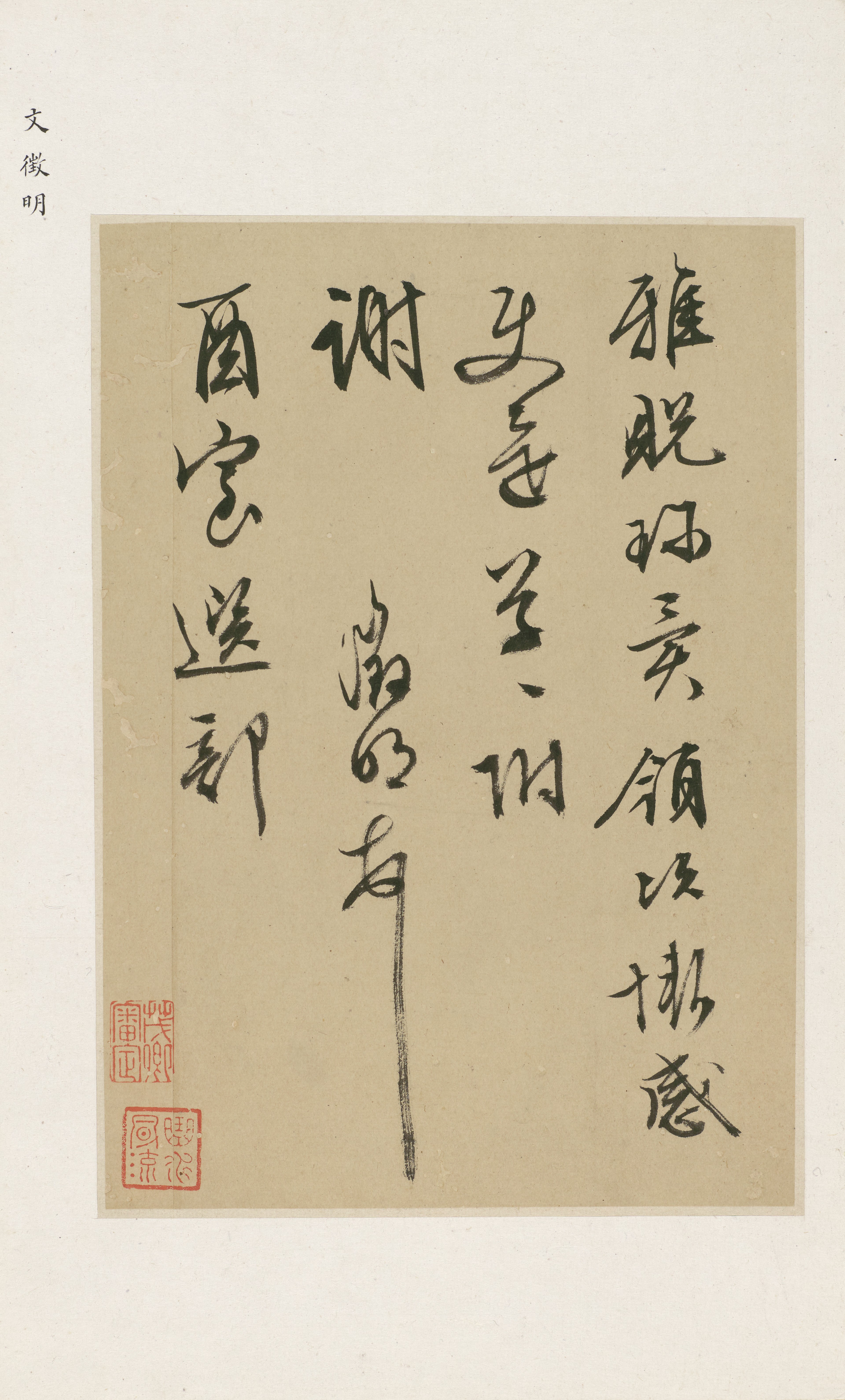
Calligraphy, Princeton University Art Museum

== Works cited ==
- Brook, Timothy (2010). The Troubled Empire: China in the Yuan and Ming Dynasties. Harvard University Press. ISBN 978-0-674-07253-4.
- Cai, Yanxin (2011). Chinese Architecture. Cambridge University Press. ISBN 978-0521186445.
- Chang, Kang-i Sun; Owen, Stephen, eds. (2010). The Cambridge History of Chinese Literature: From 1375. Cambridge University Press. ISBN 978-0521855594.
- Clunas, Craig (2004). Elegant Debts: The Social Art of Wen Zhengming, 1470-1559. University of Hawaii Press. ISBN 0824827724.
- Clunas, Craig (2013). Fruitful Sites: Garden Culture in Ming Dynasty China. Reaktion Books. ISBN 978-1780231587.
- Elkins, James (2010). Chinese Landscape Painting as Western Art History. Hong Kong University Press. ISBN 978-962-209-000-2.
- Levenson, Jay A. (1991). Circa 1492: Art in the Age of Exploration. Yale University Press. ISBN 0-300-05167-0.
- Sun, Weizu (2004). Chinese Seals: Carving Authority and Creating History. Long River Press. ISBN 1592650139.
- Watson, William (2000). The Arts of China: 900-1620. Yale University Press. ISBN 0300098359.
