= Wen Peng =

Chinese painter (1498–1573)

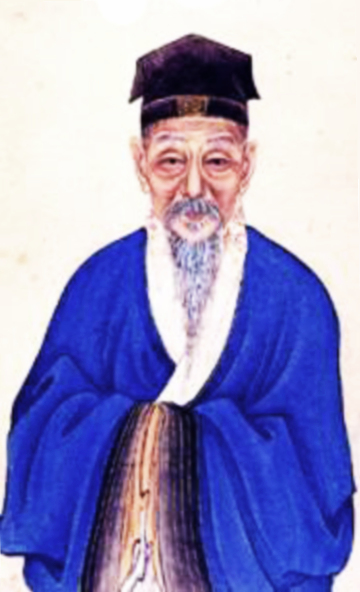
Wen Peng

Wen Peng (Chinese: 文彭; pinyin: Wén Péng, 1497–1573), also known as Shou Cheng and San Qiao, was a maker of personal seals during the Ming dynasty.

He was born in Shanghai and raised in Suzhou, the son of painter Wen Zhengming. Employed as a lecturer by the Guozijian (in both Beijing and Nanjing), he was widely regarded as the founder of modern seal-carving. Wen founded the Sanqiao (Wumen) School of seal engraving.

Wen worked originally in ivory, creating calligraphic designs that were incised into the material by his colleague Li Wenpu. However, after creating some experimental seals using soapstone, he switched to using stone for his work, and his later career focuses exclusively on this material. Prior to this, seals had been carved from ivory, bronze or pottery. Wen also developed the modern recipe for the red paste (Chinese: 朱砂; pinyin: zhūshā) used to create the seal's stamp; he recommended a mixture of ground cinnabar, castor oil and moxa. He Zhen, founder of the Huizhou (Xingyuang) school of seal-engraving, was Wen's student.
