= Wu Wei (painter) =

Chinese painter (1459–1508)

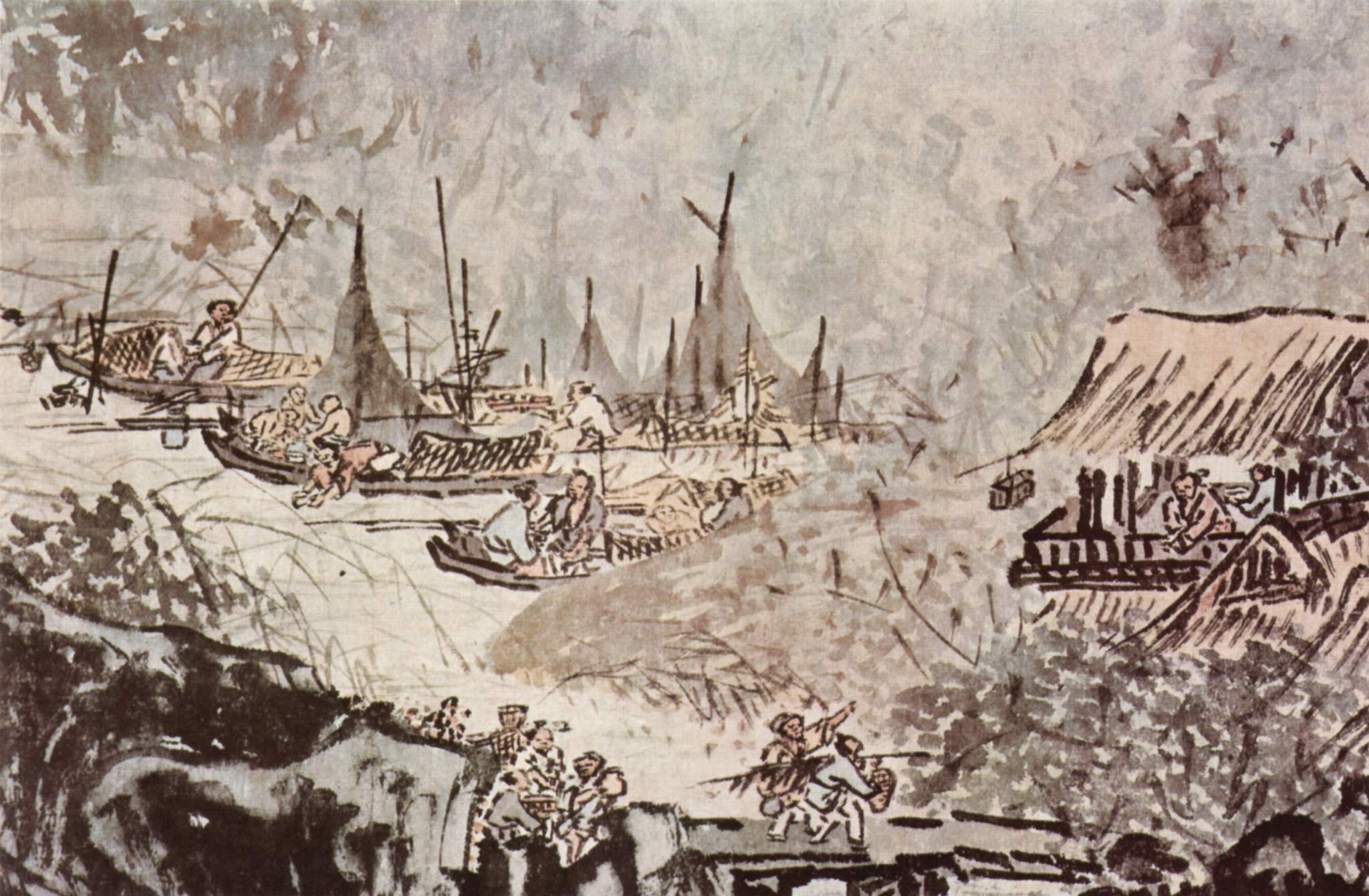
Wu Wei, Celebration at the Fishing Village

Wu Wei (traditional Chinese: 吳偉; simplified Chinese: 吴伟; pinyin: Wú Wěi; ca. 1459–1508) was a painter of Ming dynasty (1368–1644) China famous for his landscapes.

Wu was born in Wuchang in Hubei province. His style names were Shiying and Ciweng, and his sobriquets were Lufu and Xiaoxian.

Although he was born into a family of scholar-officials and might have pursued a career in the bureaucracy, Wu Wei instead chose to support himself as a painter. He worked as a professional painter in the city of Nanjing, and three emperors summoned him to work as a court painter in Beijing: the Chenghua emperor (r. 1465–87), the Hongzhi emperor (r. 1488–1505), and the Zhengde emperor (r. 1506–21).

Wu Wei is known as a landscape painter, and, at least early in his career, he was inspired by the work of Dai Jin (1388–1462). He also painted figures. Wu painted in a strong, fluent, and uninhibited style, and took on many students to teach.
