= Shen Zhou =

Chinese painter (1427–1509)

- Born: Xiangcheng, Suzhou, China; 1427; Xiangcheng, Jiangsu
- Died: 1509 (aged 81–82)
- Known for: Shan shui
- Movement: Wu School, Four Masters of the Ming dynasty

Shen Zhou
- Chinese: 沈周
Transcriptions
Standard Mandarin
- Hanyu Pinyin: Shěn Zhōu
- Bopomofo: ㄕㄣˇ ㄓㄡ
- Wade–Giles: Shen^{3} Chou^{1}
- IPA: [ʂə̀n.ʈʂóʊ]
Yue: Cantonese
- Yale Romanization: Sám Jāu
- Jyutping: sam2 zau1
- IPA: [sɐm˧˥.tsɐw˥]

Shen Qinan
- Traditional Chinese: 沈啟南
- Simplified Chinese: 沈启南
Transcriptions
Standard Mandarin
- Hanyu Pinyin: Shěn Qǐnán
- Bopomofo: ㄕㄣˇ ㄑㄧˇ ㄋㄢˊ
- Wade–Giles: Shen^{3} Ch‘i^{3}-nan^{2}
- IPA: [ʂə̀n.tɕʰì.nǎn]
Yue: Cantonese
- Yale Romanization: Sám Káinàahm
- Jyutping: sam2 kai2 naam4
- IPA: [sɐm˧˥.kʰɐj˧˥.nam˩]

Shen Shitian
- Chinese: 沈石田
Transcriptions
Standard Mandarin
- Hanyu Pinyin: Shěn Shítián
- Bopomofo: ㄕㄣˇ ㄕˊ ㄊㄧㄢˊ
- Wade–Giles: Shen^{3} Shih^{2}-t‘ian^{2}
- IPA: [ʂə̀n.ʂɨ̌.tʰjɛ̌n]
Yue: Cantonese
- Yale Romanization: Sám Sehktìhn
- Jyutping: sam2 sek6 tin4
- IPA: [sɐm˧˥.sɛk̚˨.tʰin˩]

Shen Zhou (Chinese: 沈周; pinyin: Shěn Zhōu, 1427–1509), courtesy names Qinan (启南) and Shitian (石田), was a Chinese painter in the Ming dynasty. He lived during the post-transition period of the Yuan conquest by the Ming. His family worked closely with the government and maintained its wealthy status. Shen later retired and lived a reclusive life, spending most of his time painting and taking care of his widowed mother.

He was a contributor to the more individualist Wu School of Chinese art. Besides painting, he was also accomplished in history and the classics.

== Life ==
Shen Zhou was born into a wealthy family in Xiangcheng, near the thriving city of Suzhou, in the Jiangsu province, China. His genealogy traces his family's wealth to the late Yuan period, but only as far as Shen's paternal great-grandfather, Shen Liang-ch’en, who became a wealthy landowner following the dissolution of Mongol rule.

After the collapse of the Yuan and the emergence of the new Ming dynasty, the position of tax collector was assigned to the head of the Shen family, under the Hongwu emperor's new lijia system. This steadily and amply increased the family's wealth, while freeing Shen Liang-ch’en's male descendants from obligatory careers as Ming officials, and allowing them to live the majority of their lives as retired scholar-artists. Upon the death of his father, Shen Heng-chi, Shen Zhou decided to forgo official examinations and devote his life to the care of his widowed mother, Chang Su-wan.

It is probable that he never intended to become an official, but refrained from making this obvious until his father had died. He thus renounced the life of official service while still preserving his reputation in an enduring act of filial piety. In this way, he was able to live a reclusive life, free of responsibility (except that of caring for his mother), and devote his time to artwork, socializing, and monastic contemplation of the natural world around him. Shen was privileged that he could paint what he wanted, since he was rich and therefore did not require a wealthy patron and sponsor.

== Cultural and historical context ==
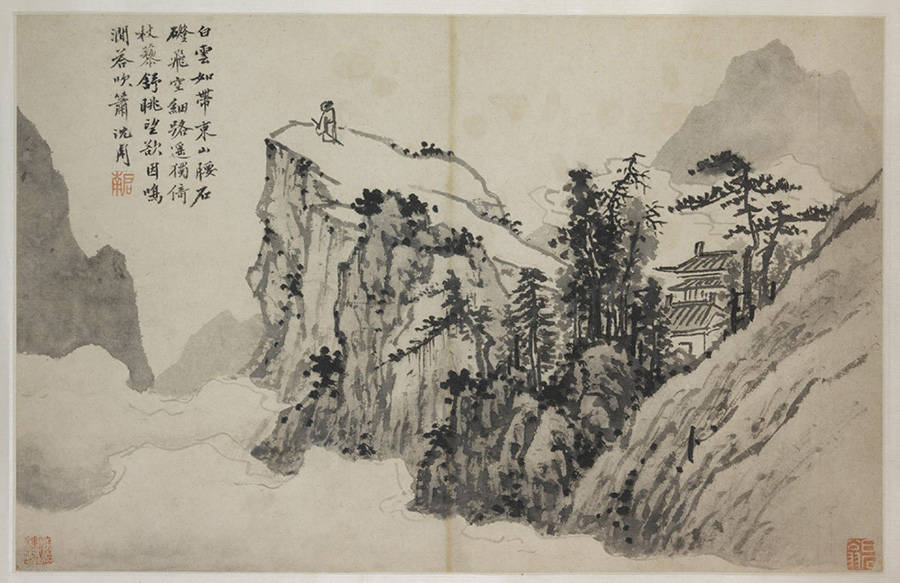
Poet on a Mountaintop

Shen Zhou lived at a pivotal point in the history of Chinese painting, and contributed greatly to the artistic tradition of China, founding the new Wu School in Suzhou. Under the Yuan dynasty (1279–1368), painters had practiced with relative freedom, cultivating a more “individualist,” innovative approach to art that deviated noticeably from the more superficial style of the Song masters who preceded them. However, at the outset of the Ming, the Hongwu emperor (reg 1368–1398) decided to import the existing master painters to his court in Nanjing, where he had the ability to cultivate their styles to conform to the paintings of the Song masters. As Hongwu was notorious for his attempts to marginalize and persecute the scholar class, this was seen as an attempt to banish the gentry's influence from the arts.

The dominant style of the Ming court painters was called the Zhe School. However, following the ascension of the Yongle emperor (reg 1403–1424), the capital was moved from Nanjing to Beijing, putting a large distance between imperial influence and Shen's city of Suzhou, which was nearby Nanjing. These new conditions led to the rise of the Wu School of painting, a somewhat subversive style that revived the ideal of the inspired scholar-painter in Ming China.

== Work ==
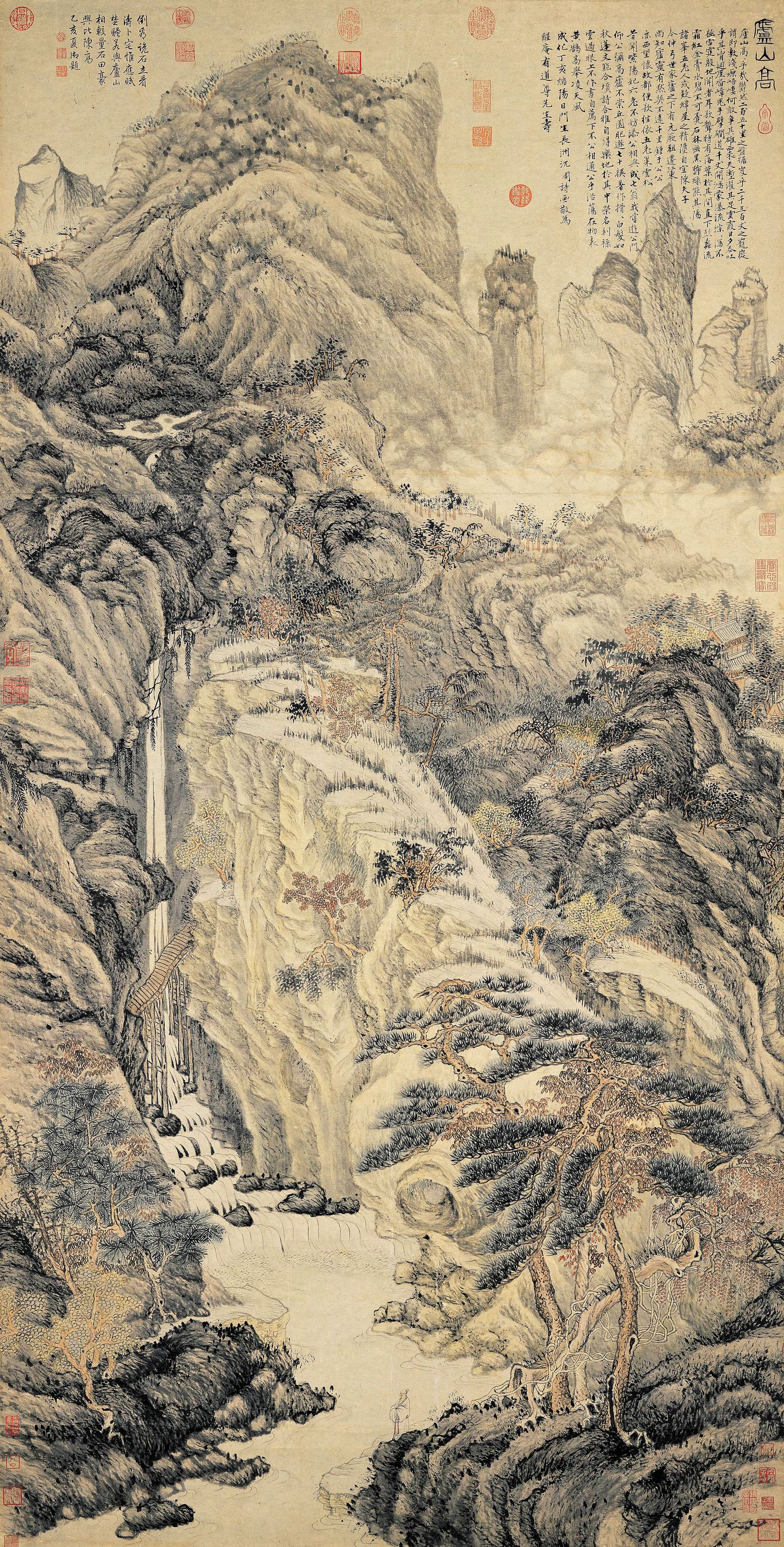
Lofty Mt. Lu by Shen Zhou. 1467, Hanging scroll, 6′ × 3′. National Palace Museum, Taipei.

Shen Zhou's scholarly upbringing and artistic training had instilled in him a reverence for China's historical tradition that influenced both his life and his art from an early age. He was accomplished in history and the classics, and his paintings reveal a disciplined obedience to the styles of the Yuan dynasty, to China's history, and to the orthodox Confucianism that he embodied in his filial life. He is most famous for his landscapes and for his "boneless" renderings of flowers, which are meticulously created in the style of the Yuan masters. However, he did not always paint within strict boundaries.

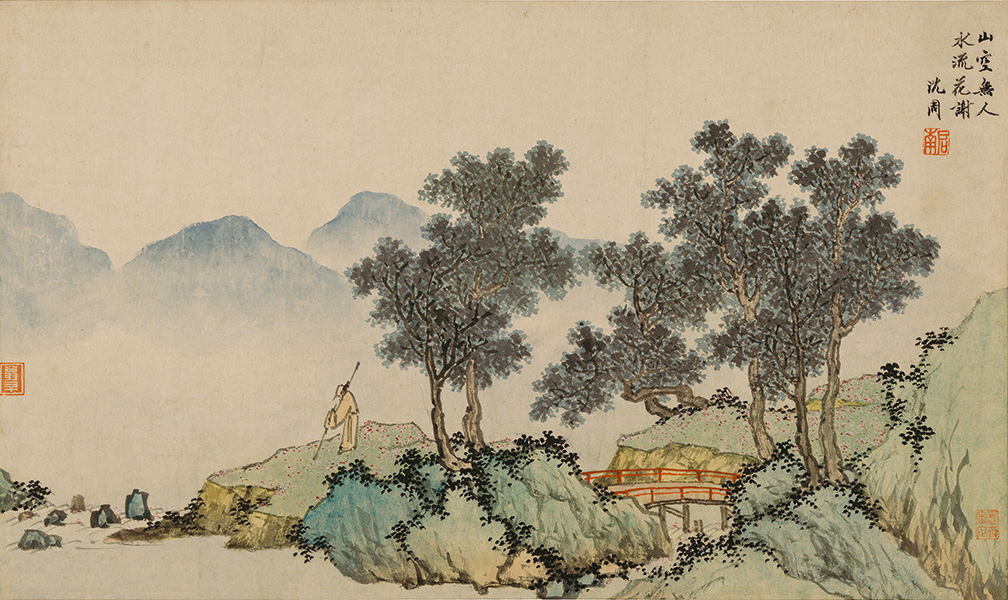
Poetic Feeling of Fallen Flowers by Shen Zhou. Album leaf, ink and color on paper, 35.9 x 60.1 cm. Nanjing Museum, China.

Shen possessed a large collection of paintings from the late Yuan and early Ming, which he and his scholar-painter colleagues used as models in forging the revivalist approach of the Wu style. He frequently combined experimental elements with the more rigid styles of the Yuan masters. Much of his work was done in collaboration with others, combining painting, poetry, and calligraphy at gatherings with his literati friends. It was upon these ideals that his Wu School was founded. For Wu painters, painting was a meditation, rather than an occupation. Shen Zhou never coveted his paintings, although they were frequently coveted and imitated by others. Through Shen Zhou's eyes, a painting was not a commodity, but the very extension of the painter himself.

His paintings depict soaring mountains and towering trees, while human works are reduced to specks in this immensity. This was made to make nature feel all empowering while dwarfing the human element. His most famous work from 1487, Rainy Thoughts (now in the National Palace Museum, Taipei), shows the rain dominating the composition while an insignificant house blurs with the mountains that towers over it. He is usually contrasted with Wu Wei, a painter that places humankind as the center of attention in his paintings.

This artist should not be confused with another Chinese artist named Shen Zhou who lived in 1848–1903.
