= He Zhen (artist) =

Chinese artist (1541–1606)

He Zhen, also known as Zhou Cheng, Chang Qing, Xue Yu (1541 – 1606) was a Chinese artist during the Ming dynasty, who specialised in carving personal seals. Along with his teacher Wen Peng, he was one of the first seal-engravers to use soapstone as a medium for his work.

He Zhen was from Wuyuan County, but spent much of his time in Nanjing. He had a wide-ranging influence, and founded the Huizhou (Xingyuang) or Wan (Anhui) school of seal-carving.

He's work aspired to an antique, ancient appearance, and he was known to chip or otherwise artificially weather his seals to create the impression of age. He created this effect by exploiting natural fracture lines in the stone, or by emphasising the knife-marks made whilst incising the inscription. His calligraphy attempted to echo that of the Han dynasty, and he used the simplicity of that script to ameliorate the elaborate stylistic flourishes of the popular Yuan-style calligraphy that had previously been used for Ming-era seals.
