= Zhe school (painting) =

Ming dynasty Chinese school of painters

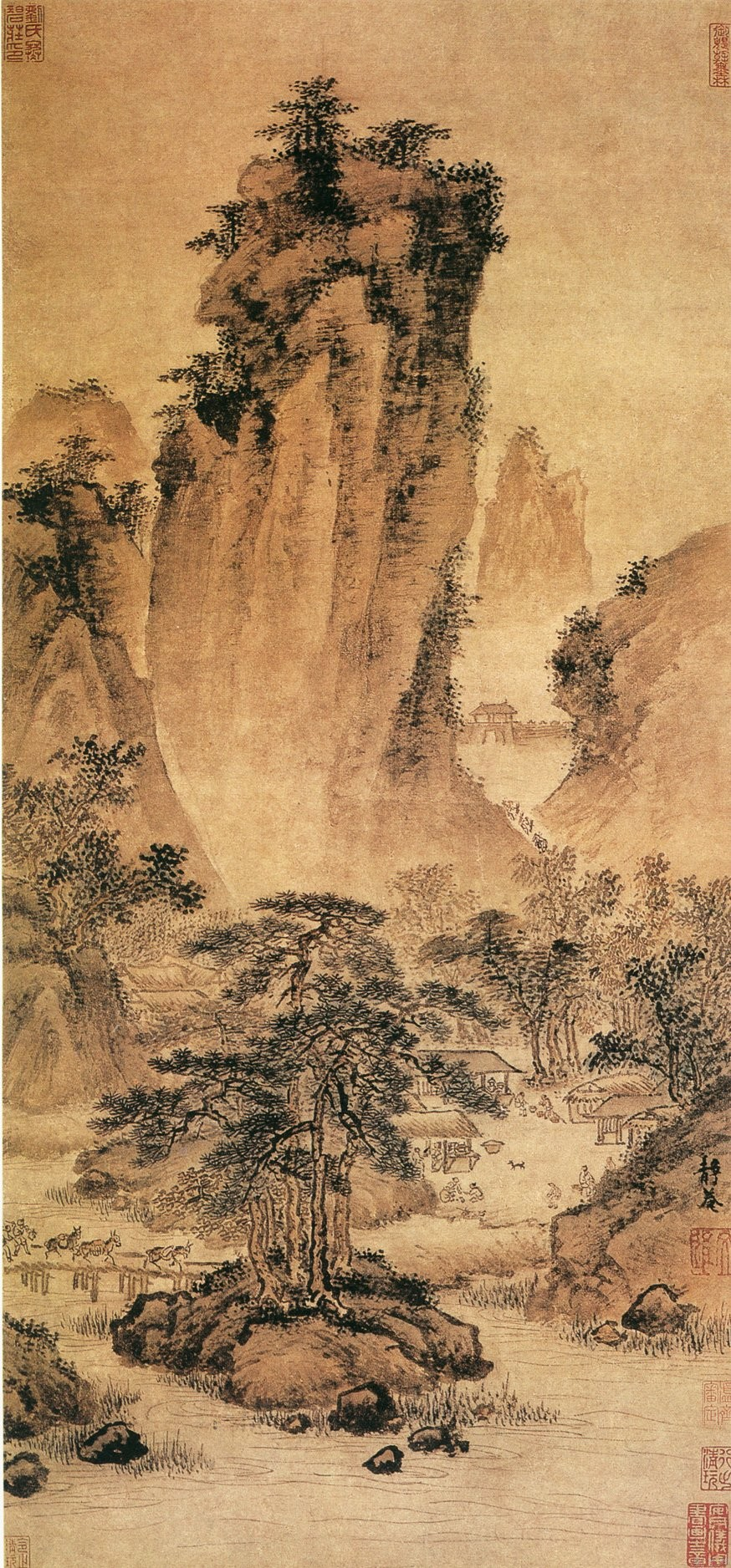
Dai Jin, considered the founder of the school, Travellers Through Mountain Passes

The Zhe school (Chinese: 浙派, zhè pài) was a school of painters and was part of the Southern School, which thrived during the Ming dynasty. The school was led by Dai Jin, traditionally considered its founder. The "Zhe" of the name refers to Dai Jin's home province – Zhejiang. The school was not a school in the proper sense of the word in that the painters did not formulate a new distinctive style, preferring instead to further the style of the Southern Song, specializing in decorative and large paintings. Instead, the school was identified by the formal, academic and conservative outlook, being a revival in the early Ming dynasty of the Ma-Xia (Ma Yuan and Xia Gui), 'academic', style of painting landscapes of the Southern Song.

== See also ==
- Wu School – "Amateur" artists as opposed to the professionals of the Zhe School
- Chinese painting
- Southern School of which the Wu and Zhe schools are a part
