= Dai Jin =

Chinese landscape painter (1388–1462)

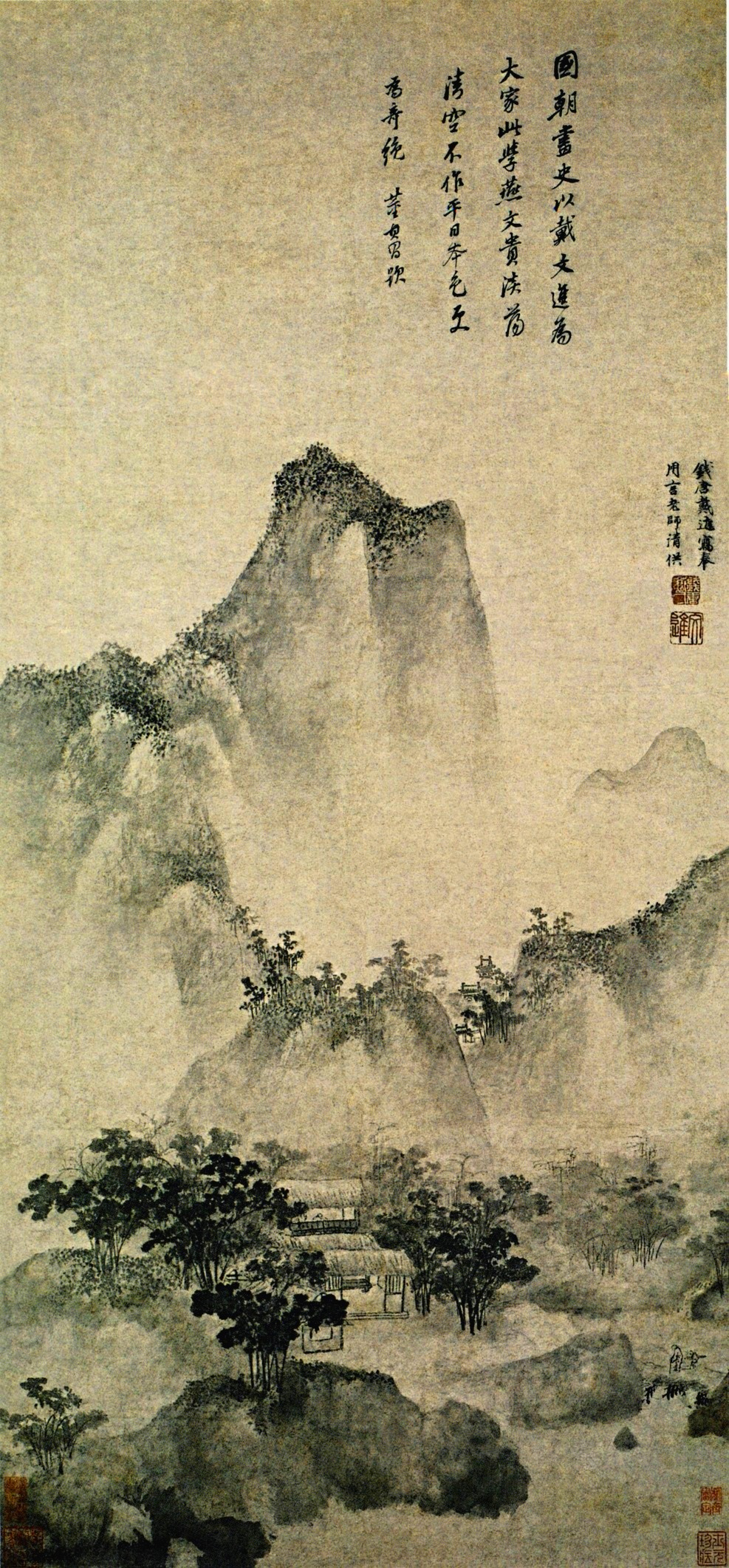
Dai Jin, "Landscape in the Style of Yan Wengui", Early Ming dynasty (1368-1644); a Chinese landscape painting using "atmospheric perspective" to show recession in space.

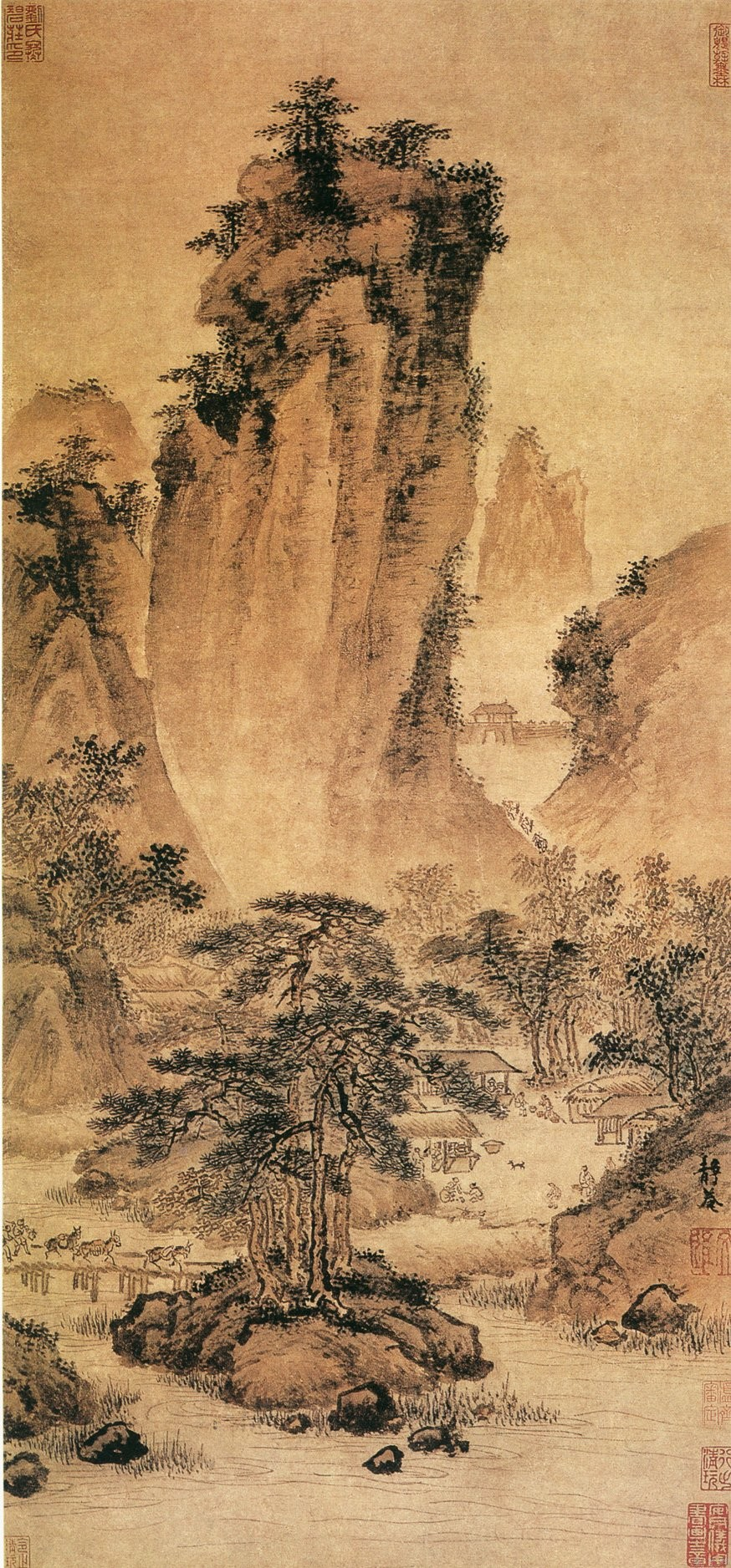
"Travelers Through Mountain Passes" (关山行旅图), Dai Jin, Ming dynasty, China, Palace Museum, Beijing. Hanging scroll, ink and color on paper. 61.8 x 29.7 cm.

Dai Jin (simplified Chinese: 戴进; traditional Chinese: 戴進; pinyin: Dài Jìn; 1388–1462) was a prominent leader in the early Ming Revival of the Ma-Xia, or too the style of landscape painting of the Southern Song, which came to be known as the Zhe School.

== Biography ==
An account by Lang Ying (b. 1487) provides the most extensive early biography of Dai Jin. As a young man, probably in the 1410s, Dai traveled to the capital, Nanjing, with his father, who presumably worked there in some official capacity. Dai failed to make a name for himself in the capital and returned to Qiantang to resume his study of painting, which he had probably begun with a local Zhejiang artisan. His reputation grew such that c. 1425 he was recommended to Xuande Emperor (r. 1425–35), and he went to Beijing in the hope of securing an academy appointment. His plans were thwarted, however, by the envy of established painters, in particular Xie Huan (fl c. 1368–1435), a favorite artist and adviser to the Xuande Emperor, who claimed to detect anti-government bias in Dai's works. Unrolling a series of Dai's landscapes representing the four seasons, Xie remarked approvingly on the spring and summer scenes but took severe exception to the autumn scene, in which the artist had depicted a fisherman wearing a red coat, attire thought suitable for gentlemen–officials but not for commoners. Yuan dynasty (1279–1368) artists had sometimes painted scholars dressed as fishermen, implying thereby that the educated classes deliberately avoided service under their Mongol rulers. Xie adduced as evidence another of Dai's works, Seven Worthies Passing the Barrier (c. 1425–35; untraced), which was based on an old tale (gushi) recounting the flight of seven men from a tumultuous and badly ruled state. The Xuande Emperor agreed with Xie, and according to scholar Lang Ying, the eunuch responsible for recommending Dai was executed. Dai, however, escaped at night to Hangzhou. Dai returned to the Zhe academy afterward.

== Sources ==
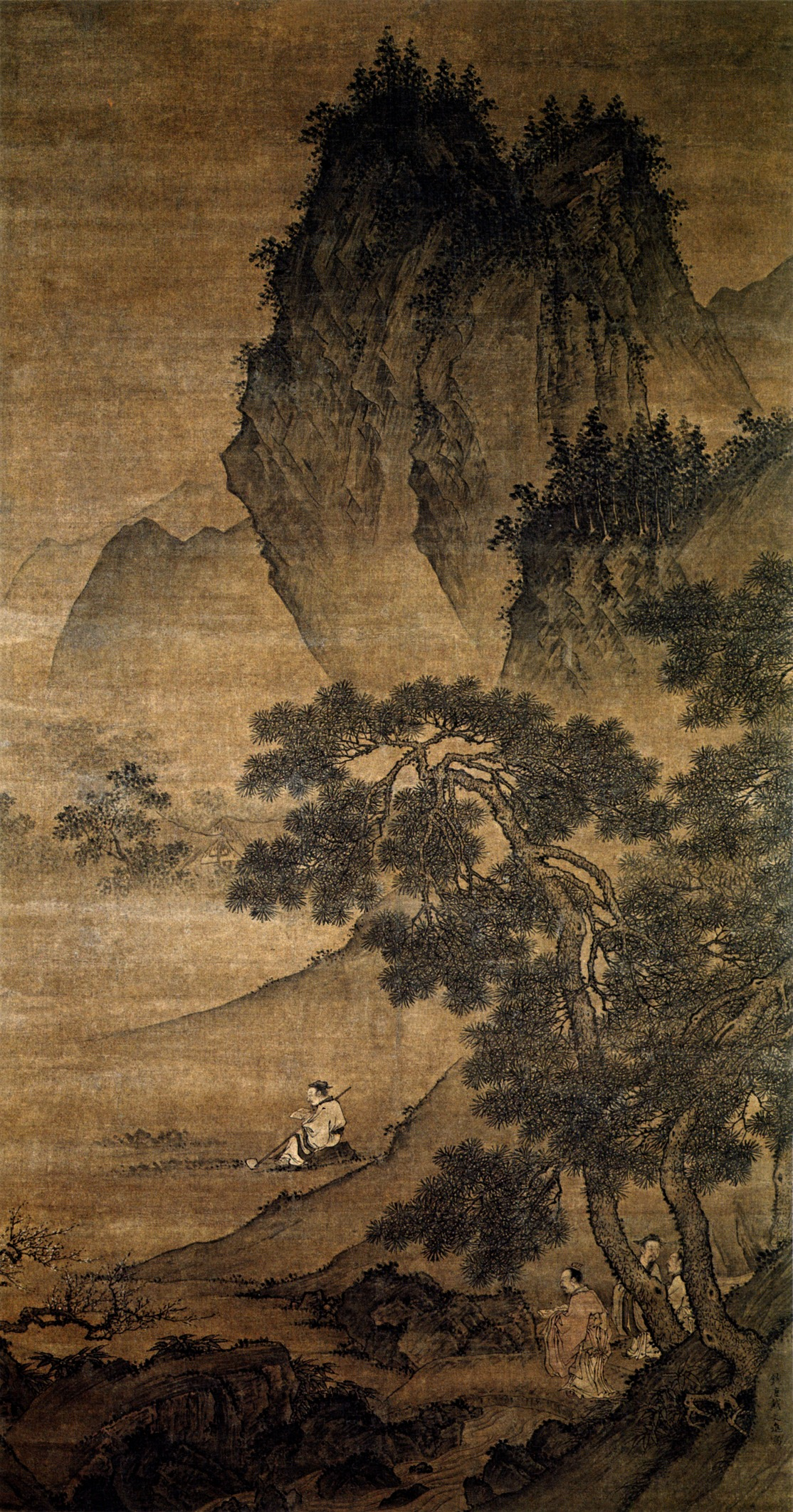
Dai Jin, Employing Virtue

- Masterpieces of Chinese Art (page 100), by Rhonda and Jeffrey Cooper, Todtri Productions, 1997. ISBN 1-57717-060-1
