= Wu School =

School of Chinese painting

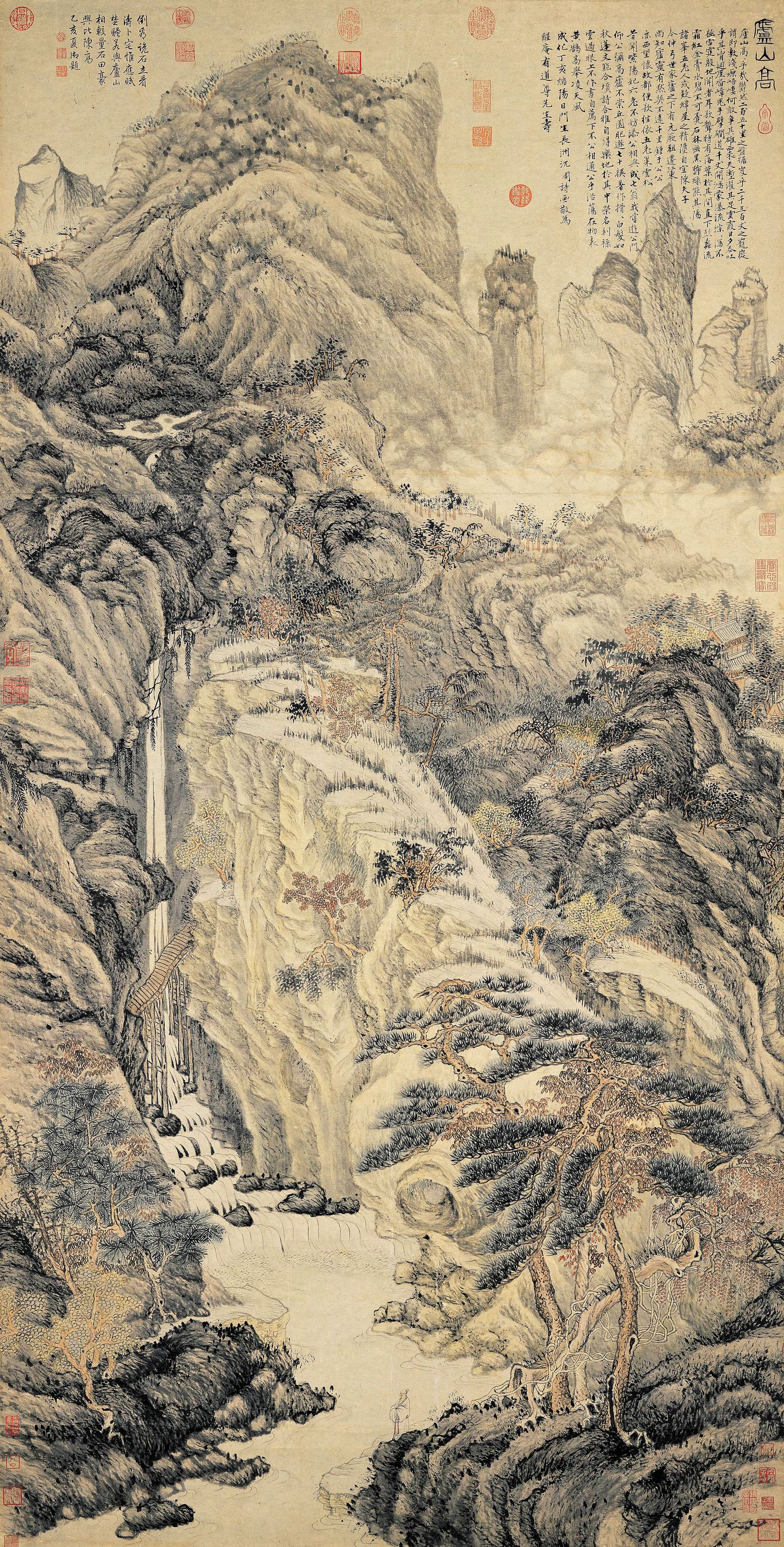
Lofty Mt. Lu by Shen Zhou

Wu or Wumen School (Chinese: 吳門畫派) is a group of painters of the Southern School during the Ming period of Chinese history. It was not an academy or educational institution, but rather a group united largely by the artistic theories of its members. Often classified as Literati, scholars, or amateur painters (as opposed to professionals), members idealized the concepts of personalizing works and integrating the artists into the art. A Wu School painting is characterized by inscriptions describing the painting, the date, method, or reason for the work, which is usually seen as a vehicle for personal expression. Shen Zhou (1427–1509) is usually cited as the founder of the Wu School.

The Zhe School is usually referenced in opposition to the Wu School.

== See also ==
- Chinese painting
- Southern School of which the Wu School is a part
- Zhe School – another group within the Southern School
