= Danqing =

Form of traditional Chinese painting

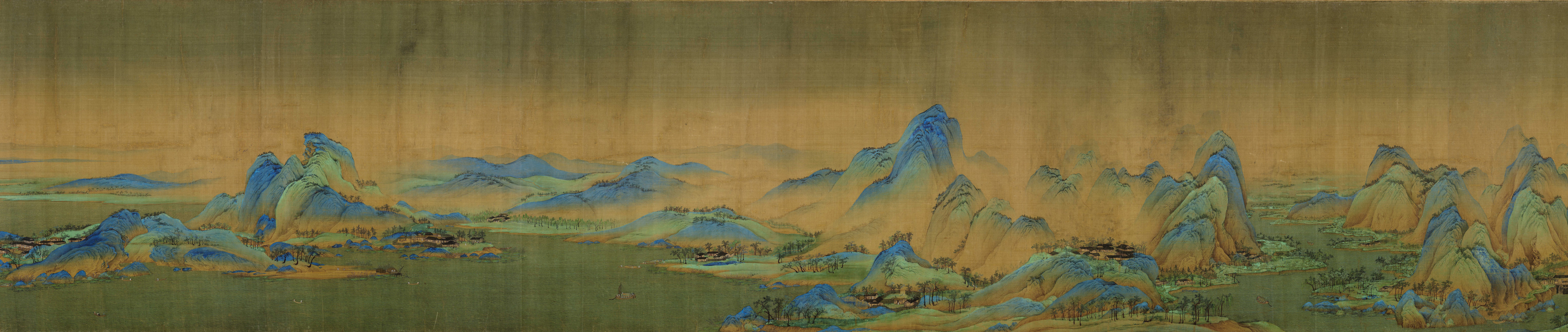
- A section of Wang Ximeng's "A Thousand Li of Rivers and Mountains" on silk, 1113 AD
- Chinese: 丹青
- Literal meaning: "red and blue-green", or "red and blue"
Transcriptions
Standard Mandarin
- Hanyu Pinyin: dān qīng
- Wade–Giles: Tan Ch'ing

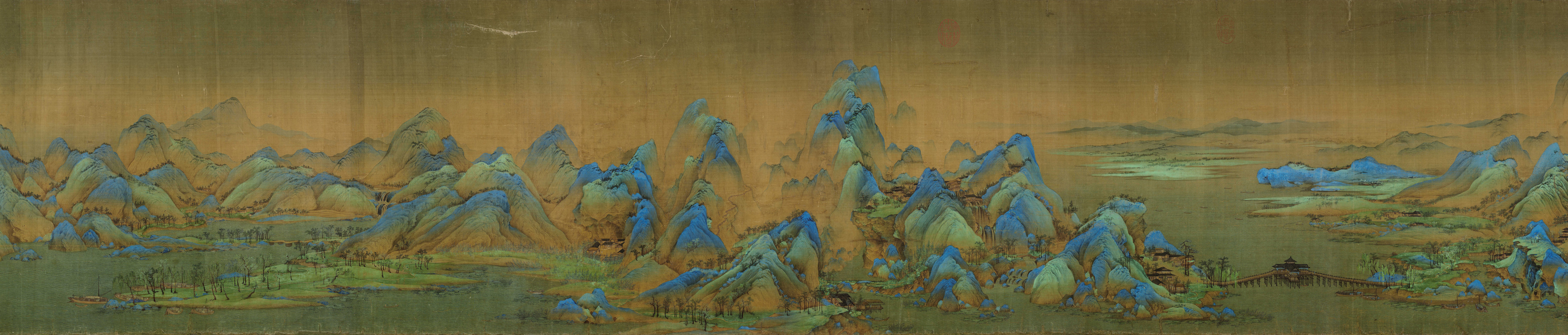
Danqing painting, A section of Wang Ximeng's A Thousand Li of Rivers and Mountains (千里江山圖).

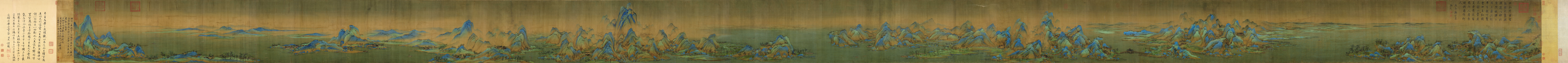
Danqing painting, Complete Wang Ximeng's A Thousand Li of Rivers and Mountains.

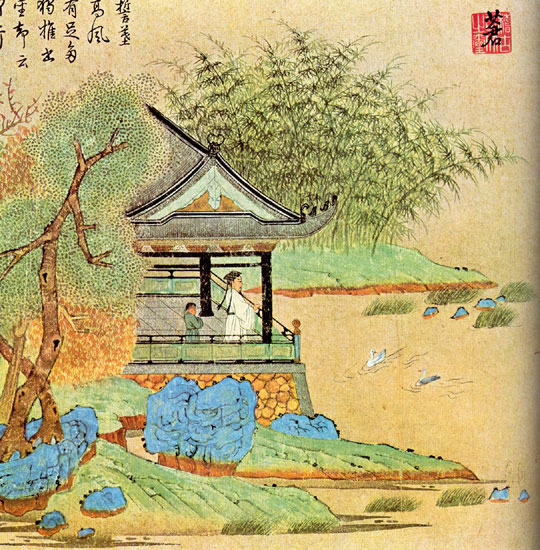
Danqing painting, Qian Xuan's Wang Xizhi Watching Geese (王羲之觀鵝圖).

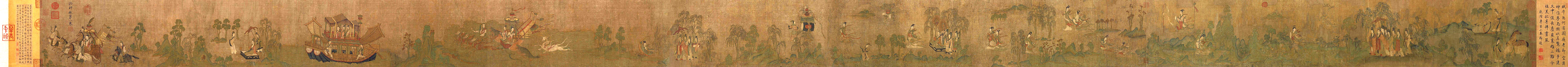
Danqing painting, Gu Kaizhi's Nymph of the Luo River (洛神賦).

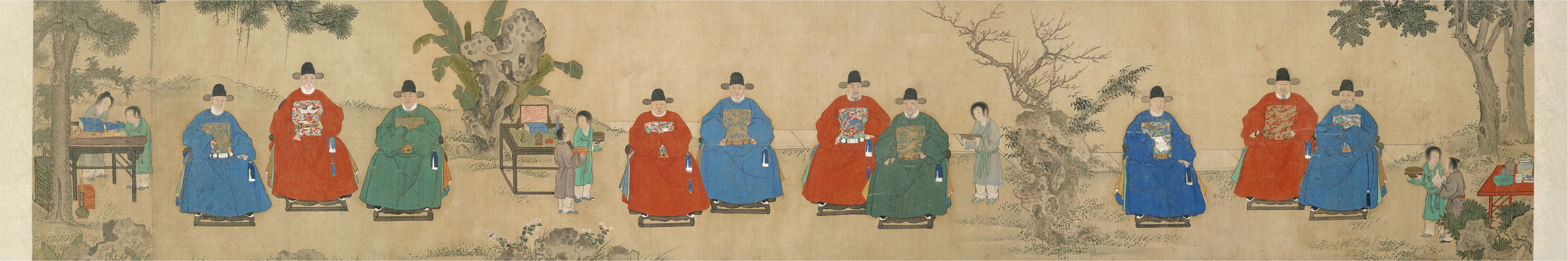
Danqing painting, Ten Officials Who Passed the Imperial Examination in the Same Year of 1464 (甲申十同年圖)).

In Chinese painting, danqing (Chinese: 丹青; pinyin: dān qīng) refers to paintings on silk and Xuan paper. Danqing is painted with an ink brush, color ink, or Chinese pigments using natural plant, mineral, and both metal pigments and pigment blends. Danqing literally means "red and blue-green" in Chinese, or more academically, "vermillion and cyan"; they are two of the most used colors in ancient Chinese painting.

Danqing is typically colorful and vibrant, and uses different colors to depict vivid landscapes, scenery, figures, portraits, plants, and animals. Some of the fundamental colors used in danqing are white, yellow, red, blue-green, and black.

The origin of the word danqing comes from the combination of the Chinese characters dan (丹) and qing (青). Dan (丹) refers to dansha (丹砂, lit. cinnabar), a red or vermillion mineral pigment, and qing (青) refers to qingyu (青雘), a cyan or blue-green mineral pigment. Because ancient Chinese paintings often used these two colors, danqing became a synonym for painting in the Chinese language.

Throughout its history, danqing has taken on multiple meanings, and may refer to:

1. The minerals dansha (丹砂; cinnabar) and qingyu (青雘; azurite);
2. colorful mineral and metal pigments in general;
3. the colors vermillion and cyan;
4. colors or all vibrant colors in general;
5. a specific Chinese painting, and/or Chinese paintings in general;
6. the art or process of Chinese painting;
7. painter(s)/Chinese painter(s), artists who mastered the art of Chinese painting; or
8. historical records

Danqing has a longer storage time than regular plant pigments, and generally does not fade easily. It is often used as a metaphor for faithfulness, such as "danqing is unswerving (丹青不渝)."

== History ==
The word danqing has a long history in the Chinese culture and language. It appears often in Chinese classics, historical records, literature, etc. Some of the earliest historical records of danqing include the Rites of Zhou, Guanzi, the Records of the Grand Historian, the Book of Han. It also appears in many other ancient Chinese classics.

=== Zhou dynasty (1076 BC – 314 BC) ===
Danqing was mentioned in the chapter Office of Autumn on Justice of Rites of Zhou (simplified Chinese: 周礼·秋官司寇, traditional Chinese: 周禮·秋官司寇), a text written between 300 BC and 200 BC on the bureaucracy and organizational system of the Zhou dynasty. Danqing is mentioned as one of the minerals in the treasury, which was guarded by officials in the Zhi Jin (職金) position.

=== Spring and Autumn period (722 BC – 476 BC) ===
In Guanzi (管子), written by Guan Zhong (720 BC – 645 BC), danqing was referred to as the minerals that can be excavated from the mountain.

=== Warring States period (475 BC – 221 BC) ===
In the Records of the Grand Historian, written in 94 BC, a conversation between Li Si and Qin Shi Huang was recorded during the Warring States period. Li Si argued that Qin Shi Huang should not only use people and things within Qin to build the Qin dynasty, using danqing minerals from the Shu region used in Qin as an example.

=== Han dynasty (206 BC – 220 AD) ===
In the Book of Han, Sima Xiangru (179 BC – 117 BC) described a place called Yunmeng in Chu (state) to the Emperor Wu of Han, stating that the place's soil contained danqing among other colorful minerals.

By the Han dynasty, danqing had been used to refer to the style of Chinese painting. For example, in the Book of Han, Li Ling used the phrase "painted in danqing (丹青所畫)".

=== Three Kingdoms (189–263 AD) ===
During the Three Kingdoms period, Cao Pi, before becoming the first emperor of Cao Wei, wrote a letter to Meng Da, stating that "danqing draws figures, while historian records the meritorious services and achievements", in which danqing referred to the artist.

=== Jin dynasty (266–420 AD) ===
By the Jin dynasty, the word danqing was extended to mean the process of Chinese painting. In the Book of Jin, published in 648 AD, the Chinese painter and politician Gu Kaizhi was described as "especially good at danqing", in which the word meant the art of painting.

=== Tang dynasty (618–907 AD) ===
In Complete Tang Poems (全唐诗, Complete Collection of Tang Poems), Du Fu wrote a poem called Prelude of a Painting: Presented to General Cao Ba (Chinese: 丹青引贈曹將軍霸). Although the title refers to the Chinese painting, in the verse the word refers to the art of Chinese painting: "丹青不知老將至" (transl. "While I was painting, I didn't realize old age is coming").

Du Fu also wrote another poem called Passing by Guo Daigong’s Old Residence (过郭代公故宅), in which Du Fu paid ode to Guo Yuanzhen. When recalling Guo Yuanzhen's military achievements in defending and protecting the Tang dynasty, Du Fu wrote expressing his admiration for Guo by writing: "The general outstanding other famous ministers and the danqing (his painting) illuminates the central pavilion."

== Other names ==
In his book Some Technical Terms of Chinese Painting, Benjamin March transliterated the word "丹青" using the Wade–Giles romanization system as Tan Ch'ing and translated it as two definitions in English: "red and blue", and "painting, the art of painting".

== Famous danqing masters ==
In China, ancients called the painter danqingshou (丹青手), the outstanding painter danqing miaoshou (丹青妙手), while common folk called the painter the danqing shifu (丹青師傅).

- Gu Kaizhi
- Li Tang
- Qian Xuan
- Qiu Ying
- Wang Ximeng
- Wu Daozi
- Eight Eccentrics of Yangzhou
- The Four Great Academy Presidents
- List of Chinese painters

== See also ==
- Chinese painting
- Chinese pigments
- Gongbi
- Blue-green shan shui
- Bird-and-flower painting
