= Xiang Yuanbian =

Ming Chinese art collector and connoisseur

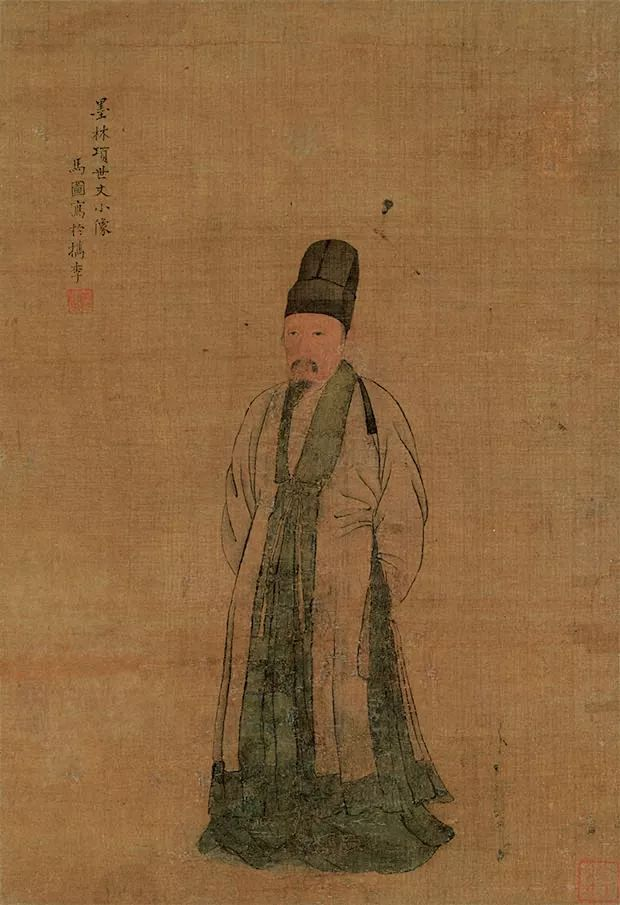
Ming dynasty portrait of Xiang Yuanbian, collection of the Shanghai Museum

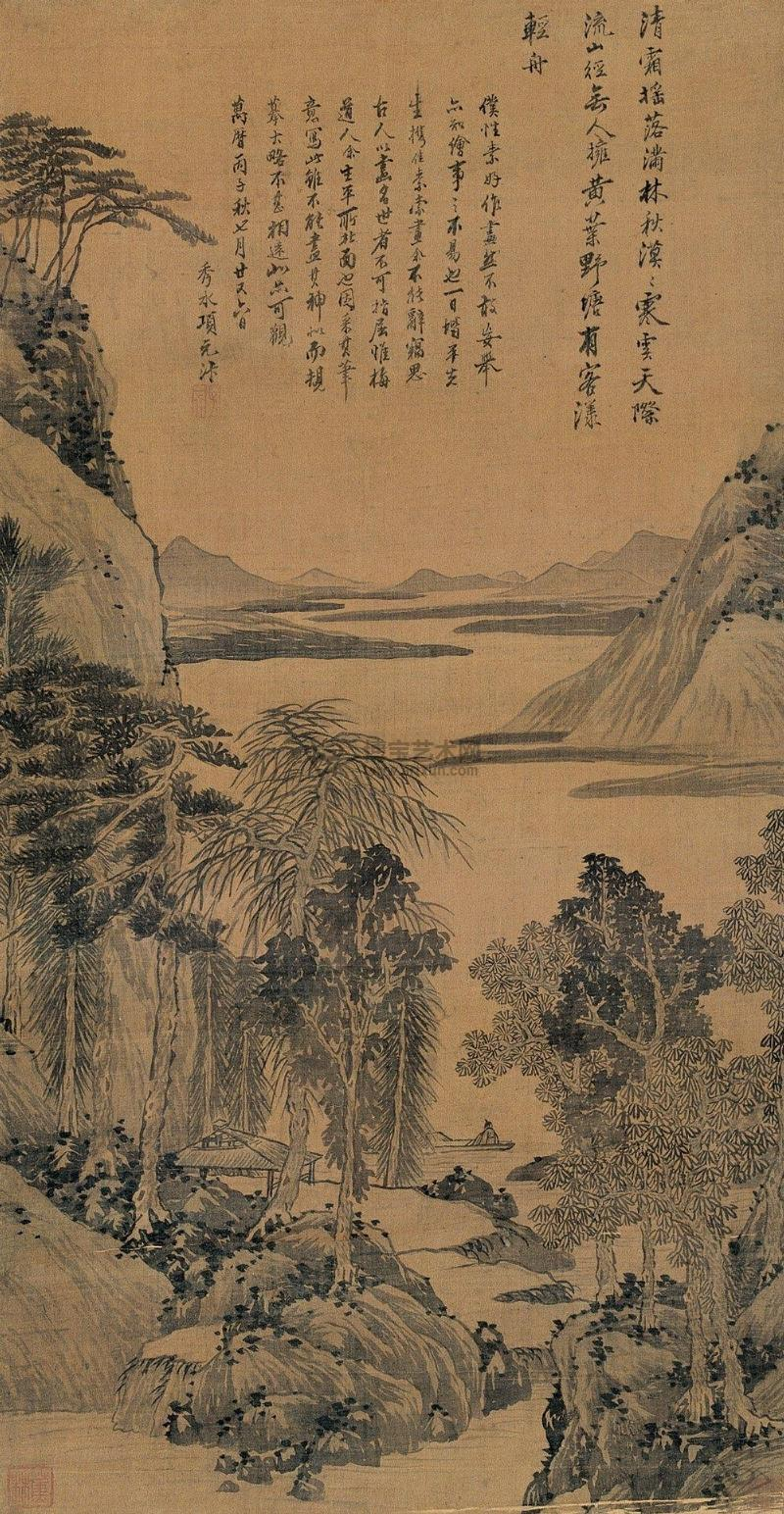
Painting by Xiang Yuanbian, Autumn Pond

Xiang Yuanbian (项元汴,1525–1590), also known by courtesy name Zijing (子京) and art name Molin (墨林), was a native of Jiaxing, Zhejiang Province. He was a prominent Ming dynasty collector and connoisseur of paintings and calligraphies.

== Life and work ==
Xiang was of short stature and plain appearance. He was born into a prosperous family of businesspeople, his family's wealth ranked among the top in the Jiangnan region. He was knowledgeable in appreciation and an avid collector of ancient bronze artifacts inscribed with text, stone steles, calligraphy works, and paintings.

His collection included works from a number of well-known calligraphers and painters from the Three Kingdoms, Jin, Tang, Song, and Yuan dynasties. He constructed the Tianlai Pavilion (天籁阁, Tianlai Ge) as a private museum for calligraphy and paintings. He frequently hosted appreciation events attended by elites, connoisseurs, literati, and artists of his time. Among his guests there were esteemed painters such as Wen Zhengming, Qiu Ying, and Dong Qichang.

He had an obsession of stamping his collection seals on authentic works and marking their prices. For example, he stamped 98 seals on the calligraphy work Lantingji Xu by Chu Suiliang, and over 70 seals on the calligraphy work Huaisu's Autobiography by Huaisu. Such a practice was criticized by Ming and Qing scholars as excessive, profit-driven, and disrespectful to the authentic art works. Although it was commended by contemporary researchers that these markings provided critical information for the collection and trading of art works at Xiang's time.

Xiang himself was proficient in calligraphy and landscape painting, learning calligraphy from Zhao Mengfu and painting from Huang Gongwang and Ni Zan. His painting "Bamboo and Chrysanthemum" was included in the Catalogue of the Stone Canal Treasure (石渠宝笈), a Qing dynasty art collection of the imperial family. His collection was nearly looted during the early years of the Qing dynasty. Today, over 650 calligraphies and 790 paintings of Xiang's collection are trackable, they are housed at the Palace Museum in Beijing, the National Palace Museum in Taipei, as well as in various museums and private collections in Hong Kong and Japan.

== Family ==
Xiang had six sons. The eldest son was Xiang Dechun, also known as Xiang Mu, the author of Shufa Yayan (书法雅言) and Yuanzhenzi Shicao (元贞子诗草). The second son was Xiang Decheng, who served at the imperial court office for calligraphy and painting. The third son was Xiang Dexin, a painter. His grandson Xiang Shengmo was a noted landscape painter.

== Work ==
- Shancai Paying Respect (善才顶礼), housed at the National Palace Museum in Taipei, Taiwan.
- Imitating Su Shi's Longevity Bamboo Painting (仿苏轼寿星竹图), housed at the National Palace Museum in Taipei, Taiwan.
- Bamboo Arrow Painting (梓竹图), housed at the National Palace Museum in Taipei, Taiwan.
- Orchid and Bamboo Painting (兰竹图), housed at the National Palace Museum in Taipei, Taiwan.
- Cypress Tree Painting (柏子图), housed at the Palace Museum in Beijing, China.
