= Liu Zhengcheng =

Chinese calligrapher (born 1946)

- Born: August 1946 (age 79); Chengdu, Sichuan
- Known for: Calligraphy
- Website: http://www.zgsf.com.cn/

Liu Zhengcheng (Simplified Chinese: 刘正成; Hanyu Pinyin: Liú Zhèngchéng) (born August 1946) is a contemporary Chinese calligrapher based in Beijing, China particularly noted for his use of the cursive script. He is president of the International Association of Calligraphers and chief editor of the "Chinese Calligraphy" journal. He was formerly deputy secretary of the Chinese Calligraphers Association. He is currently editing the 100 volume Chinese Calligraphy Encyclopedia of which 67 volumes have so far been completed. His general introduction to calligraphy published in 2008 is used as a textbook for students of the subject across China and won the Contemporary Chinese Calligraphy Contribution Award in 2007. In 2004, he was made a professor at Peking University's Institute of Calligraphy.

== Works ==
Selected works:

- "中国书法鉴赏大辞典" (The Dictionary of Chinese Calligraphy History, 1990)
- "中国书法全集" (Chinese Calligraphy Encyclopedia) - 100 volumes in total, currently published 67 volumes
- "刘正成书法集" (The Calligraphy Collection of Liu ZhengCheng, 1990)
- "刘正成书法文集" (三卷) (A Collection of Calligraphy Art Dissertations – Three Volumes, 2000)
- "书法艺木概论" (A Brief History of Calligraphy Art, 2008)
- "地狱变相图" (A Collection of Short History Novels, 1990)
- "英伦行色" (A Colourful Trip to England, 2006)
