= Chinese pigment =

Brush painting medium

Chinese pigments (Chinese: 中國國畫傳統顏料) are the traditional medium to execute traditional Chinese brush paintings, besides ink. Chinese pigments are similar to Western gouache paint in that it contains more glue than watercolours, but more so than gouache. The high glue content makes the pigment bind better to Chinese paper and silk as well as enabling works of art to survive the wet-mounting process of Chinese hanging scroll mountings without smudging or bleeding.

== Types ==
Traditionally, Chinese pigments come in form of chips, cakes or powder made from natural plant and minerals. Some of these require preparation by adding glue (明膠) before they can be used. Traditional pigments require some skill and knowledge to mix as some pigments do not blend well with others (e.g. herbal and stone colours generally do not combine well). Also, layering a different pigment on top of another can create different effects depending on the type and transparency of the upper layer pigment.

Synthetic versions that already contain glue come in tubes and are more convenient.

== Traditional colours ==
Out of the many pigments used for traditional colours, around 12 are basic colours that are widely used. Some of the pigments use natural plant ('herbal') or minerals ('stone') that are poisonous or toxic. Outside of these traditional pigments, other colours are made from synthetic chemicals.

=== Reds ===
- Cinnabar powder (硃砂粉). Basic stone colour. Requires glue.
- Vermilion cake (朱膘膏). Basic stone colour.
- Vermilion powder (銀朱粉). Essentially, a synthetic form of mercury sulfide, more brilliant than traditional vermilion made from ground cinnabar.
- Eosin red cake (曙紅膏). Basic herbal colour. It is now used in replacement of traditional carmine.
- Carmine powder (洋紅粉). Very expensive, it is now replaced with substitutes.
- Rouge (胭脂). Basic herbal colour. Usually comes in cream form.
- Scarlet cake (大紅膏). Synthetic colour.
- Dark red cake (深紅膏). Synthetic colour.

=== Blues ===
- Azurite (石青). Basic stone colour. Comes in four shades, from dark to light: 頭青, 二青, 三青, 四青. Requires glue.
- Indigo cake (花青膏). Basic herbal colour.
- Phthalocyanine blue/cyanine (酞菁藍). Basic synthetic colour.
- Azure cake (天[蘭/藍]膏). Basic synthetic colour.

=== Yellows ===
All traditional yellow pigments are toxic. Because of this, modern synthetic substitutes are often used.

- Gamboge (藤黃). Basic herbal colour. Comes in flakes or stick form.
- Chrome yellow cake (鉻黃膏). Stone colour.
- Realgar (雄黃). Stone colour. Requires glue.
- Orpiment (雌黃). Stone colour. Requires glue.
- Litharge/Lead monoxide (密陀僧). Synthetic colour. Requires glue.
- Gold powder (金粉). Requires glue.

=== Greens ===
- Malachite (石綠). Basic stone colour. Comes in four shades, from dark to light: 頭綠, 二綠, 三綠, 四綠. Requires glue.
- Jadeite powder (碧玉粉). Stone colour. Requires glue.

=== Browns ===
- Ochre/burnt sienna cake (赭石膏). Basic stone colour.
- Burnt umber (焦茶). Herbal colour. Requires glue.

=== Whites ===
In modern practice, painters tend to use white gouache paint as a substitute to traditional whites, typically for underpainting.

- Clam shell cake (蛤白膏). Made of ground white clam shells.
- Calcite powder (白方解). Stone colour. Requires glue.
- Titanium white (鈦白). Modern synthetic colour. Appears in modern sets of tube colours.
- Zinc white (鋅白). Modern synthetic colour. Sometimes called Chinese white. Appears in old sets of tube colours.
- Lead white (鉛白). Synthetic colour. Traditionally used in the past. Comes in flakes or powder form.
- Mother of pearl powder (雲母粉). Requires glue.
- Silver powder (銀粉). Requires glue.

=== Blacks ===
- Ink (墨). From ground inksticks made of pine, oil, lacquer or charcoal soot.
- Obsidian (岩黑). Requires glue.
- Black (黑). Synthetic pigment from tubes.

== See also ==
- Chinese painting
- Danqing
- Gongbi
- Blue-green shan shui
- Bird-and-flower painting
