= Zhou Chen =

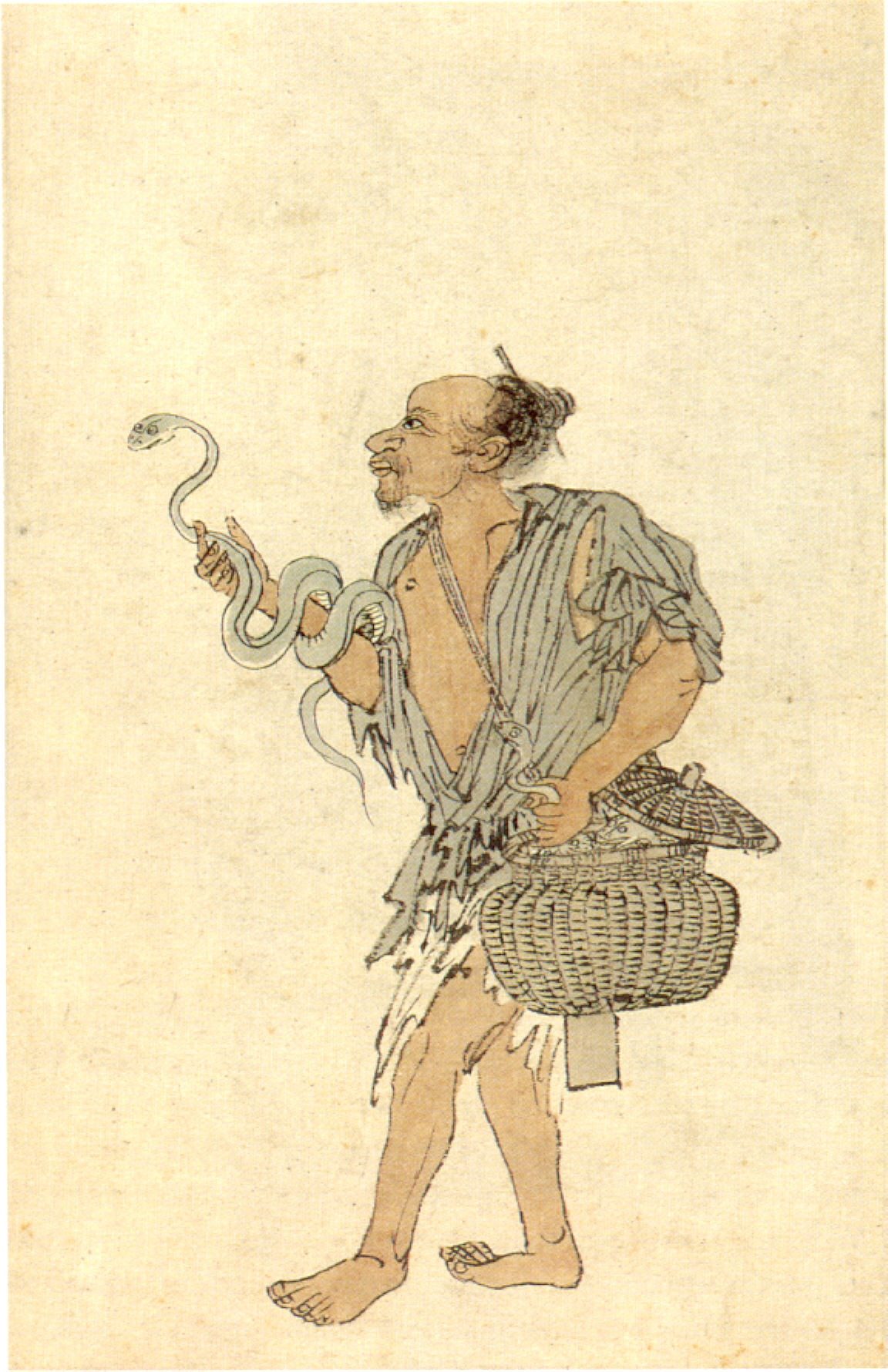
- The Unfortunates (detail), ink and color on paper by Zhou Chen, 1516, Honolulu Museum of Art
- Born: 1460; Suzhou, Jiangsu
- Died: 1535 (aged 74–75)

Zhou Chen (Chinese: 周臣; 1460–1535), also known as Chou Ch'en, was a Chinese painter active during the middle of the Ming dynasty. He was born in 1460 in Suzhou in the Jiangsu province.

Zhou's style name was 'Shunqing' and his sobriquet was 'Dongchun'. He specialized in painting landscapes and human figures. He had two very famed students, Tang Yin and Qiu Ying. He died in the Zhizong Jiajing 14th year (1535).
