= Xiang Shengmo =

Chinese painter (1597–1658)

Xiang Shengmo (simplified Chinese: 项圣谟; traditional Chinese: 項聖謨; pinyin: Xiàng Shèngmó; Wade–Giles: Hsiang Sheng-mo; 1597–1658) was a noted Chinese painter in the Ming Dynasty. He was a native of Xiushui (now Jiaxing, Zhejiang Province).

His courtesy name was Kongzhang (孔彰) and his art names were Yi'an (易庵), and Xushan Qiao (胥山樵). He was the grandson of the great painting-collector Xiang Yuanbian (項元汴). Xiang's painting followed the style of Wen Zhengming. Xiang specialized in landscapes and flowers with an elegant taste.
