= Wu Daozi =

Chinese artist (c.689–c.759)

- Traditional Chinese: 吳道子
- Simplified Chinese: 吴道子
Transcriptions
Standard Mandarin
- Hanyu Pinyin: Wú Dàozǐ
- Wade–Giles: Wu Tao-tzu

Daoxuan
- Chinese: 道玄
Transcriptions

Wu Daozi (c. 685 – c. 758 CE or c. 689 – c. 759 CE), also known as Daoxuan and Wu Tao Tzu, was a Chinese painter of the Tang dynasty. The British art historian Michael Sullivan considers him one of "the masters of the seventh century." In China, his paintings are believed to mark the peak of court painting. None of his works survive, but later surviving copies are based on his original drawings.

Wu's father died when he was at an early age, and he subsequently lived in poverty. He learned calligraphy from Zhang Xu and He Zhizhang, before specialising in painting. He pioneered realistic techniques, the formal establishment of brushwork, and landscape painting. He painted figures with round strokes so as to show their flowing clothes.

== Works ==
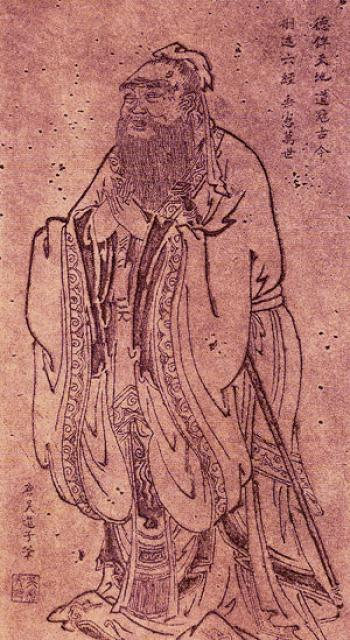
A portrait of Confucius by Wu Daozi

He traveled widely and created murals in Buddhist and Daoist temples. Wu also drew mountains, rivers, flowers, birds. No authentic originals are extant, though some exist in later copies or stone carvings. Wu's famous painting of Confucius was preserved through being copied in a stone engraving.

== Legends ==
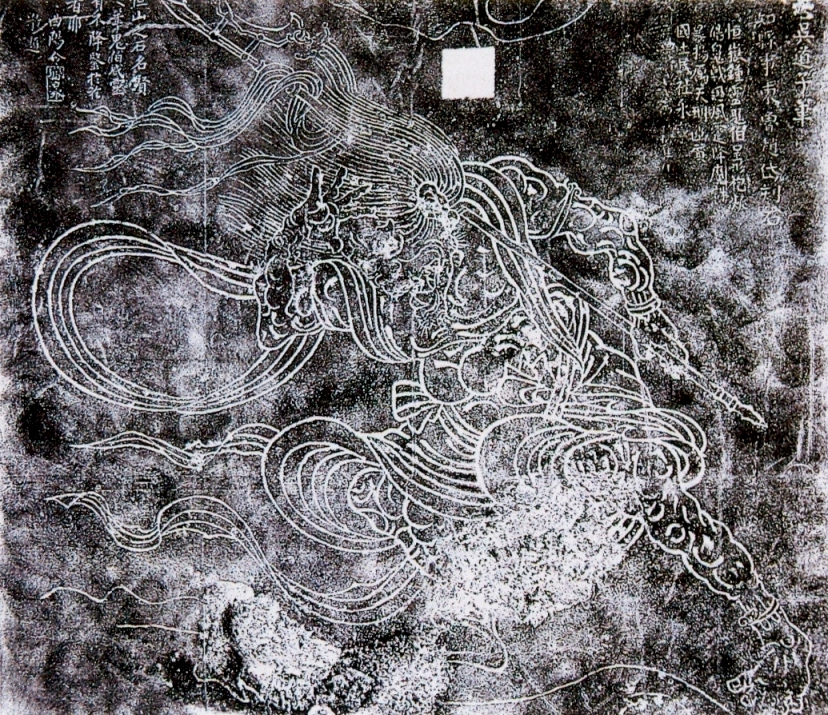
Flying demon

Numerous legends gathered around Wu Daozi, often concerning commissions by Emperor Xuanzong.

In one, Emperor Xuanzong called him to paint a wall of his palace. He painted a wall mural displaying a rich nature-scene set in a valley, containing a stunning array of flora and fauna and including a cave at the foot of a mountain. The story goes that he informed the emperor that it's not just what the emperor is able to see, Wu Daozi has made this painting in such a way, that a spirit dwells in the cave. Next, he clapped his hands and entered the cave, inviting the emperor to follow. The painter entered the cave but the entrance closed behind him and, before the astonished emperor could move or utter a word, the painting vanished from the wall. This story depicts the spirituality of art. The contemporary Swedish writer Sven Lindqvist meditates on this legend and the challenge that it poses to modern aesthetics in his book, The Myth of Wu Tao-Tzu.

Another legend states that Emperor Xuanzong sent Wu Daozi to Sichuan to study the green waters of the Jialing River in order to complete a mural of its entire course. Supposedly, Wu returned without sketches and rapidly painted the entire river from memory, completing the 300-li account within a single day. It is sometimes added that his technique was foiled by Li Sixun, who accompanied him and followed the traditional practice of working slowly from numerous prepared sketches. To the extent that it is grounded in a real event, however, it probably only reflects Wu's speed of execution and not a lack of reliance on sketches.

Another has it that a painter found one of the last surviving murals of Wu Daozi and learned to imitate the style. He then destroyed the wall, possibly by pushing it into a river, to ensure that no one else could learn the same secrets.

Eighty seven celestial people, possibly Wu Daozi.
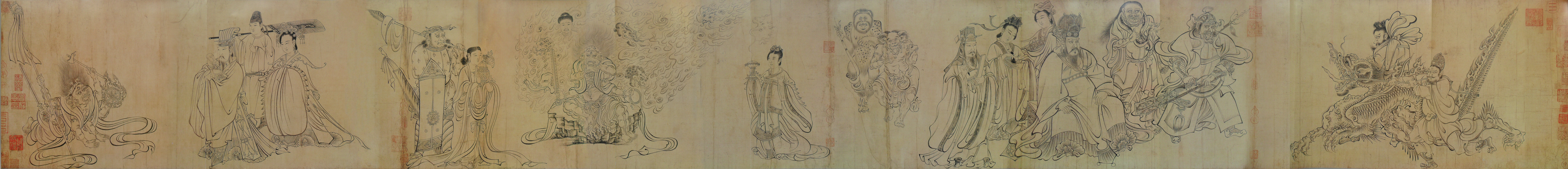
Born of Gautama Buddha, Wu Daozi.

== Legacy ==
The Presentation of Buddha was featured in 2004-5 television presentations in China.

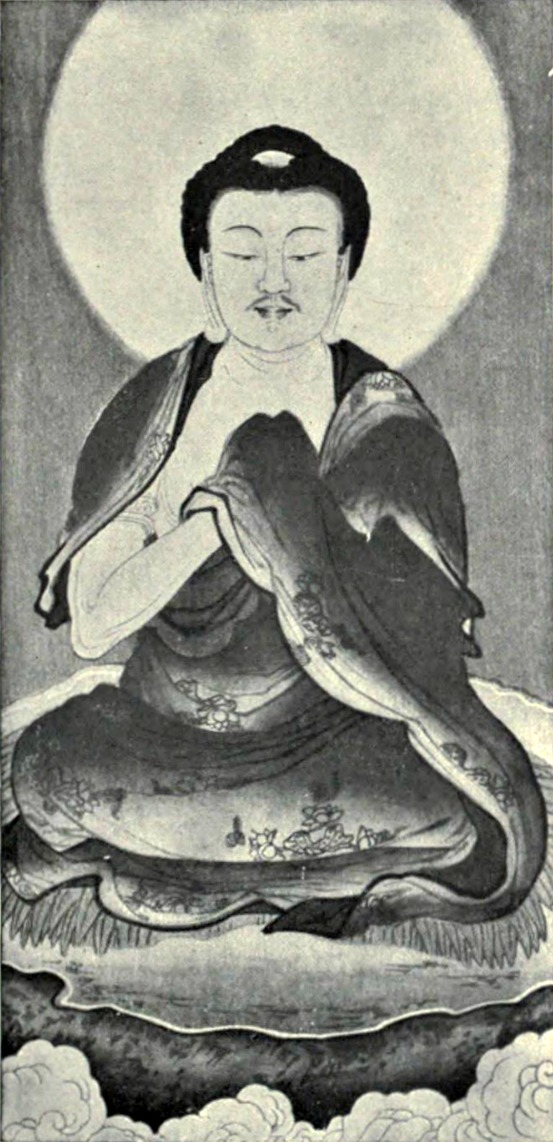
Black and white reproduction of a portrait of Sakyamuni (the Buddha), attributed to Wu Daozi, published in 12th edition of Encyclopædia Britannica (1911)

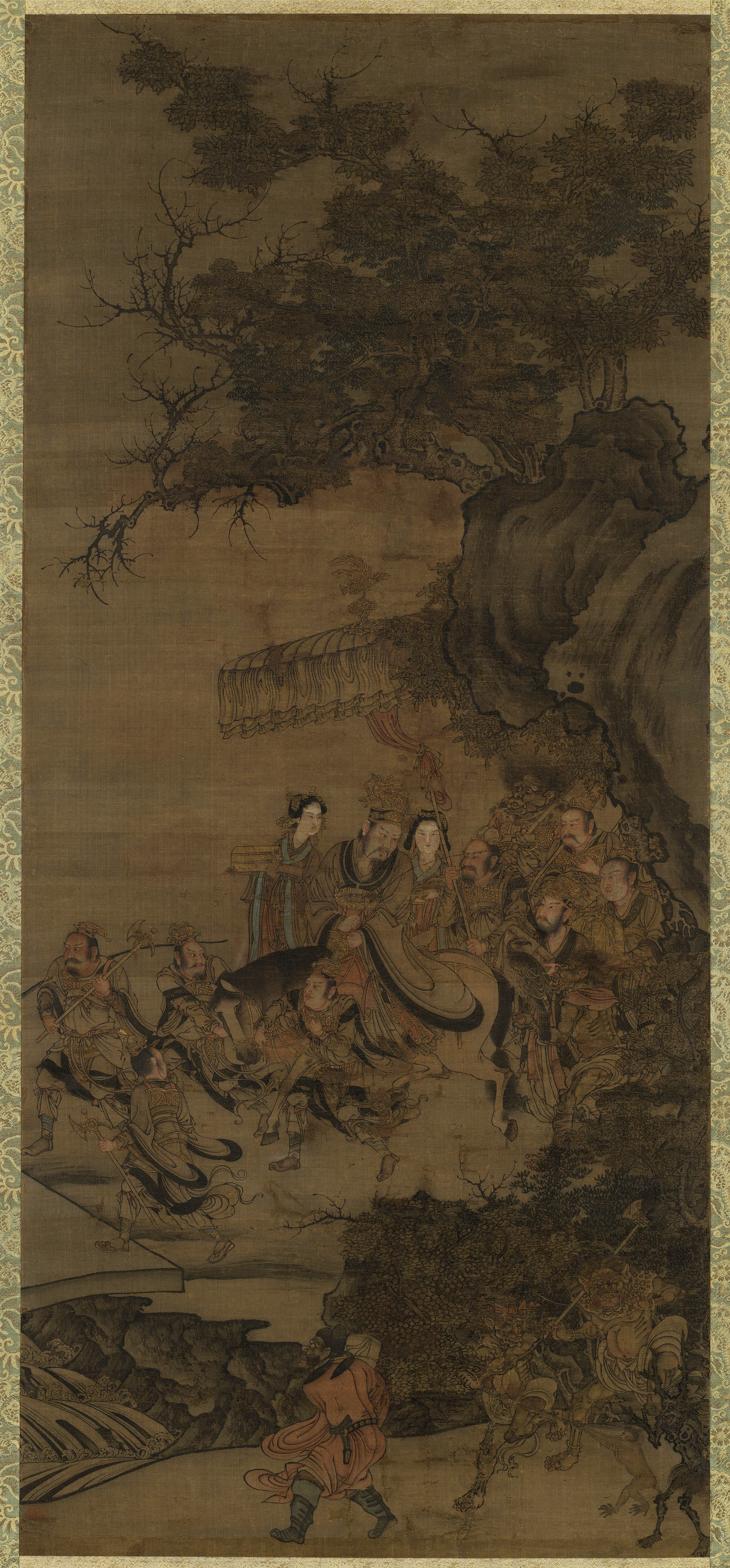
Daoist deity of Earth, attributed to Wu Daozi

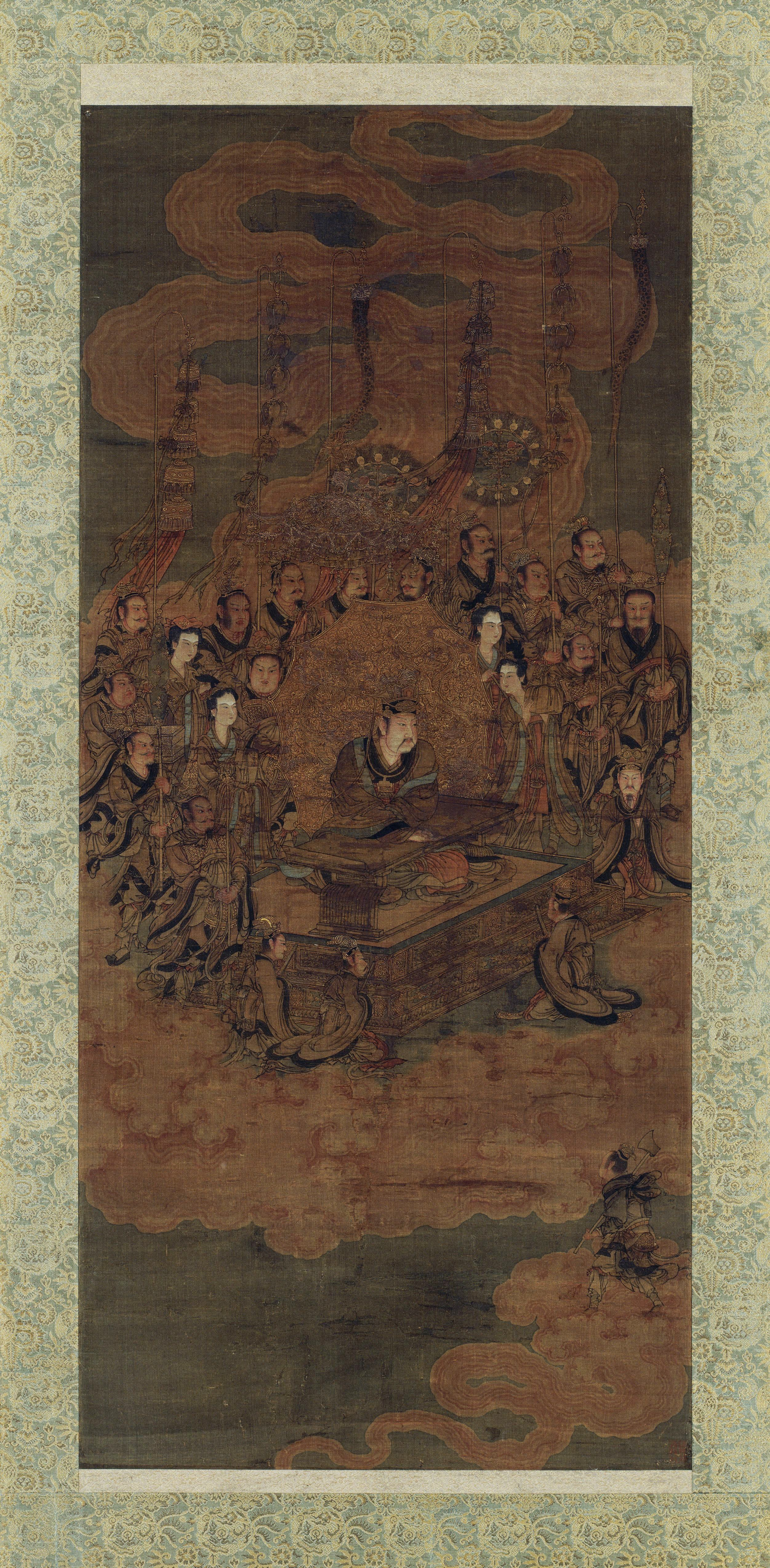
Daoist deity of Heaven

== See also ==
- Chinese mythology
- Zhou Fang, contemporary Tang dynasty painter
