= Huaisu's Autobiography =

Calligraphic work by Huaisu

Huaisu's Autobiography (Chinese: 懷素自叙帖) is a representative Chinese calligraphy work written by the renowned Tang dynasty Chinese calligrapher Huaisu on 2 Dec 777. It is often considered today to be one of the best written cursive script (草書) works in Chinese calligraphy. The work measures 28.3 cm by 755 cm and is currently kept in the National Palace Museum, Taipei. However, recent studies on this particular piece kept in the National Palace Museum revealed that it was likely a Northern Song dynasty modelling replica (映寫) of the original; there are also other replica versions of Huaisu's Autobiography.

Despite the controversy surrounding its authenticity, the work is still renowned for its dynamics and great variations in sizes among different characters while still maintaining overall aesthetics.

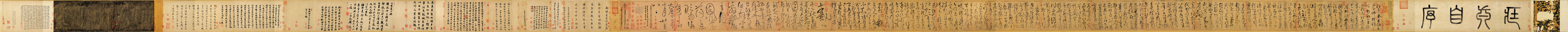
Huaisu's Autobiography, National Palace Museum, Taipei.
