= Zhou Fang (Tang dynasty) =

8th-century Chinese painter

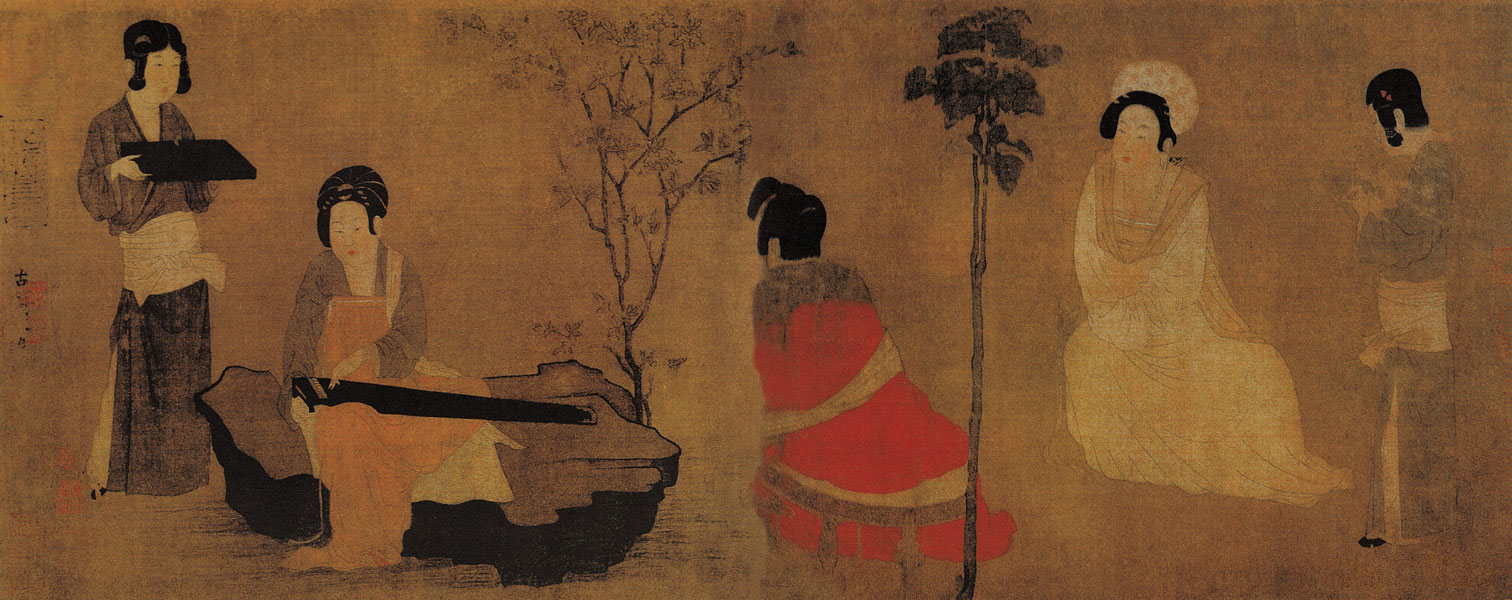
Court Lady Tuning the Lute, attributed to Zhou Fang.

Zhou Fang (Chinese: 周昉; Wade–Giles: Chou Fang; c. 730–800), courtesy name Zhonglang (仲朗), was a Chinese painter during the Tang dynasty. He lived in the Tang capital of Chang'an (modern Xi'an) and painted for the emperor. Zhou Fang came from a wealthy and prominent family, so he was very familiar with the luxurious life of the aristocratic class. He successively served as the governor of Yuezhou and Xuanzhou.

== Career and works ==
Zhou Fang was very skilled in writing, in drawing figures such as Buddha statues, and especially in depicting aristocratic women. He had a dignified appearance, a plump physique, and soft and majestic colors, which were favored by the court officials at that time. He was an important figure painter who emerged after Wu Daozi, a famous religious and figure painter, during the middle Tang dynasty. He imitated Zhang Xuan in early years, but later changed and created a unique style. The most famous Buddhist image created by Zhou Fang is "Water Moon Guanyin" which became a popular standard called "Zhou Jiaxiang". Both Zhou Fang and Zhang Xuan broke out of the circle of religious painting and developed towards genre painting.

Zhou Fang's Buddhist paintings have long been a popular standard, known as the "Zhou family style". Standing side by side with the "Cao family style", "Zhang family style", and "Wu family style", collectively known as the "Four Family Styles", the "Zhou family style" is the earliest style in ancient China with the characteristics of a painting school and is highly praised by painters throughout history.

Heirloom works of Zhou include the "Court Ladies Wearing Flowered Headdresses" scroll, the "A painting of a lady waving a fan" scroll, and the "Tuning the qin and sipping tea" scroll.

The characteristics of Zhou Fang's works, according to records at that time, were "simple and powerful clothing" and "soft and beautiful colors". The portrayal of women is characterized by their richness, which can be seen in the existing works of Zhou Fang, such as "A painting of a lady waving a fan" and "Court Ladies Wearing Flowered Headdresses". Zhou Fang's artistic career was long, three to four decades, running parallel to the Dàlì to Zhenyuan era (766–805). His artistic activity was mainly concentrated in Chang'an and Jiangnan.

== Popularity outside of China ==
Zhou Fang's fame spread abroad. In the late Zhenyuan period, envoys and merchants from the Silla Kingdom (on the present-day Korean Peninsula) in the Tang dynasty purchased dozens of works of his at high prices and transported them back to their own country. The Japanese also liked Zhou Fang's style of painting of beautiful women, showing his influence on painting in the East.

Zhou Fang's works were very popular among Koreans during the Tang dynasty. Today, Japan retains ancient paintings of beautiful women in the style of Zhou Fang. The image of women with plump faces was widely popular in China itself, especially during the middle Tang dynasty and afterwards.

== Themes ==
The themes of his artwork included religious subjects and everyday life.

Tang Hou, a scholar from the Yuan dynasty, said in his "Ancient and Modern Painting Mirror": "Zhou Fang is good at painting noble and wandering figures, and often portrays beautiful and plump ladies with a rich and noble aura."

The Song dynasty poet Huang Tingjian studied his painting "Beauty Picture" and wrote a poem: "Paintings have divine skills, and Zhou Lang can do it alone. The painting is unparalleled, the true state cannot be added." The late-Tang art critic Zhu Jingxuan said:

Zhou Fang's Buddha, celestial beings, figures, and paintings of beautiful women are all incredible masterpieces.

Zhou created paintings of goddesses modeled after imperial court ladies, a development that indicated religious painting was to become more realistic, and that secular painting was beginning to take on its initial form. His portrait paintings emphasized real life, and, as forerunners of secular lady paintings, they influenced later paintings of court ladies. More than half of Zhou Fang's works were paintings of beautiful women. They mainly focused on the enjoyment of life among the noble concubines in the upper class society at that time, such as tea making, palace riding, spring outings, playing the flute, and playing games. Zhou Fang's works depicting Tang Xuanzong and Yang Guifei indulging in leisure include "The Night Tour of Emperor Ming", "The Bathing Lady", "The Fighting Cock and Shooting Birds of Emperor Ming"

These works directly depict the emperor and his extravagant and romantic life, and were repeatedly copied by many painters, showing the social background in which the painting of beautiful women flourished at that time.

Zhou Fang's paintings of beautiful women do not depict martyrs, virtuous women, fairies, etc., but are based on the entertainment activities of aristocratic women in real life, with a strong sense of the times, thus catering to the aesthetic taste of the high-ranking officials and nobles in the middle and late Tang dynasties. His works not only promote the prosperous material life of the Tang dynasty, but also reveal the extremely impoverished spiritual world of the noblewomen. The concubines in this picture have a plump figure and gorgeous clothing, but a gloomy face, display lazy behavior, and no vitality.

From the content of Zhou Fang's works, it can be seen that he served the cultural life of the upper-class aristocracy in the Tang dynasty, portraying the luxurious and indulgent lifestyle of the ruling class. Ladies depicted by him have a graceful appearance and a plump figure, with "clear and fresh eyes, eyebrows without continuous curls, red lips and white teeth, and a trimmed and hanging nose."

== Followers ==
Zhou Fang's disciples include Cheng Xiuji, Wang Zhi, Zhao Boxuan, Zhao Bowen, and others. Among them, Cheng Xiu had been following Zhou Fang for twenty years and had the deepest relationship with him.

== Gallery ==
Court Ladies Playing Double-sixes attributed to Zhou Fang.

This ink-and-color-on-silk painting, titled Court Ladies Playing Double-sixes, measures 30.5 cm × 69.1 cm (12.0 in × 27.2 in) and depicts members of the emperor's household playing the board game liubo. It now hangs in the Freer Gallery of Art in Washington, D.C. It reflects the lifestyle of the aristocracy at that time.

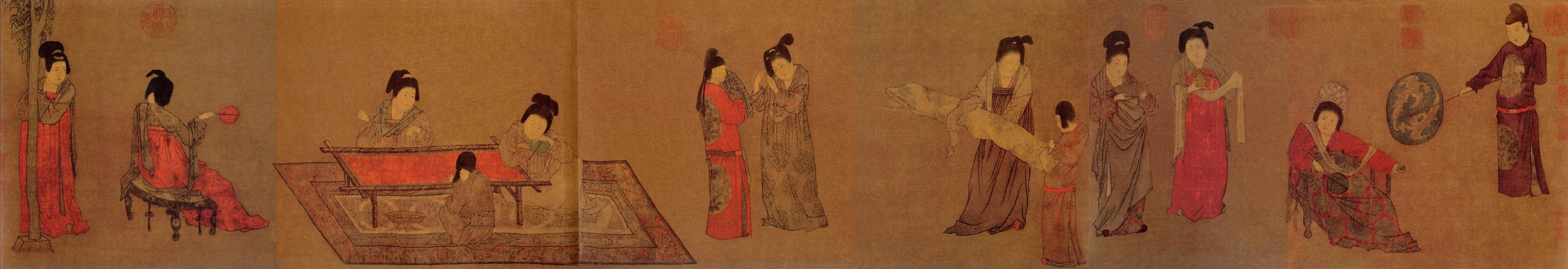
Lady With Servants attributed to Zhou Fang.

This picture depicts 13 concubines and palace maids with high buns on their heads, round eyes, and long skirts dragging the ground. The entire painting presents various activities of the characters in a horizontal arrangement, such as sitting lazily with a fan, unpacking and playing the piano, dressing up in front of a mirror, embroidering and working on a desk, and relaxing with a fan. Rhythmic changes of horizontal density and looseness, as well as the hierarchical changes of vertical height, make the structure of the picture orderly and avoid monotony and rigidity in composition. The picture is rich in color, with red as the main color and various colors such as blue, gray, purple, and green. The warm and cold tones complement each other, revealing the delicate skin of the characters and the luxurious clothing materials. The clothing lines are drawn with iron lines, round and graceful, full of strength and flexibility, accurately depicting the various postures of the characters. Currently housed in the Palace Museum.

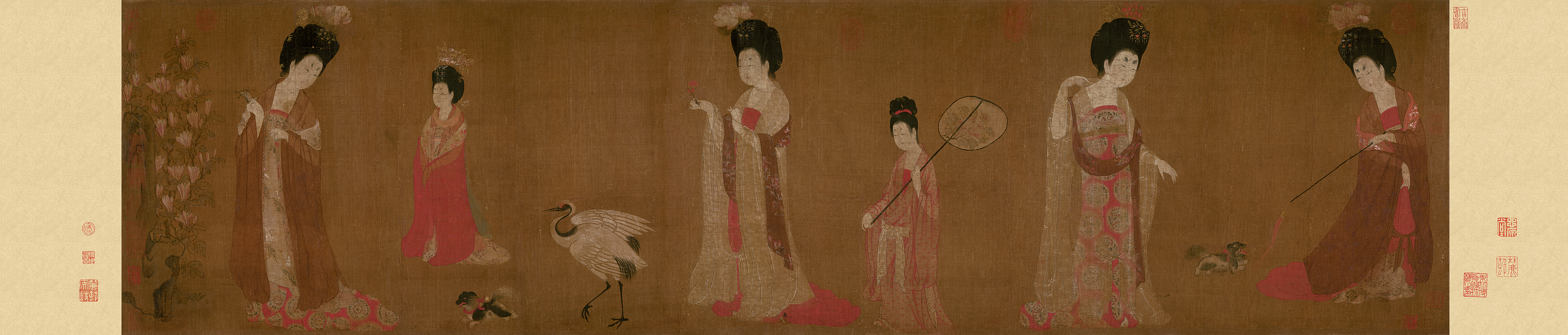
Court Ladies Wearing Flowered Headdresses attributed to Zhou Fang.

"The Picture Scroll of Lady with Hairpin Flowers" draws inspiration from the life of palace women, with gorgeous and luxurious concubines leisurely strolling in the garden. The characters have a plump physique, calm and leisurely movements, and peaceful expressions. The identities and lifestyle characteristics of the concubines are well expressed. Currently housed in the Liaoning Provincial Museum.

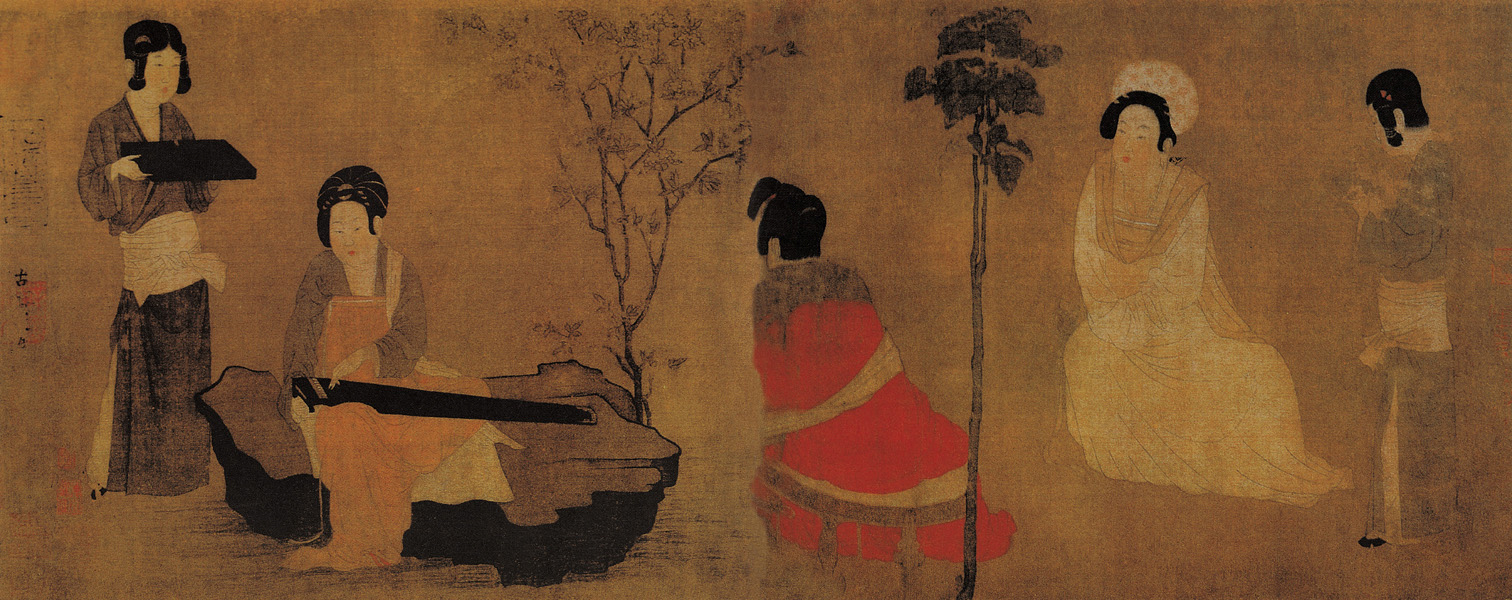
Tang Zhou fang Tipping Qin and Drinking Tea Picture

This picture, also known as "The Painting of a Lady Playing the Qin", depicts three noblewomen sitting in the courtyard playing the qin, sipping tea, and listening to music under the care of two maids, depicting the leisurely and peaceful life of aristocratic women. There are osmanthus trees and wutong in the picture, implying that autumn has arrived. The noblewomen seem to have a premonition that they will face withering after the flowering season. The veil on the shoulders of the women tuning the piano and sipping tea has slipped down, revealing their lazy, lonely, drowsy and decadent state. The character lines in the painting are mainly drawn with Hairspring drawing, and some iron wire drawings are infused, adding a touch of rigidity and squareness to the smooth flowing hairline drawings. The color scheme tends to be uniform and light, and the clothing is completely devoid of decoration, giving a sense of simplicity. Currently housed at the Nelson Atkins Museum of Art in Kansas, Missouri, USA.

== See also ==
- Wang Wei, another notable painter of the early to mid-Tang dynasty
