= Huaisu =

Buddhist monk and calligrapher (737–799)

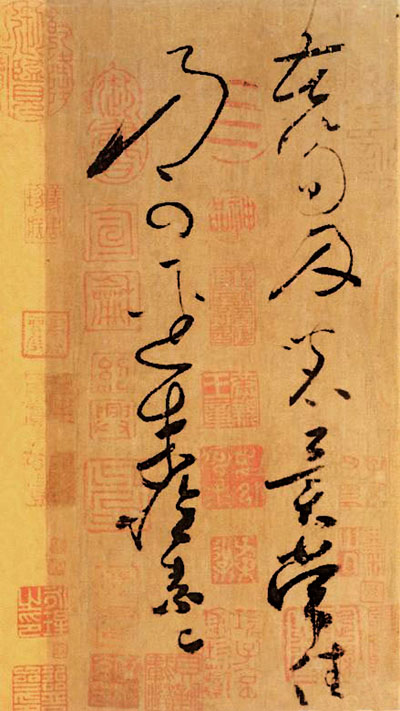
One of Huai Su's surviving works

Huaisu (simplified Chinese: 怀素; traditional Chinese: 懷素; pinyin: Huáisù, 737–799), courtesy name Zangzhen (藏真), was a Buddhist monk and calligrapher of the Tang dynasty, famous for his cursive calligraphy. Fewer than 10 pieces of his works have survived. One of his representative works is the Huaisu's Autobiography.

He was born in Lingling, Yongzhou, Hunan. Not much is known of his early life. His secular surname may have been Qian (錢). It is possible that Huaisu was a nephew of the poet Qian Qi (錢起). He became a monk in his childhood, apparently out of poverty.

Legend has it that he planted banana trees (or any genus of trees under Musaceae) in the courtyard of the temple where he lived and used the leaves as paper to practice his art. He gained his national fame in his early thirties when he came to Chang'an, which was then the capital of China. Famous poets of his time spoke highly of his works, including Li Bai. Like Li Bai, he was fond of alcohol.

Traditionally Huaisu is paired with the older Zhang Xu as the two greatest cursive calligraphers of the Tang dynasty. The duo is affectionately referred to as "the crazy Zhang and the drunk Su" (diān Zhāng zuì Sù 顛張醉素).
