= Qiu Ying =

Chinese painter (1494–1552)

Qiu Ying 仇英
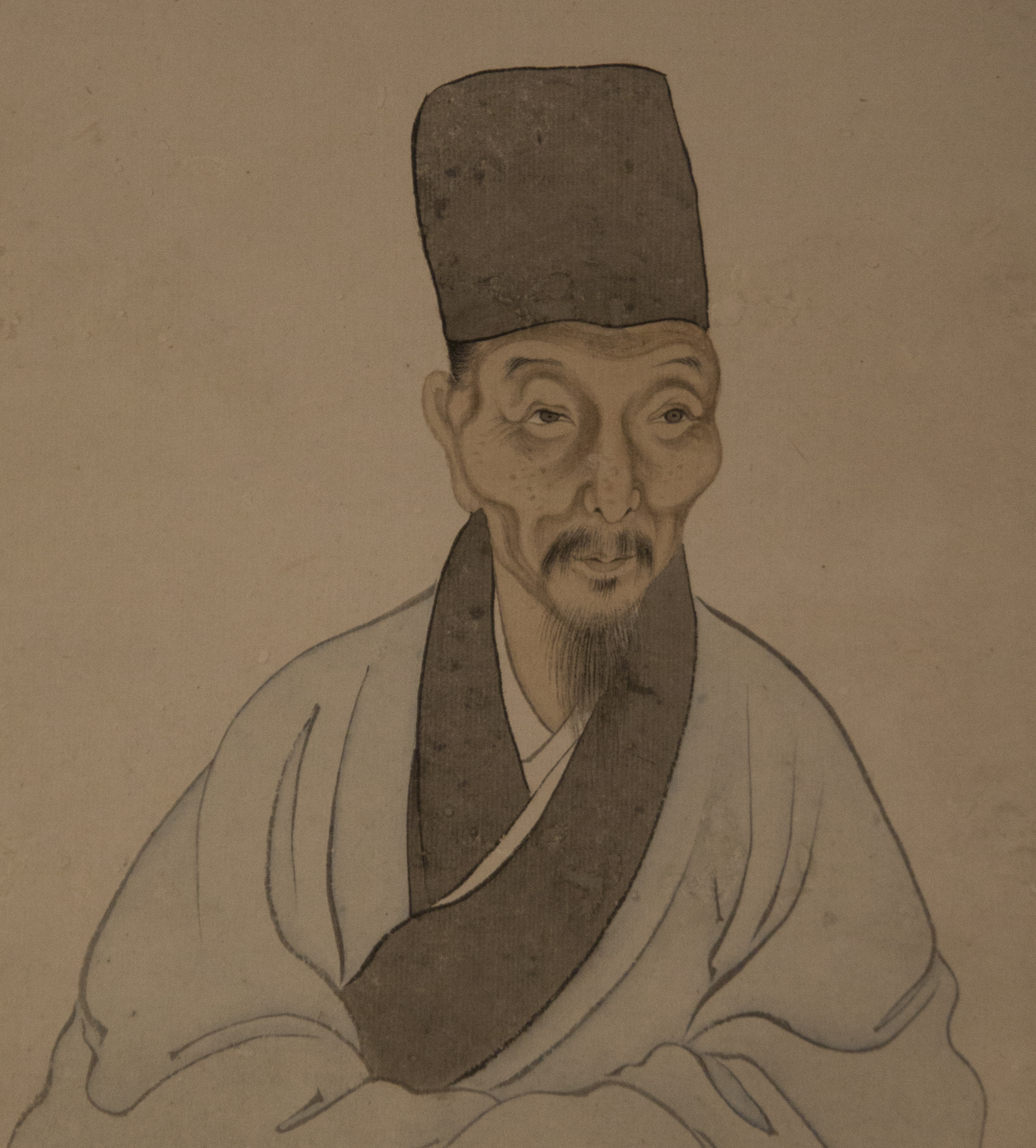
- Born: 1494; Taicang, Jiangsu
- Died: 1552 (aged 57–58); Taicang, Jiangsu
- Known for: Gongbi
- Movement: Zhou Chen, Wu School, Four Masters of the Ming dynasty
- Patrons: Chen Guan, Zhou Fenglai (1523–1555), Xiang Yuanbian

Qiu Ying (Chinese: 仇英; pinyin: Qiú Yīng; Wade–Giles: Ch'iu Ying; 1494–1552) was a Chinese painter of the Ming dynasty who specialised in the gongbi brush technique.

== Early life ==
Qiu Ying's courtesy name was Shifu (实父), and his art name was Shizhou (十洲). He was born to a peasant family in Taicang. His family moved to Suzhou (蘇州), where Qiu Ying apprenticed as a lacquer artisan, painting decorations on lacquer-ware. Despite his family's humble origins, he had natural talent and skill in painting. He later learned the art of painting from Zhou Chen (周臣, ca. 1450–1535).

== Career ==
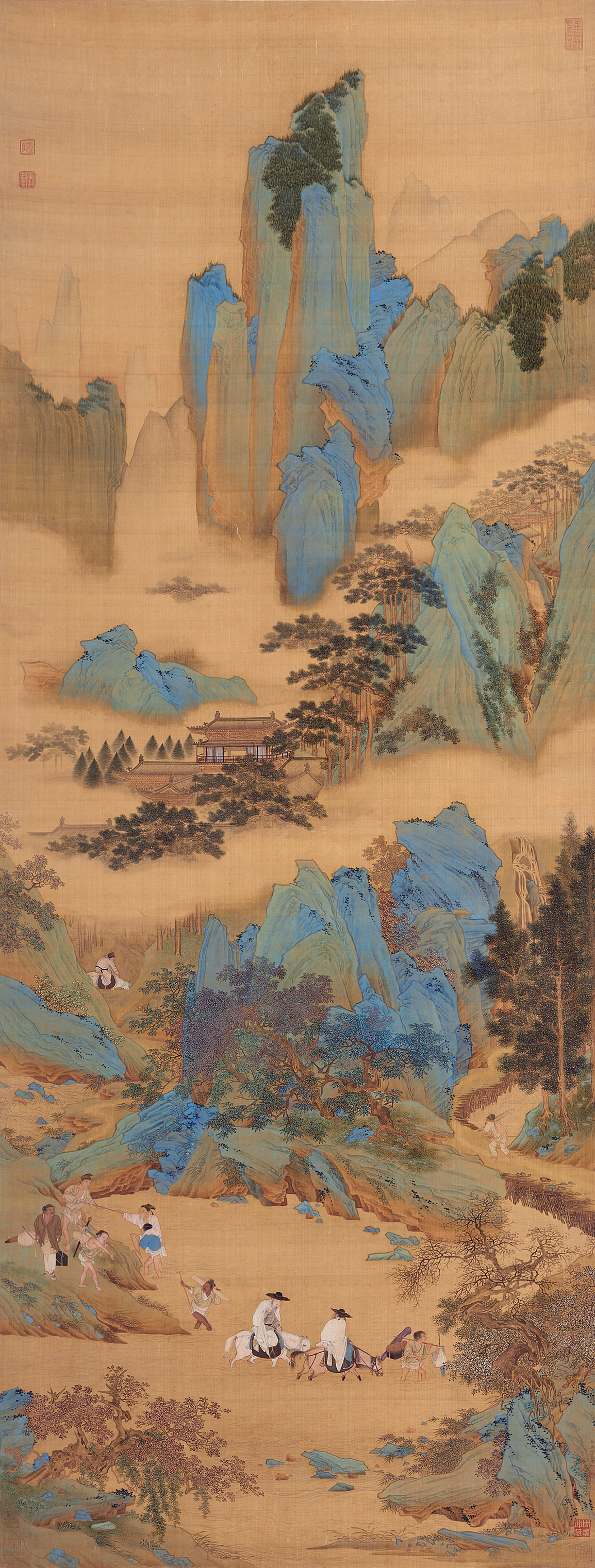
The Emperor Guangwu Fording a River

He painted with the support a few of wealthy patrons, working in the residences of Chen Guan (d. after 1557) in Suzhou, Zhou Fenglai (1523–1555) in Kunshan, and Xiang Yuanbian (1525–1590) in Jiaxing in Zhejiang Province. With his special gift for copying paintings, Qiu Ying found favour among collectors, bringing him an opportunity to copy and learn from Song and Yuan dynasty paintings in the collections of the Jiangnan area and greatly broadening his artistic scope. As Qiu Ying's skills in painting matured, a style of his own gradually emerged and took form.

Though Suzhou's Wu School encouraged painting in ink washes, Qiu Ying also painted in the blue-and-green style and incorporated different techniques into his paintings. His paintings on figure, landscape, and flower subjects all therefore have a quality of originality. His talent and versatility allowed him to become regarded as one of the Four Masters of the Ming dynasty.

During the Ming dynasty, erotic literature became increasingly popular in Southern China. Erotic novels were accompanied by pictures known as "intimate play pictures" (秘戲圖) or "spring paintings" (春書). Qiu Ying was known for these erotic depictions, alongside Zhao Mengfu and Tang Yin.

Qiu Ying best known original works are Harp player in a pavilion (located at the Museum of Fine Arts in Boston) and The Emperor Guangwu Fording a River (National Gallery of Canada), and Dwellings of the Immortals - Jade Cave Fairy (The Palace Museum in the Forbidden City in Beijing, China).

His daughter, Qiu Zhu (仇珠, fl. 16th c.), and son-in-law, You Qiu (尤求, fl. 16th c.), followed him in painting. You Qiu served as a muralist for Wang Shizhen (1526–1590), a Ming dynasty poet.

== Collections ==
Work attributed to Qiu Ying is held in the permanent collections of several museums worldwide, including the Princeton University Art Museum, the Indianapolis Museum of Art, the University of Michigan Museum of Art, the Penn Museum, the Museum of Fine Arts, Boston, the Nelson-Atkins Museum of Art, and the British Museum.

== Gallery ==
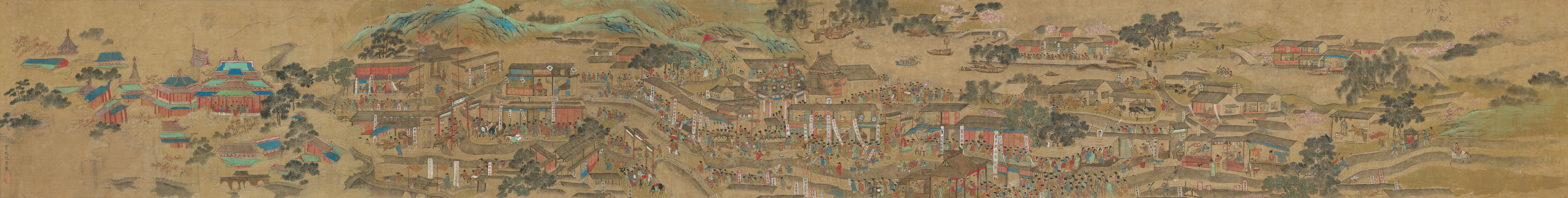
The Bustling and Hustling of Nanjing
Peach Village

Fisherman Hermit

Jade Cave Fairy Land

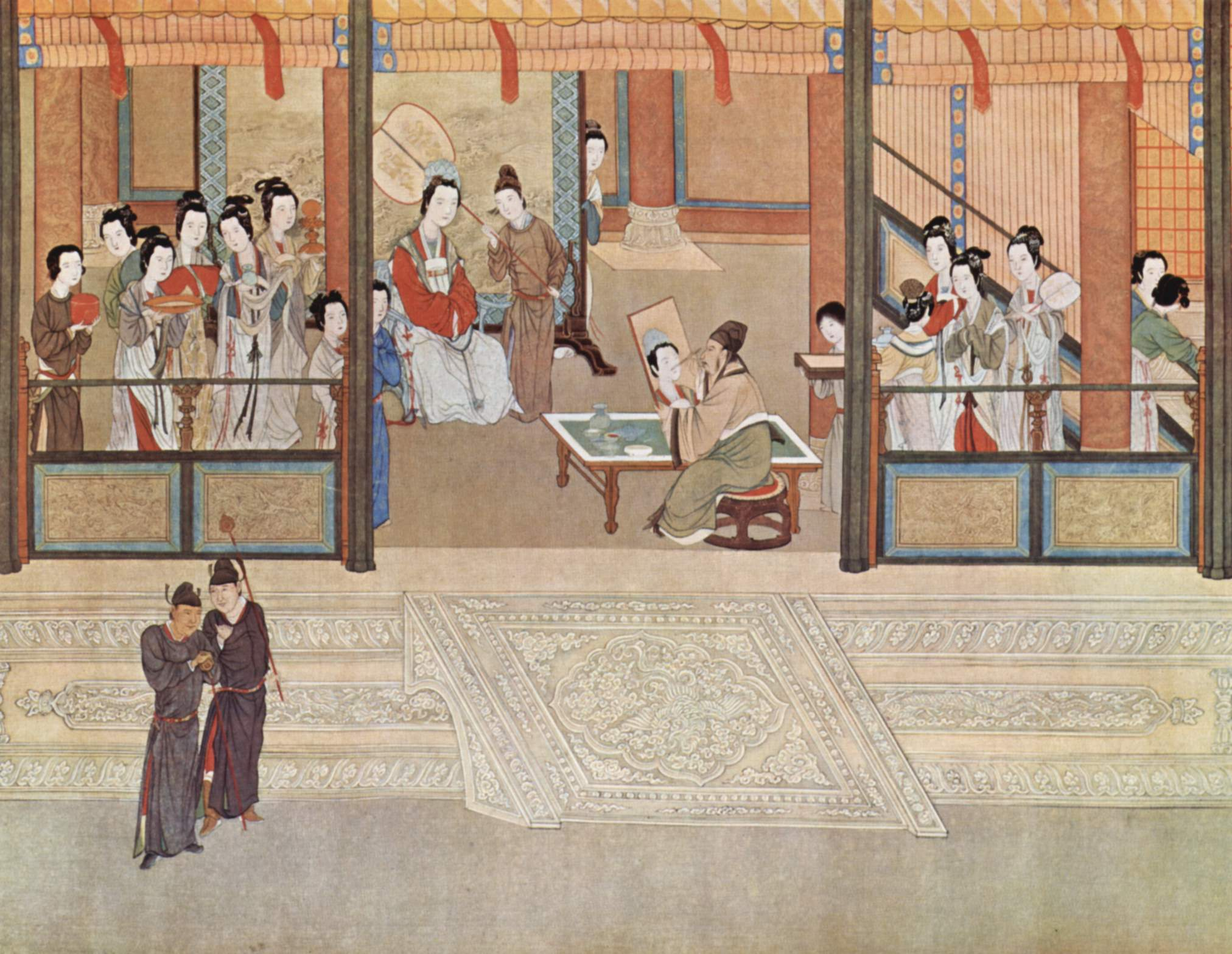
Spring morning in the Han Palace

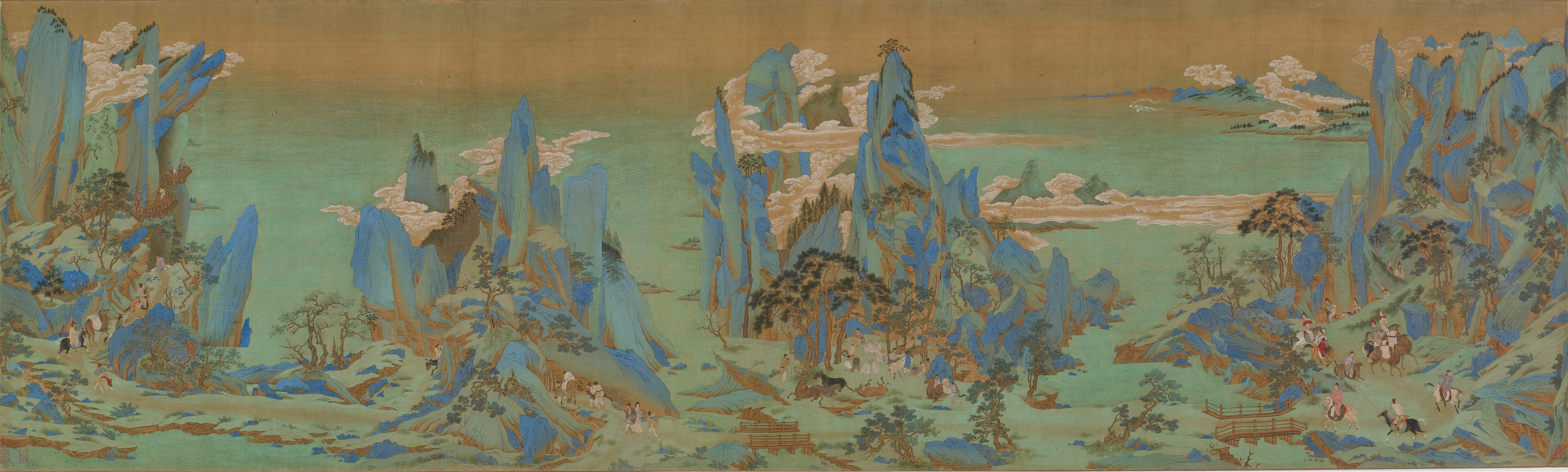
Emperor Minghuang's Journey to Sichuan

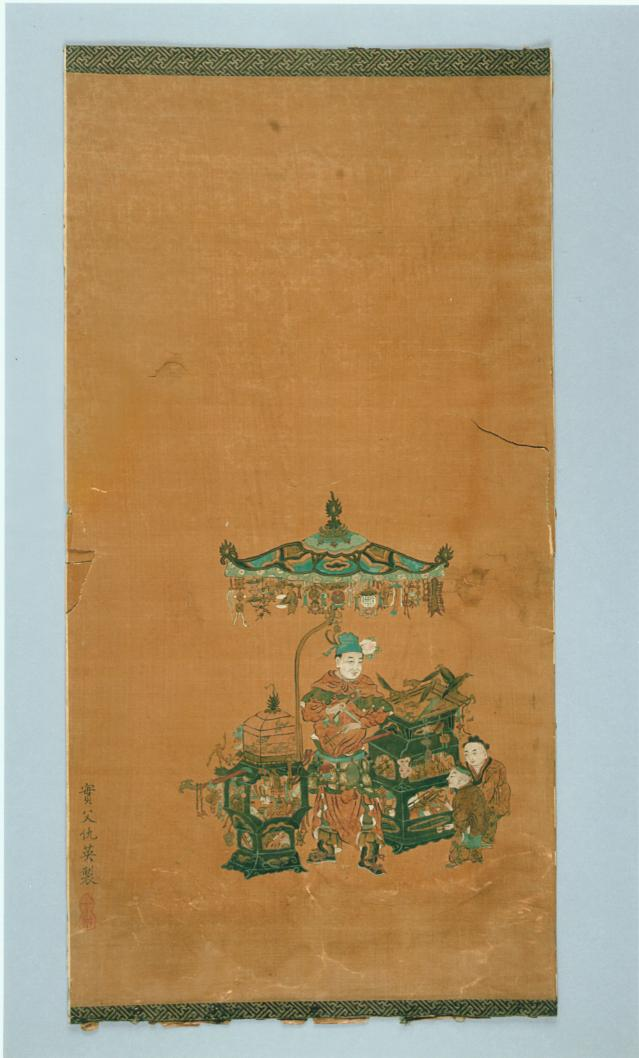
Scroll illustrating The Heart Sutra, 1543

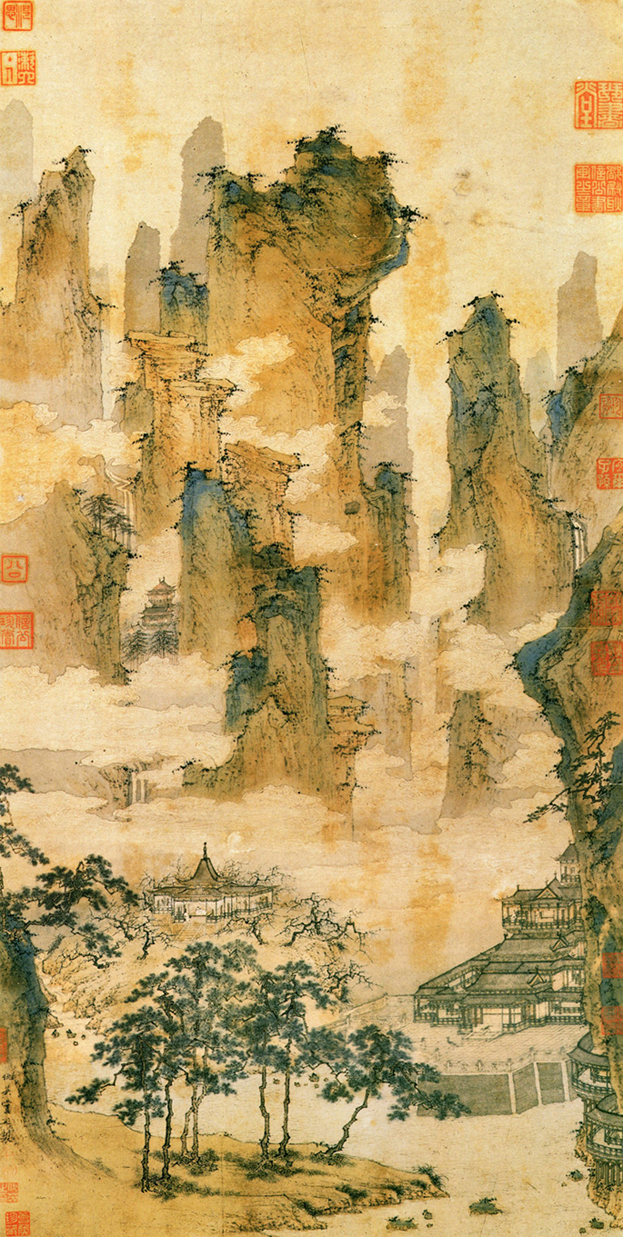
Pavilions in the Mountains of the Immortals

The Imperial examinations, 1540

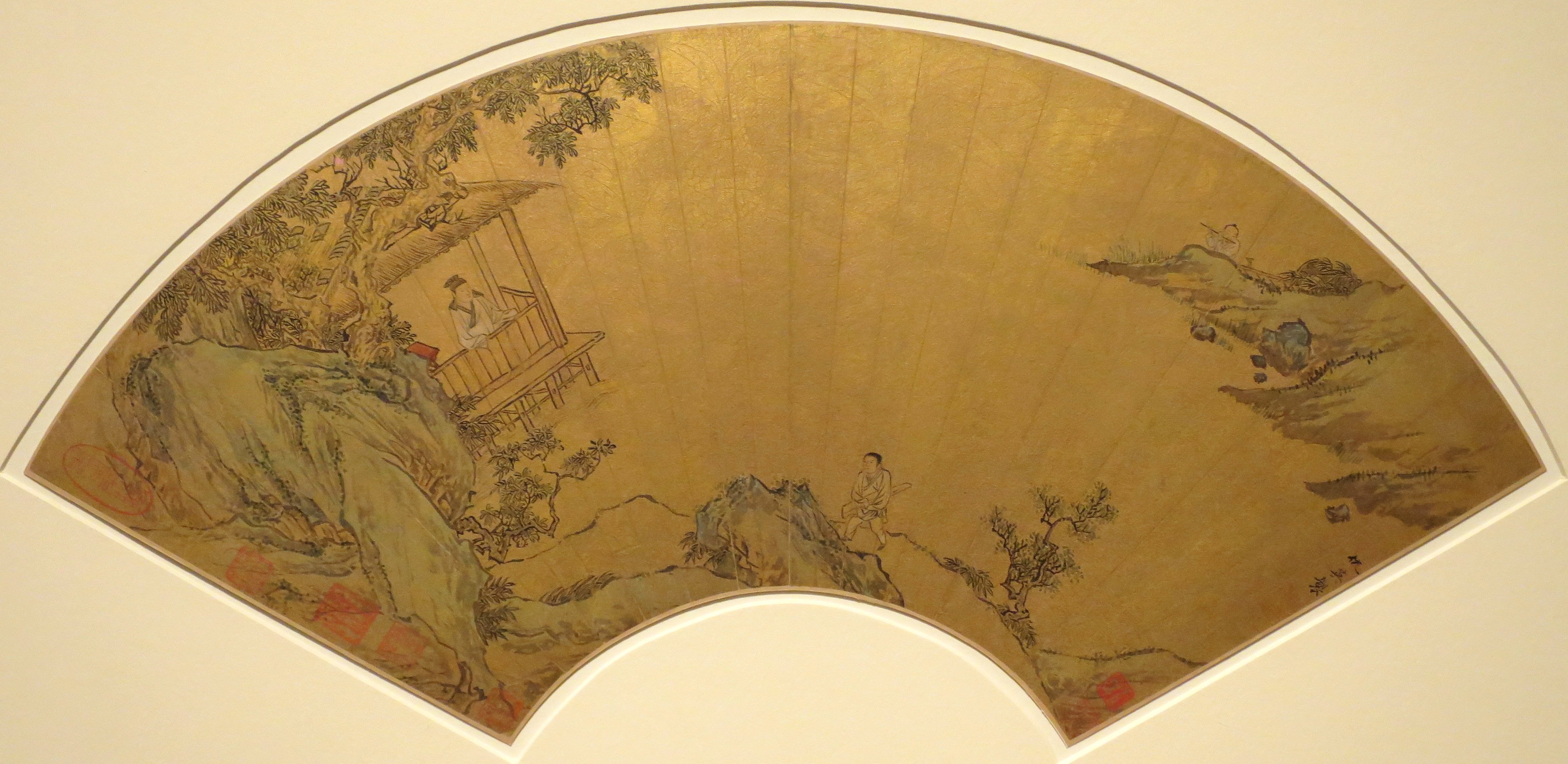
Landscape with Scholar in Pavilion

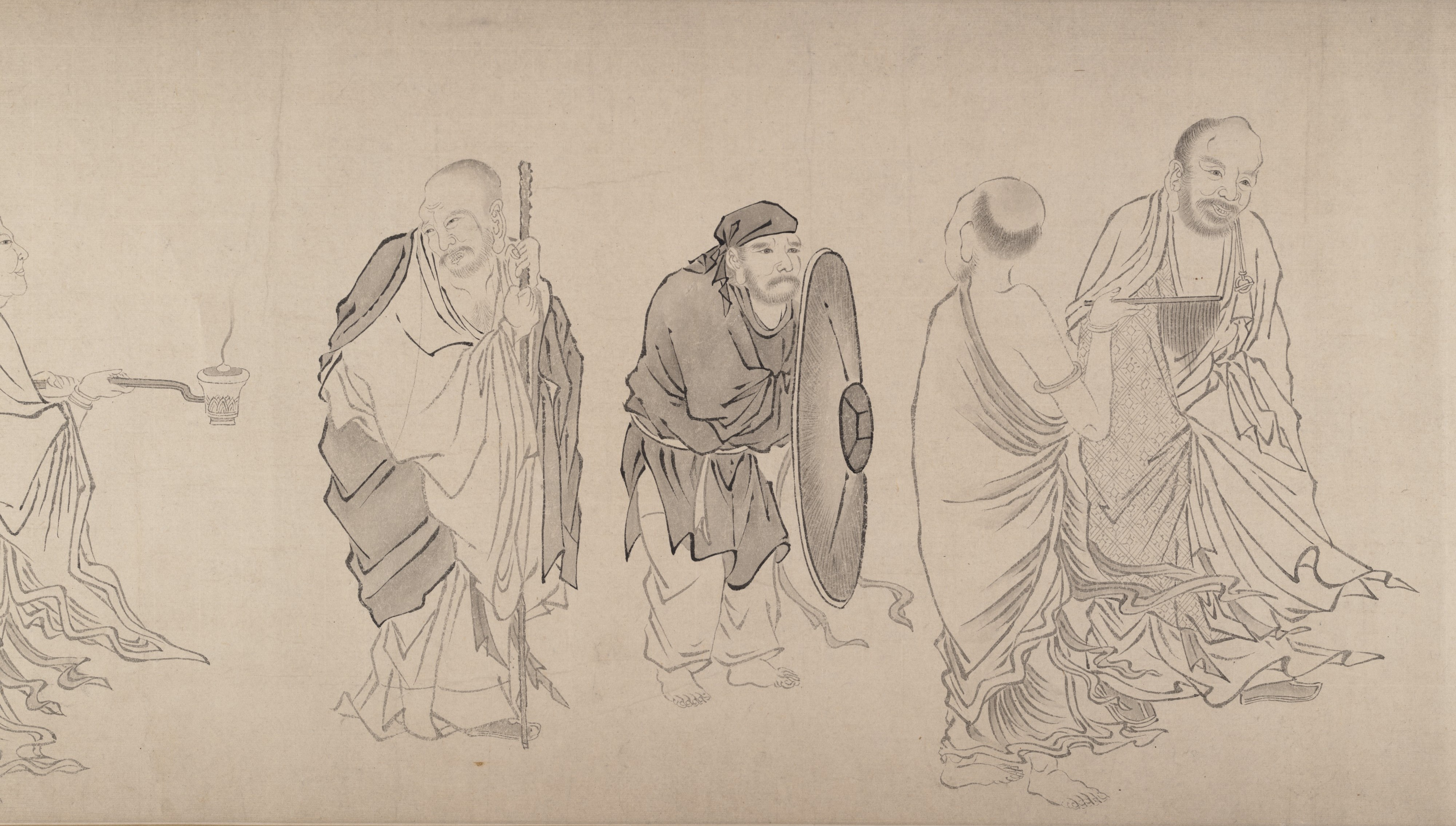
The Sixteen Luohans

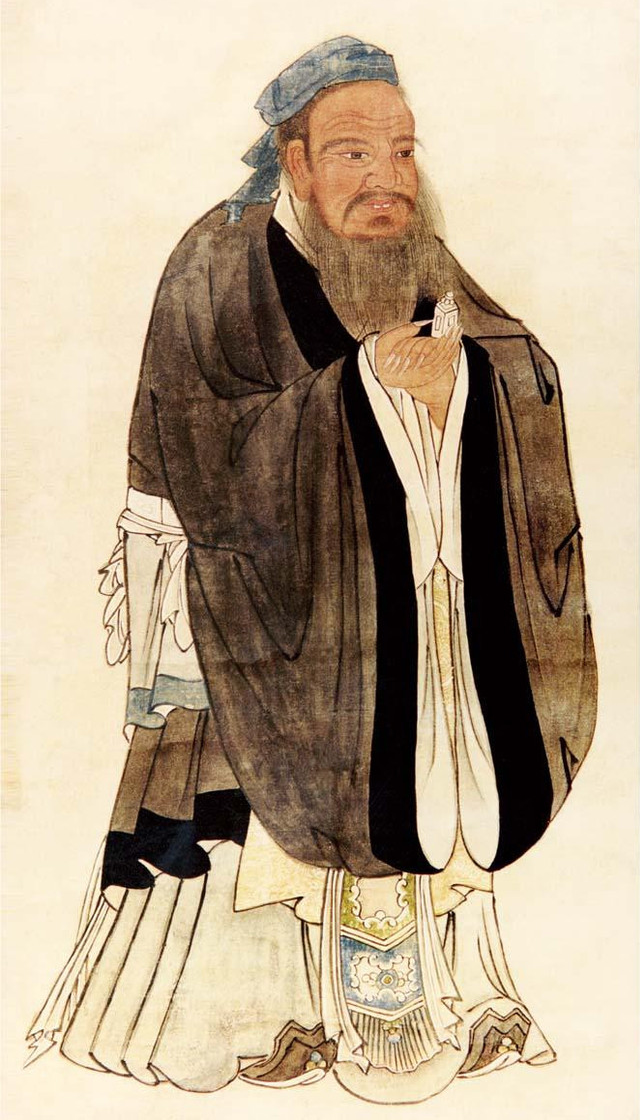
Portrait of Confucius
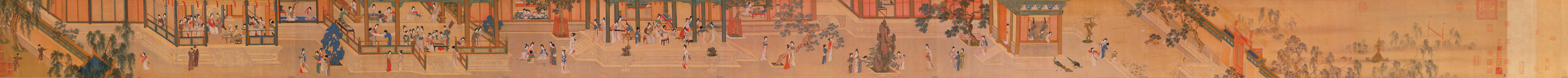
Han Palace Spring Daybreak
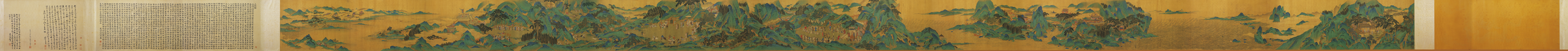
Shanglin Park
Scroll of tribute
Wo Kou tu juan
