= Li Sixun =

Chinese painter (651–716)

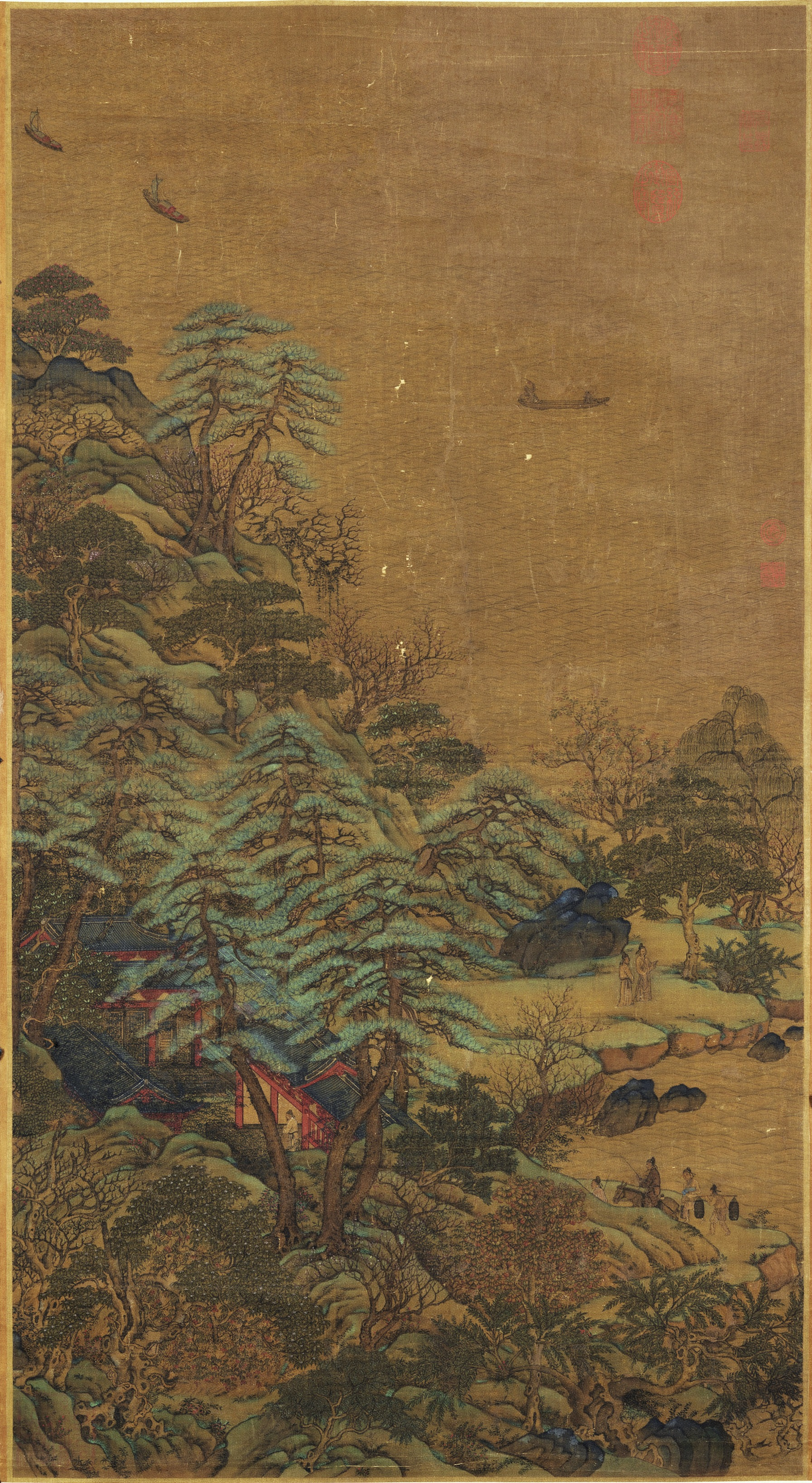
"Sailing Boats and a Riverside Mansion", attributed to Li Sixun

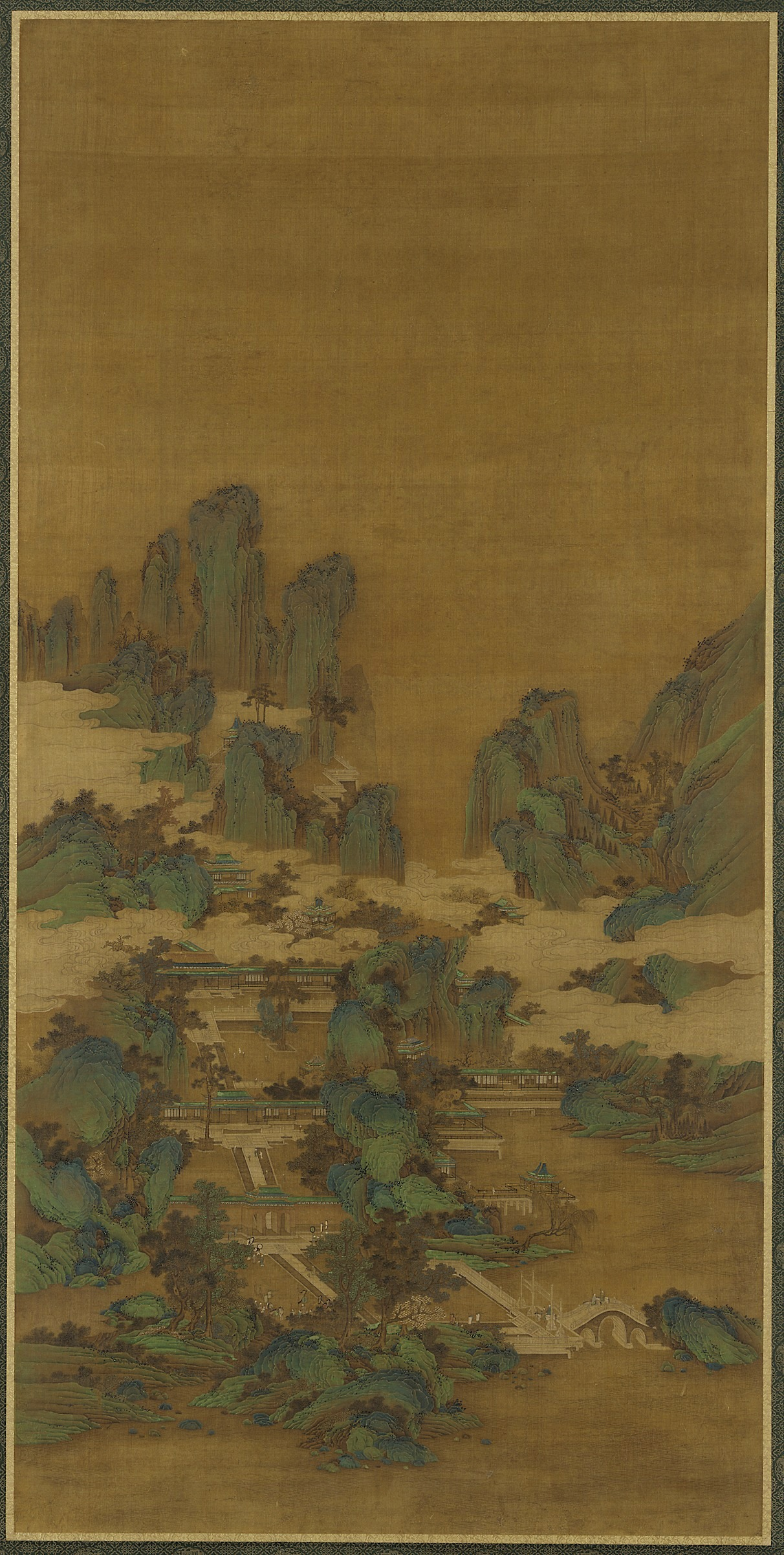
"Emperor Taizong Arriving at the Jiucheng Palace". Formerly attributed to Li Sixun, this is now thought to be a Ming dynasty copy from around 1500.

Li Sixun (651–716 Chinese: 李思训; Wade–Giles: Li Ssu-hsün) was a Chinese noble and painter of landscapes who lived during the Tang dynasty. According to Encyclopædia Britannica, he is considered by Dong Qichang to be the founder of the Northern school of landscape painting.

As a member of the royal family, he had the honorary title of general. His son Li Zhaodao was also a painter and so the father is distinguished as General Li Senior or the Elder.

He used brightly coloured mineral pigments, especially azurite blue and malachite green. His technique was meticulous and detailed, so that large works such as murals might take months to complete. He is also said to be the one who initially formulated qinglü shanshui.
