= Cursive script (East Asia) =

Script style of Asian orthography

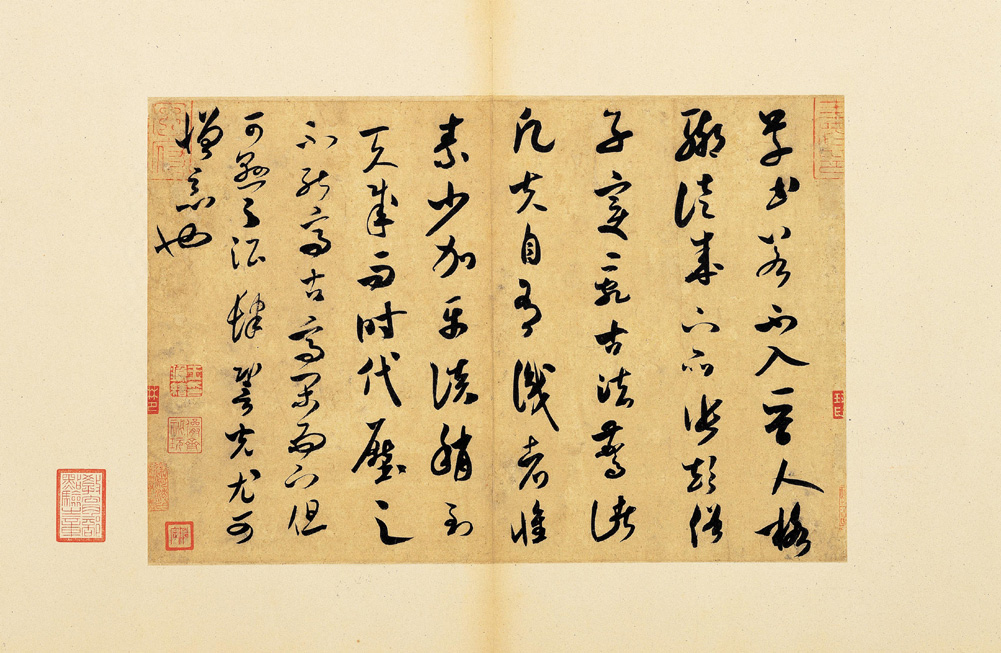
- Mi Fu's On Calligraphy, a written discourse about the cursive style

Chinese name
- Traditional Chinese: 草書
- Simplified Chinese: 草书
- Literal meaning: draft script
Transcriptions
Standard Mandarin
- Hanyu Pinyin: cǎoshū
- Bopomofo: ㄘㄠˇ ㄕㄨ
- Wade–Giles: ts'ao^{3} shu^{1}
- IPA: [tsʰàʊ.ʂú]
Wu
- Romanization: ^{5}tshau-sy_{1}
Hakka
- Pha̍k-fa-sṳ: chhó-sû
Yue: Cantonese
- Jyutping: cou2 syu1
Southern Min
- Hokkien POJ: chhó-chir/chhó-su

Vietnamese name
- Vietnamese: thảo thư, chữ thảo
- Hán-Nôm: 草書, 𡨸草

Korean name
- Hangul: 초서
- Hanja: 草書
Transcriptions
- Revised Romanization: choseo

Japanese name
- Kanji: 草書体
- Kana: そうしょたい
Transcriptions
- Romanization: sōshotai

Cursive script

Related scripts
- Parent systems: Oracle bone script: Seal script; Clerical script; Cursive script

Cursive script (simplified Chinese: 草书; traditional Chinese: 草書; pinyin: cǎoshū; Japanese: 草書体, sōshotai; Korean: 초서, choseo; Vietnamese: thảo thư), often referred to as grass script, is a script style used in Chinese and East Asian calligraphy. It is an umbrella term for the cursive variants of the clerical script and the regular script.

The cursive script functions primarily as a kind of shorthand script or calligraphic style and is faster to write than other styles, but it can be difficult to read for those unfamiliar with it because of its abstraction and alteration of character structures. People who can read only standard or printed forms of Chinese or related scripts may have difficulty reading the cursive script.

== Names ==
The character 草 cǎo primarily means "grass", and the character 書 shū means script in this context, which has led to the literal calque for 草書 as "grass script". However, 草 can be extended to mean "hurried" or "rough", from which the name 草書 came. Thus, the name of this script is literally "draft script", "quick script" or "rough script". The character 草 appears in this sense, for example, in 草稿 (Modern Mandarin cǎogǎo, "rough draft") and 草擬 (cǎonǐ, "to draft [a document or plan]"). The use of "cursive script" as the English translation was adopted in the early 20th century, and has become the mainstream translation, being widely used in academia and also by the British Museum in London and the Metropolitan Museum of Art in New York.

== History ==
Cursive script originated in China through two phases during the period from the Han to Jin dynasties. Firstly, an early form of cursive developed as a cursory way to write the popular but hitherto immature clerical script. Faster ways to write characters developed through four mechanisms: omitting part of a graph, merging strokes together, replacing portions with abbreviated forms (such as one stroke to replace four dots), or modifying stroke styles. This evolution can best be seen on extant bamboo and wooden slats from the period, on which the use of early cursive and immature clerical forms is intermingled. This early form of cursive script, based on clerical script, is now called zhāngcǎo (章草), and variously also termed ancient cursive, draft cursive or clerical cursive in English, to differentiate it from modern cursive (今草 jīncǎo). Modern cursive evolved from this older cursive in the Wei Kingdom to Jin dynasty with influence from the semi-cursive and standard styles.

== Styles ==
Besides zhāngcǎo and "modern cursive", there is also "wild cursive" (Chinese and Japanese: 狂草; pinyin: kuángcǎo; rōmaji: kyōsō) which is even more cursive and difficult to read. When it was developed by Zhang Xu and Huaisu in the Tang dynasty, they were called Diān Zhāng Zuì Sù (crazy Zhang and drunk Su, 顛張醉素). Cursive, in this style, is no longer significant in legibility but rather in artistry.

Cursive scripts can be divided into the unconnected style (Chinese: 獨草; pinyin: dúcǎo; Japanese: 独草; rōmaji: dokusō) where each character is separate, and the connected style (Chinese: 連綿; pinyin: liánmián; Japanese: 連綿体; rōmaji: renmentai) where each character is connected to the succeeding one.

== Derived characters ==
Many simplified Chinese characters are derived from the standard script rendition of their corresponding cursive form (Chinese: 草書楷化; pinyin: cǎoshūkǎihuà), e.g. 书, 东.

Cursive script forms of Chinese characters are also the origin of the Japanese hiragana script. Specifically, hiragana developed from cursive forms of the man'yōgana script, called sōgana (草仮名). In Japan, the sōgana cursive script was considered to be suitable for women's writing, and thus came to be referred to as women’s script (女手, onnade). Onnade was later applied to hiragana as well. In contrast, kanji was referred to as men’s script (男手, otokode).

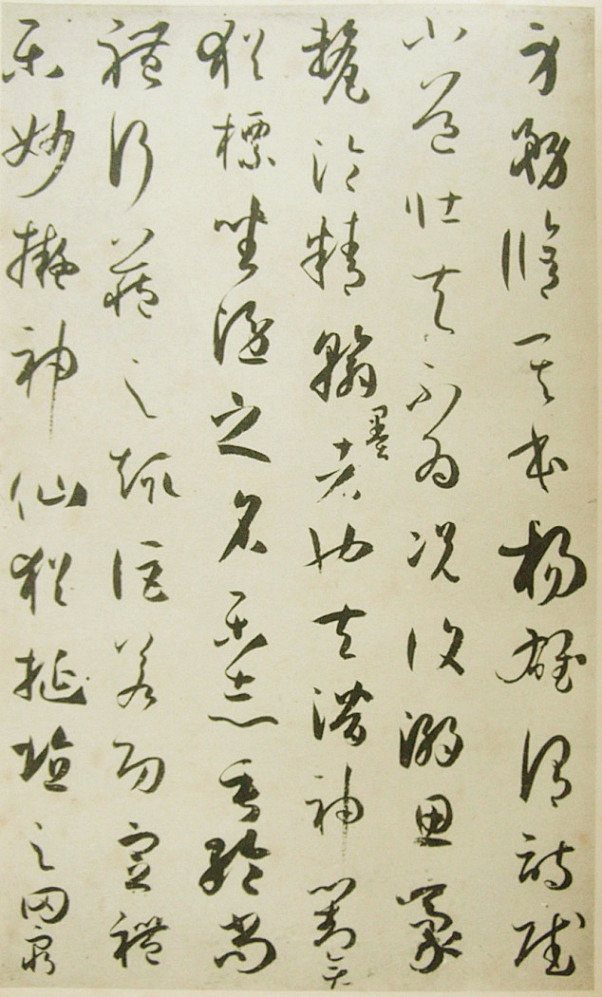
Cursive script in Sun Guoting's Treatise on Calligraphy

Chinese characters of "Cursive Script" in regular script (left) and cursive script (right). The cursive form contains only three strokes, seventeen fewer strokes than the regular counterpart.

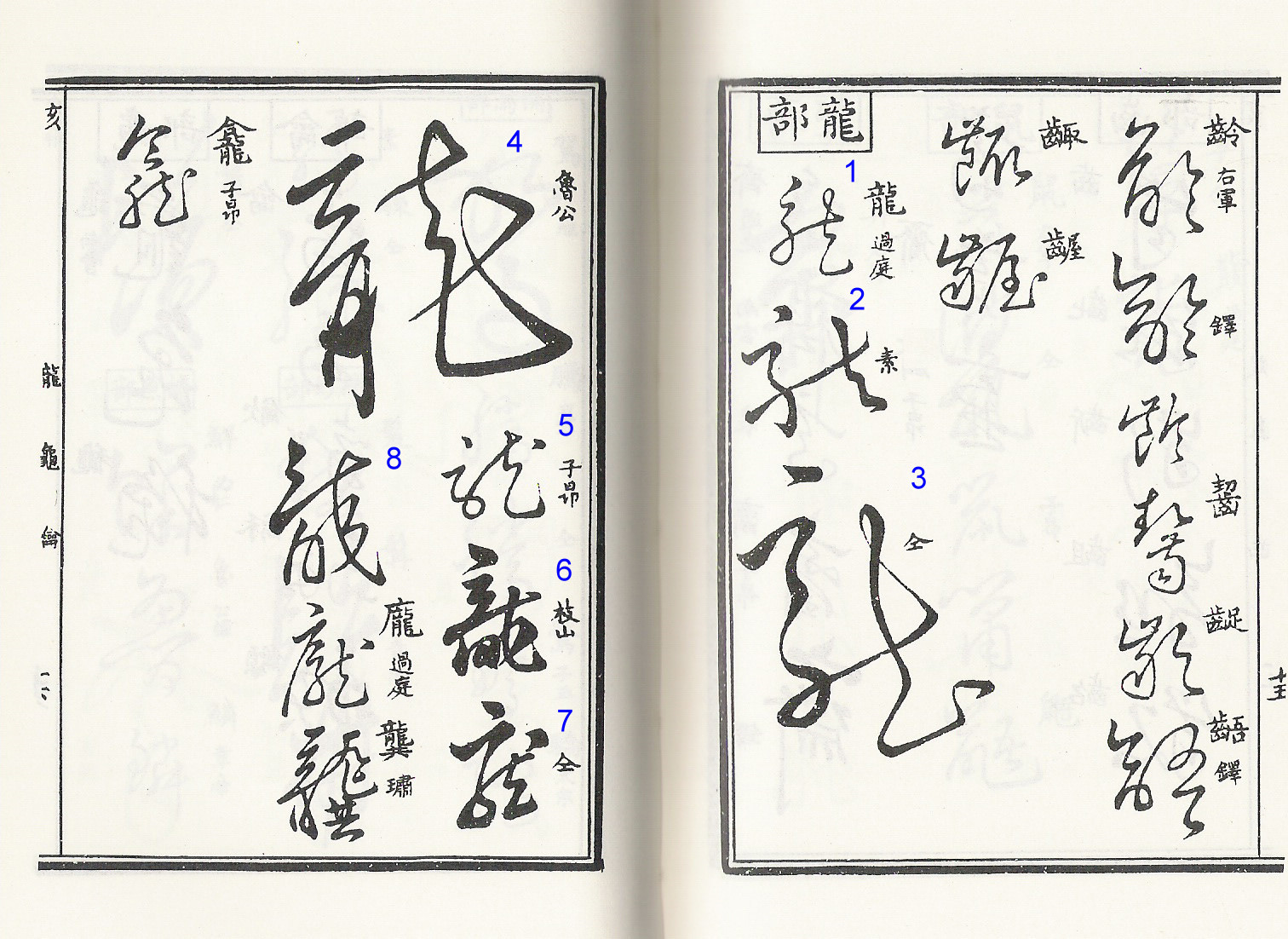
Eight different cursive representations of the character 龍 ('dragon'), from Compilation of Cursive Characters (《草字彙》), authored by Shi Liang (石梁) of the Qing dynasty. The artists are: 1 Sun Guoting; 2, 3 Huaisu; 4 Yan Zhenqing; 5 Zhao Mengfu; 6, 7 Zhu Zhishan; 8 anonymous.

== Notable calligraphers ==
- Huaisu
- Wang Xizhi
- Wang Xianzhi
- Wen Zhengming
- Yu Youren
- Zhang Zhi, sage of Cursive Script
- Zhang Xu
