= Blue-green shan shui =

Chinese landscape painting style

'Blue-green shan shui, also known as qinglü shanshui (simplified Chinese: 青绿山水; traditional Chinese: 青綠山水; pinyin: qīnglǜ shānshuǐ; literally blue-green mountain-water'), is a variety of shan shui, a style of Chinese painting that primarily depicts scenery. It tends to refer to an "ancient style" rather than modern ones. The main colours of the paintings are blues and greens, and in the early period it was painted using mineral dyes. This style was first formulated by Li Sixun (simplified Chinese: 李思训; traditional Chinese: 李思訓; pinyin: Lǐ Sī-Xùn), a general, politician, and famous painter in the Tang dynasty.

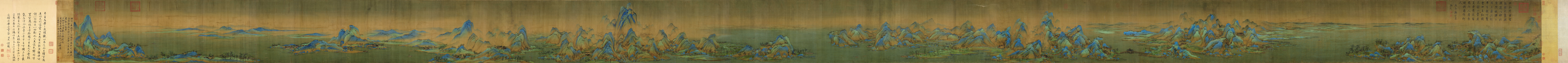
A Thousand Li of Rivers and Mountains, Wang Ximeng, Song dynasty.

== History and sub-styles ==
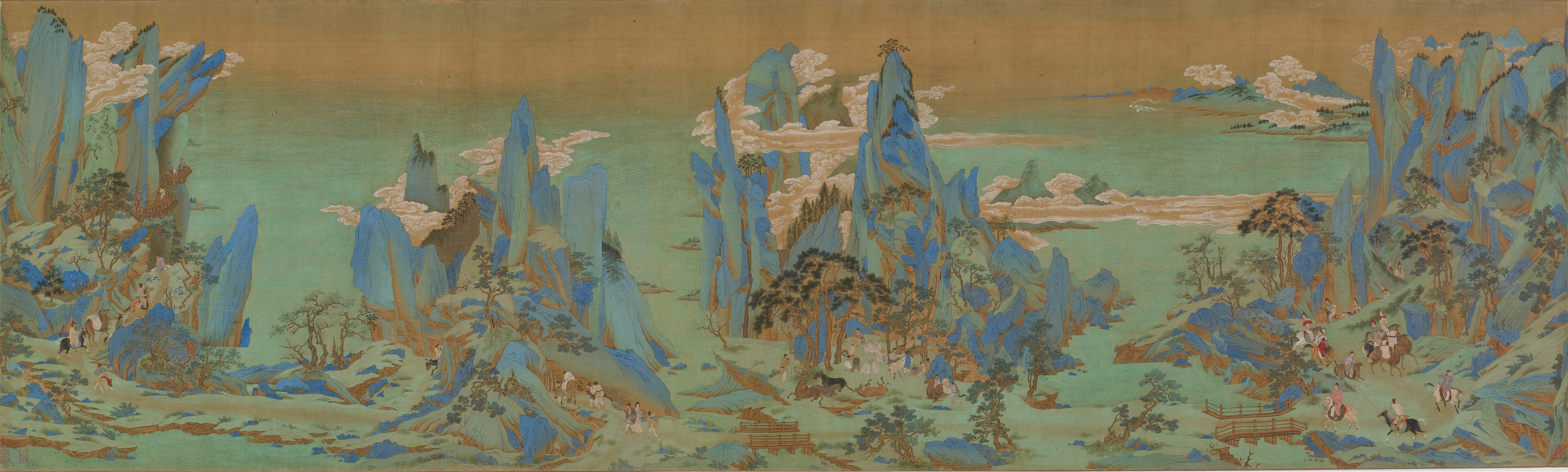
Emperor Minghuang's Journey to Sichuan; a blue-green shan shui painting depicting the flight of Emperor Xuanzong from Chang'an, a late Ming dynasty painting after an original by Qiu Ying (1494–1552).

Similar styles appeared before the Tang dynasty, especially in the period of the Six Dynasties. Many historic records show that Li father and sons – Li Sixun (father) and Li Zhaodao (son, Chinese: 李昭道; pinyin: Lǐ Zhāo-Dào, son of Li Sixun), largely developed the painting techniques and formulated the style. It was most frequently used during the Song dynasty.

There are mainly two styles of this painting:

- Shibi Qingyuan (simplified Chinese: 式笔青綠; traditional Chinese: 式筆青綠; pinyin: Shì-Bǐ Qīng-Lǜ)
- Yibi Qingyuan (Chinese: 意笔青綠; pinyin: Yì-bǐ Qīng-Lǜ)

== Schools ==
Tang dynasty:

- General blue-green shan shui.

Late Northern Song dynasty:

- Bright green shan shui (Chinese: 金碧山水; pinyin: Jīn-Bì Shān-Shuǐ)
- Great blue-green shan shui (simplified Chinese: 大青绿山水; traditional Chinese: 大青綠山水; pinyin: Dà Qīng-Lǜ Shān-Shuǐ)
- Little blue-green shan shui (simplified Chinese: 小青绿山水; traditional Chinese: 小青綠山水; pinyin: Xiǎo Qīng-Lǜ Shān-Shuǐ)

Yuan dynasty, Ming dynasty and Qing dynasty:

- The little blue-green shan shui is the dominant style/school. Especially in the Late Ming dynasty, the painter Lan Ying (Chinese: 蓝瑛; Pinyin: Lán Yīng) from Zhe School (Chinese: 浙派) developed the style to an historic climax.

== See also ==
- Chinese painting
- Shanshui
