= Five Peaks Garden =

Classical garden in Suzhou, China

- Wufeng Garden
- 五峰园
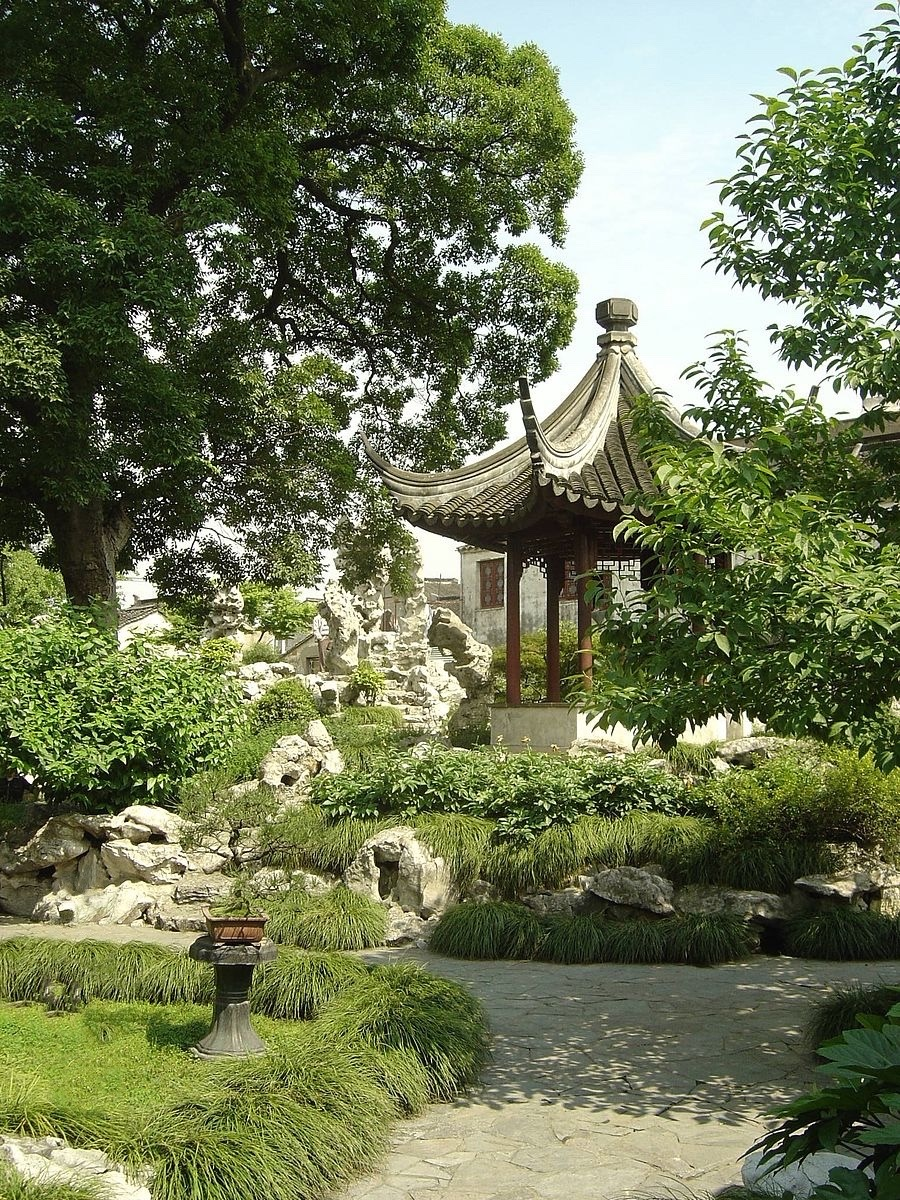
- Wufeng Garden
- Interactive map of Five Peaks Garden
- Location: Changmin West Street
- Nearest city: Suzhou, China
- Coordinates: 31.317215°N 120.607226°E
- Area: 1,290 m^{2} (13,900 sq ft)
- Created: 1522-1566
- Designated: cultural relic protection unit
- Founder: Wen Boren
- Designer: Suzhou gardens administration
- Etymology: Five rocks within the garden
- Owner: Jiangsu Province
- Administrator: Suzhou gardens
- Status: Active
- Terrain: Rockery
- Water: Pond

Five Peaks Garden (Chinese: 五峰园) or Wufeng Garden is a classical Chinese garden located in Suzhou, China. The original garden dates to the Ming dynasty and was the site of painter Wen Boren's home. In 1979 authorities began restoration of the gardens. Since 2002, the Garden has become a protected area which is maintained by the Suzhou gardens administration. The garden takes its name from five rock peaks which are found on the grounds.

== History ==
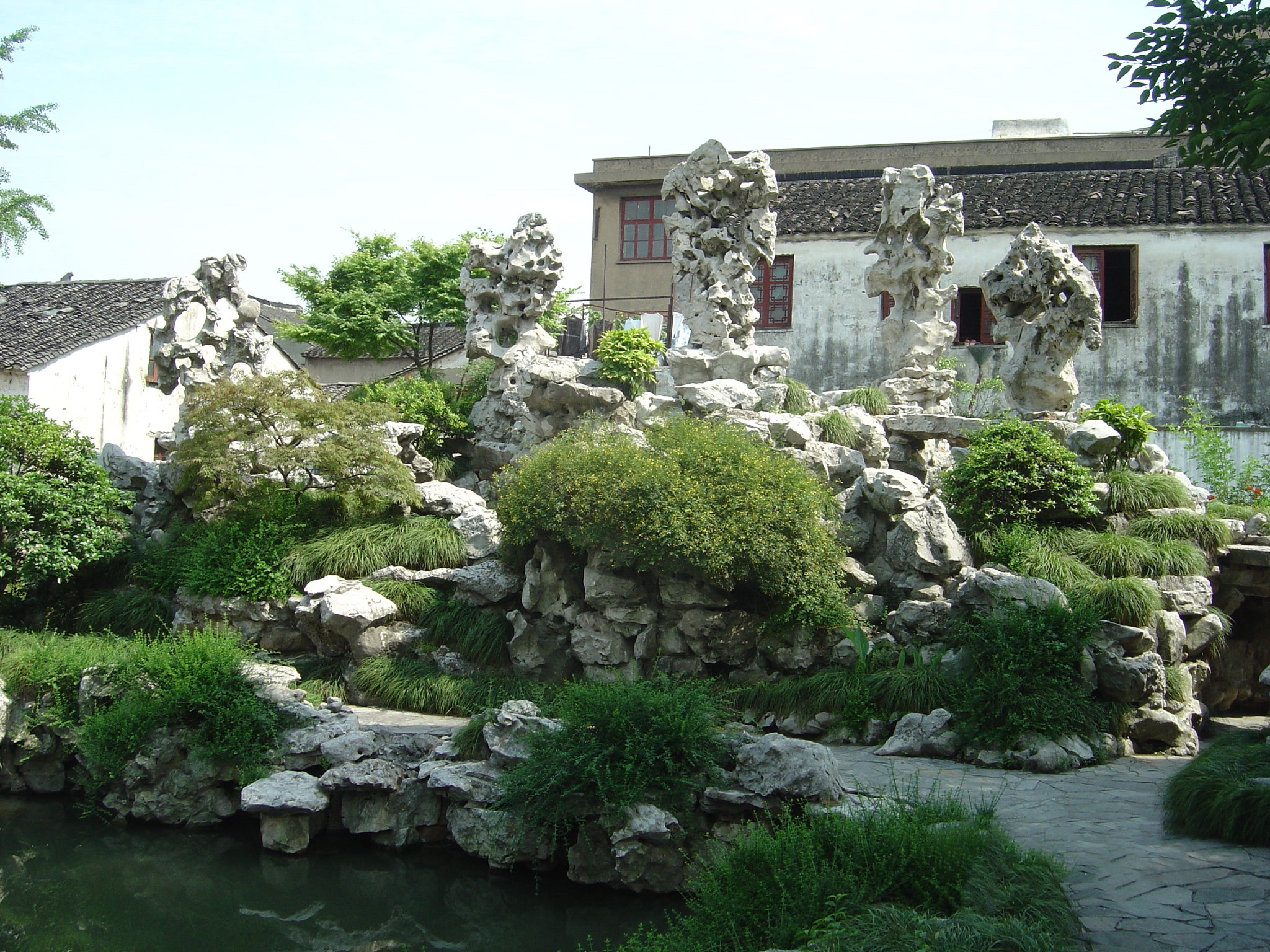
Taihu stone peaks in Wufeng Garden

The garden is named after the five rocks within the garden. The garden was built during the Ming dynasty (1522-1566) by painter Wen Boren. Wen Boren built his home in the garden, and after he moved, a bureaucrat named Yang Cheng purchased the property. When Cheng moved, the property was developed with residential buildings. The property then changed hands many times over the years until it became a restoration project. In 1979 authorities began restoration efforts for the garden.

In 1998 Suzhou gardens administration renovated the buildings which were on the site. In 2002, Jiangsu province listed the garden as a cultural relic protection unit.

== Description ==
The total area of the gardens is 1,290 m^{2} (13,900 sq ft). There is a pool of water and several buildings.

The five stone peaks are the garden's main feature and namesake. There is also a tea house in the garden. Rocks, stones and constructed hills are a feature of many gardens in Suzhou. Taihu Lake rocks were used to create peaks in many of the gardens. The rock peaks in the Wufeng garden are each about 7 m (23 ft) high. The rockery of the garden was all built of Taihu stones, and it was carefully separated by Wen Boren.
