= Wen Boren =

Chinese landscape painter

- 文伯仁
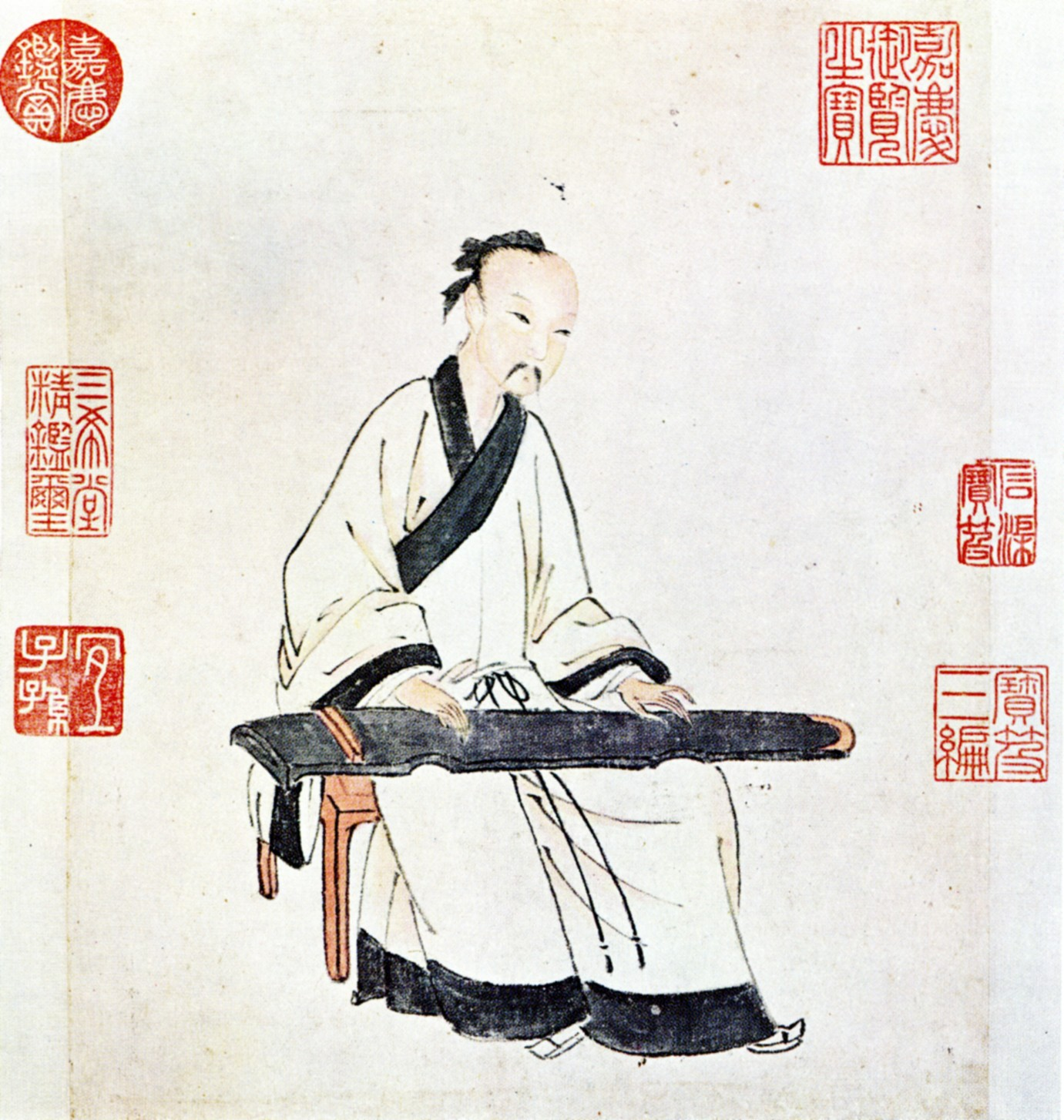
- Yang Jijing playing a lute, by Wen Boren
- Born: 1502; Changzhou
- Died: 1575 (aged 72–73)
- Known for: Landscape painting; Literati painting
- Style: Ink wash painting
- Relatives: Uncle: Wen Zhengming

Wen Boren (Chinese: 文伯仁; pinyin: Wén Bórén; Wade–Giles: Wen Po-jen); ca. (1502–1575) was a Chinese landscape painter during the Ming Dynasty (1368–1644).

== Early life ==
Wen was born in Changzhou (present day Wuxian of Jiangsu province). His style name was 'Du Cheng' (德承) and his pseudonyms were 'Wu Feng' (五峰), 'Bao Sheng' (葆生), and 'She Sheng Lao Nong' (摄山老农). He was the nephew of the famous painter Wen Zhengming.

== Career ==
He was known as a landscape painter but he also painted figures. He belonged to the Wu School which painted in the style of the Yuan dynasty. The style of painting Boren used was known as Literati painting or ink wash. He worked out of the studio of his uncle Wen Zhengming; studying the works of the old masters.

One of his paintings titled "River Landscape with Towering Mountains" is housed at the Seattle Art Museum and it is a hanging scroll Ink and color on paper.

== Personal life ==
The Wufeng Garden in Suzhou, China is named after five rocks within the garden The garden was built by Wen Boren and he had his home there.
