= Chinese painting =

Artistic tradition

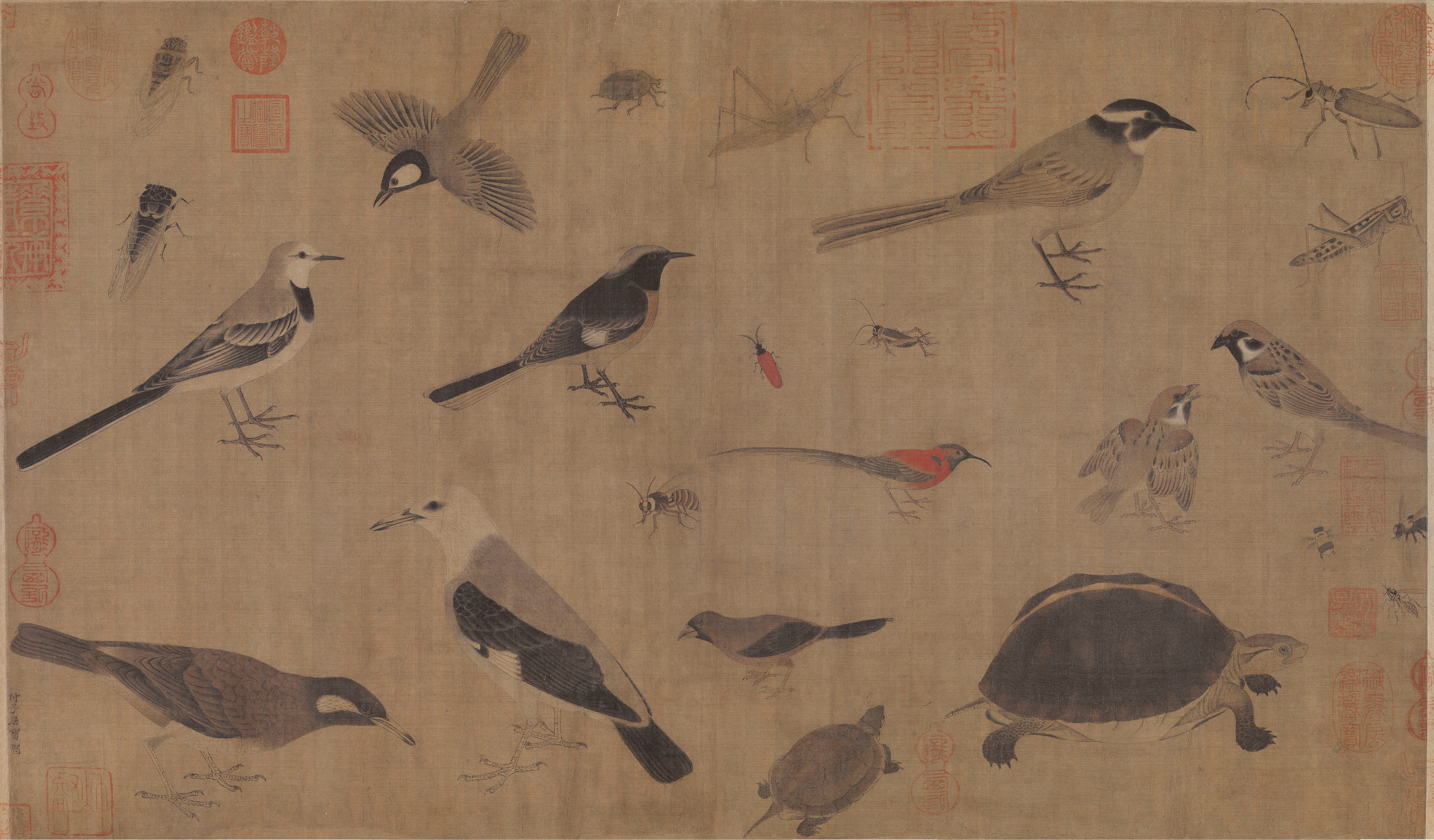
- Huang Quan's Almanac of Birds and Beasts; Later Shu, c. 950 CE.
- Traditional Chinese: 中國畫
- Simplified Chinese: 中国画
Transcriptions
Standard Mandarin
- Hanyu Pinyin: Zhōngguó huà

Chinese painting (simplified Chinese: 中国画; traditional Chinese: 中國畫; pinyin: Zhōngguó huà) is one of the oldest continuous artistic traditions in the world. Painting in the traditional style is known today in Chinese as guó huà (国画; 國畫), meaning "national painting" or "native painting", as opposed to Western styles of art which became popular in China in the 20th century. It is also called danqing (Chinese: 丹青; pinyin: dān qīng). Traditional painting involves essentially the same techniques as calligraphy and is done with a brush dipped in black ink or coloured pigments; oils are not used. As with calligraphy, the most popular materials on which paintings are made are paper and silk. The finished work can be mounted on scrolls, such as hanging scrolls or handscrolls. Traditional painting can also be done on album sheets, walls, lacquerware, folding screens, and other media.

The two main techniques in Chinese painting are:

- Gongbi (工筆), meaning "meticulous", uses highly detailed brushstrokes that delimit details very precisely. It is often highly colored and usually depicts figural or narrative subjects. It is often practiced by artists working for the royal court or in independent workshops.
- Ink and wash painting, in Chinese shuǐ-mò (水墨, "water and ink") also loosely termed watercolor or brush painting, and also known as "literati painting", as it was one of the "four arts" of the Chinese Scholar-official class. In theory this was an art practiced by gentlemen, a distinction that begins to be made in writings on art from the Song dynasty, though in fact the careers of leading exponents could benefit considerably. This style is also referred to as "xieyi" (寫意) or freehand style.

Landscape painting was regarded as the highest form of Chinese painting, and generally still is. The time from the Five Dynasties period to the Northern Song period (907–1127) is known as the "Great Age of Chinese landscape". In the north, artists such as Jing Hao, Li Cheng, Fan Kuan, and Guo Xi painted pictures of towering mountains, using strong black lines, ink wash, and sharp, dotted brushstrokes to suggest rough stone. In the south, Dong Yuan, Juran, and other artists painted the rolling hills and rivers of their native countryside in peaceful scenes done with softer, rubbed brushwork. These two kinds of scenes and techniques became the classical styles of Chinese landscape painting.

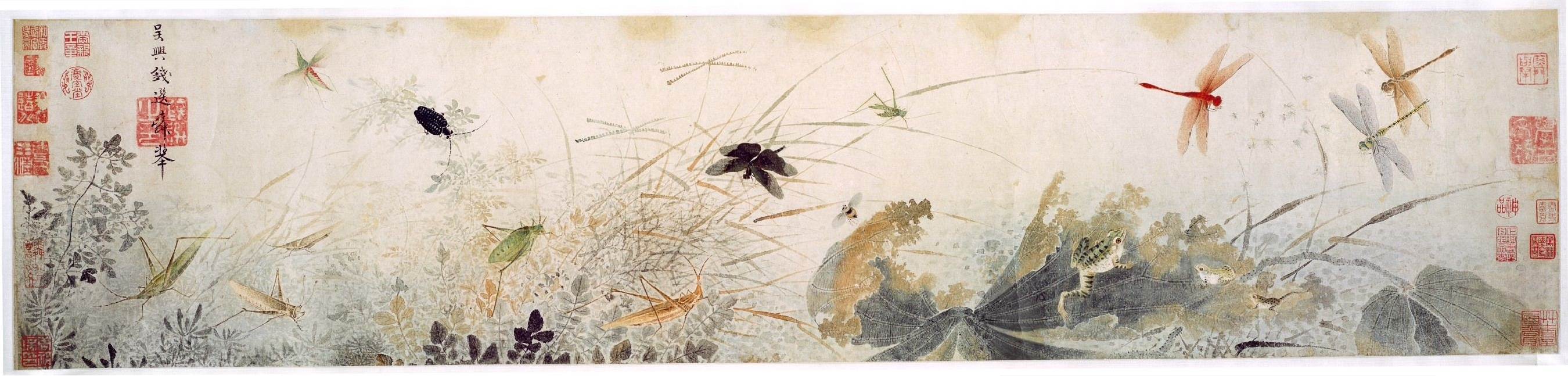
Early Autumn by Qian Xuan (1235–1305)

== Specifics and study ==
Chinese painting and calligraphy distinguish themselves from other cultures' arts by emphasis on motion and change with dynamic life. The practice is traditionally first learned by rote, in which the master shows the "right way" to draw items. The apprentice must copy these items strictly and continuously until the movements become instinctive. In contemporary times, debate emerged on the limits of this copyist tradition within modern art scenes where innovation is the rule. Changing lifestyles, tools, and colors are also influencing new waves of masters.

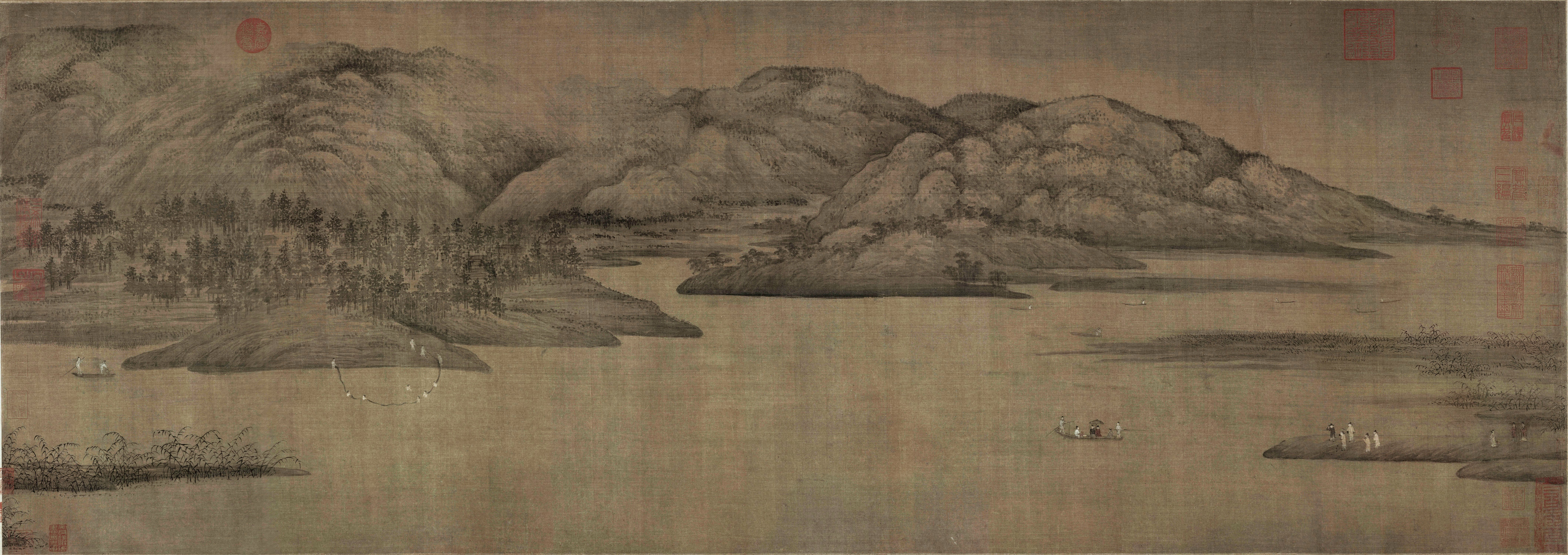
Views of Xiaoxiang by Dong Yuan (932–962). Dong is considered as one of the originators of landscape painting styles; the scales of such paintings were often huge, with minuscule yet intricate pastoralist subjects showing the relative enormity of the landscape. Zoom into the left to see a group of men engaging in seine-haul fishing.

== Early periods ==
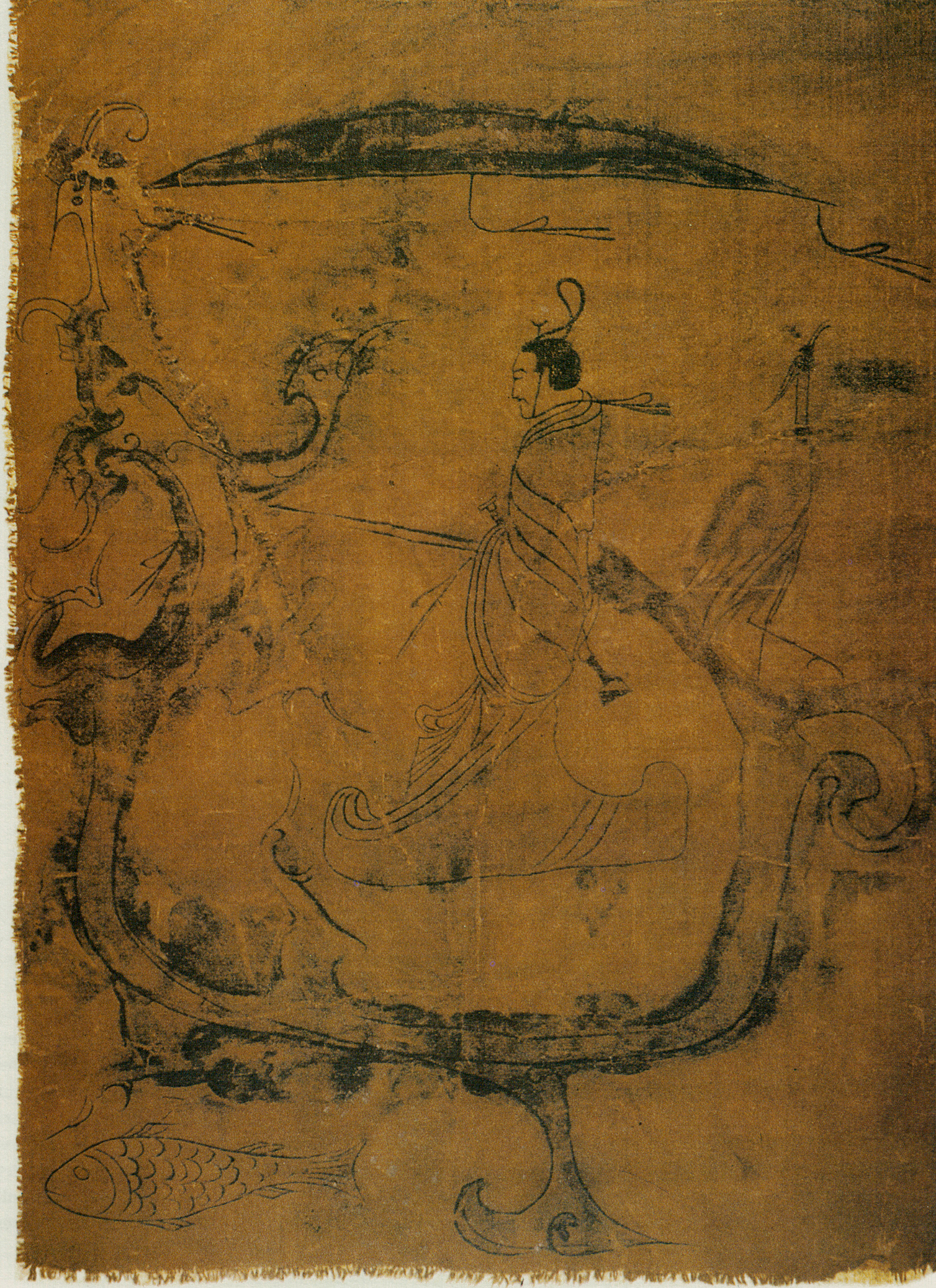
Silk painting depicting a man riding a dragon, 5th century BCE.

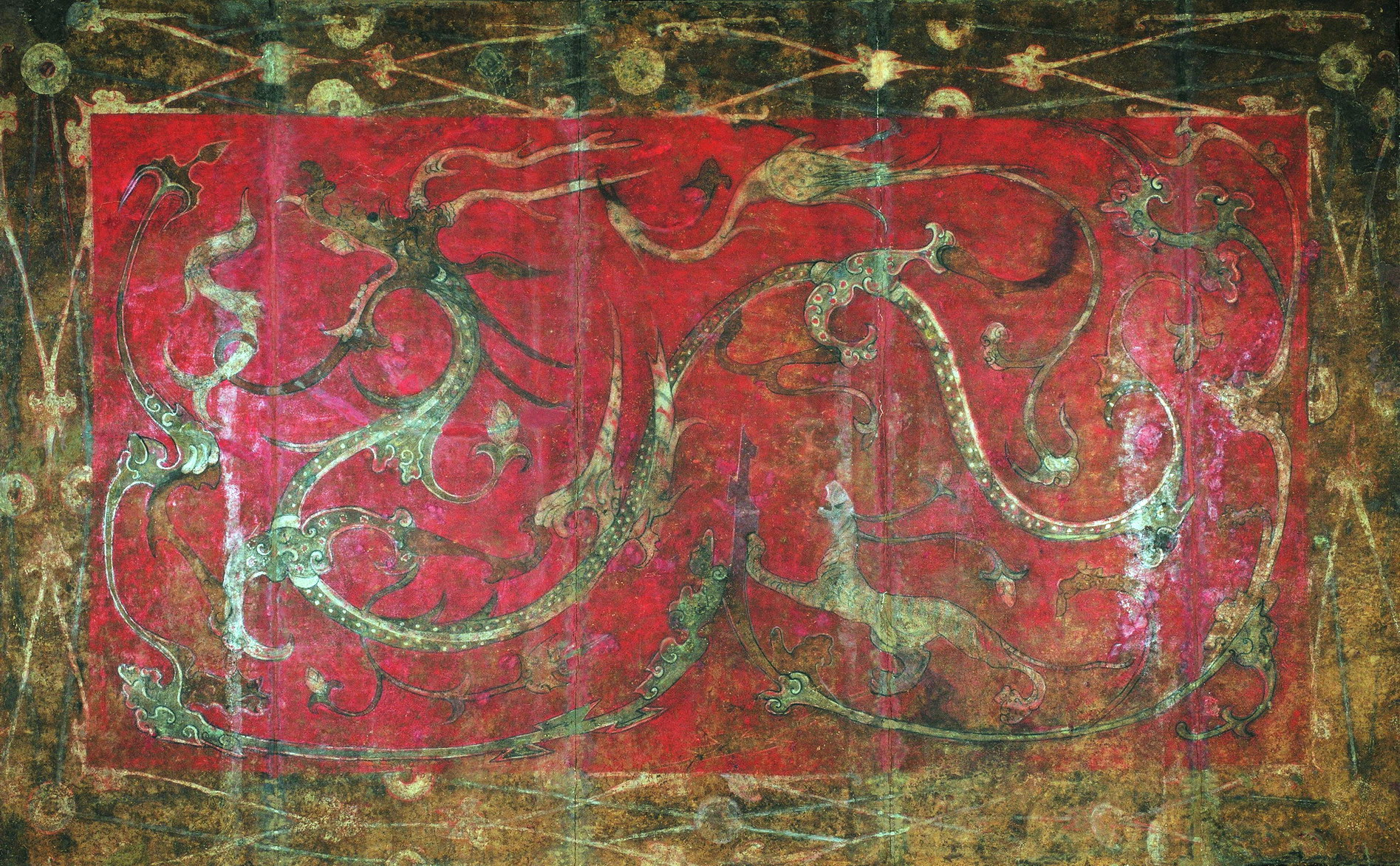
Western Han lacquered dragon mural, c. 2nd century BCE

The earliest paintings were not representational but ornamental; they consisted of patterns or designs rather than pictures. Early pottery was painted with spirals, zigzags, dots, or animals. It was only during the Eastern Zhou (770–256 BC) that artists began to represent the world around them. In imperial times (beginning with the Eastern Jin dynasty), painting and calligraphy in China were among the most highly appreciated arts in the court and they were often practiced by amateurs—aristocrats and scholar-officials—who had the leisure time necessary to perfect the technique and sensibility necessary for great brushwork. Calligraphy and painting were thought to be the purest forms of art. The implements were the brush pen made of animal hair, and black inks made from pine soot and animal glue. In ancient times, writing, as well as painting, was done on silk. However, after the invention of paper in the 1st century AD, silk was gradually replaced by the new and cheaper material. Original writings by famous calligraphers have been greatly valued throughout China's history and are mounted on scrolls and hung on walls in the same way that paintings are.

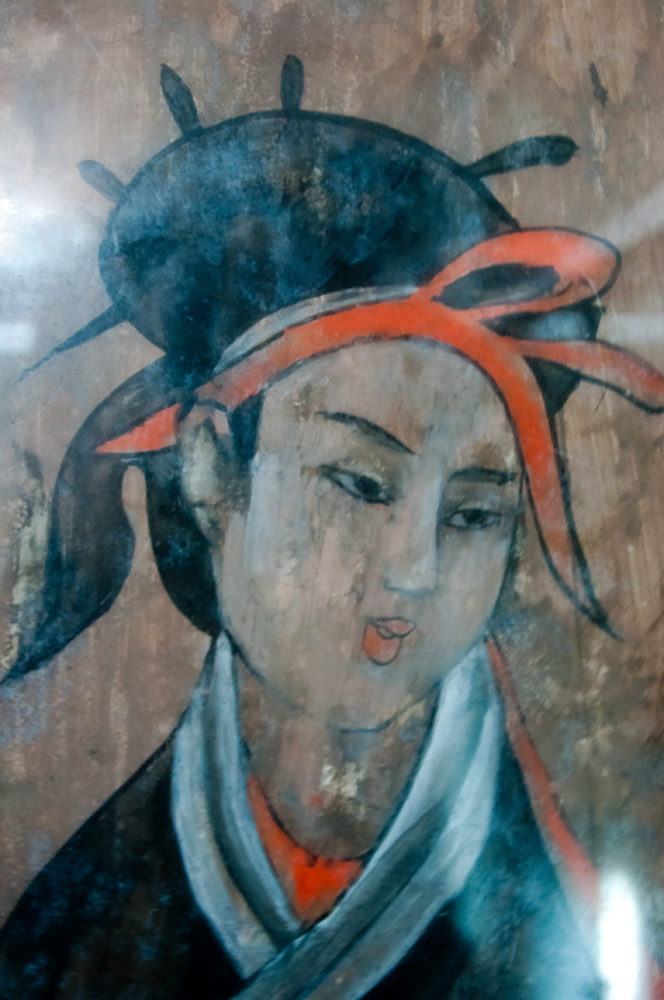
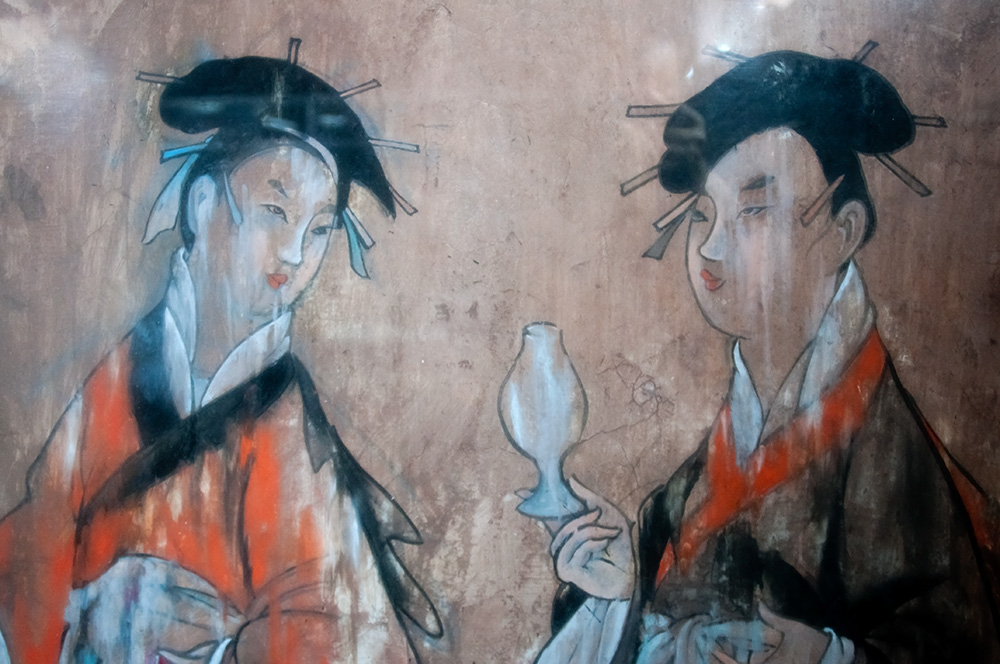
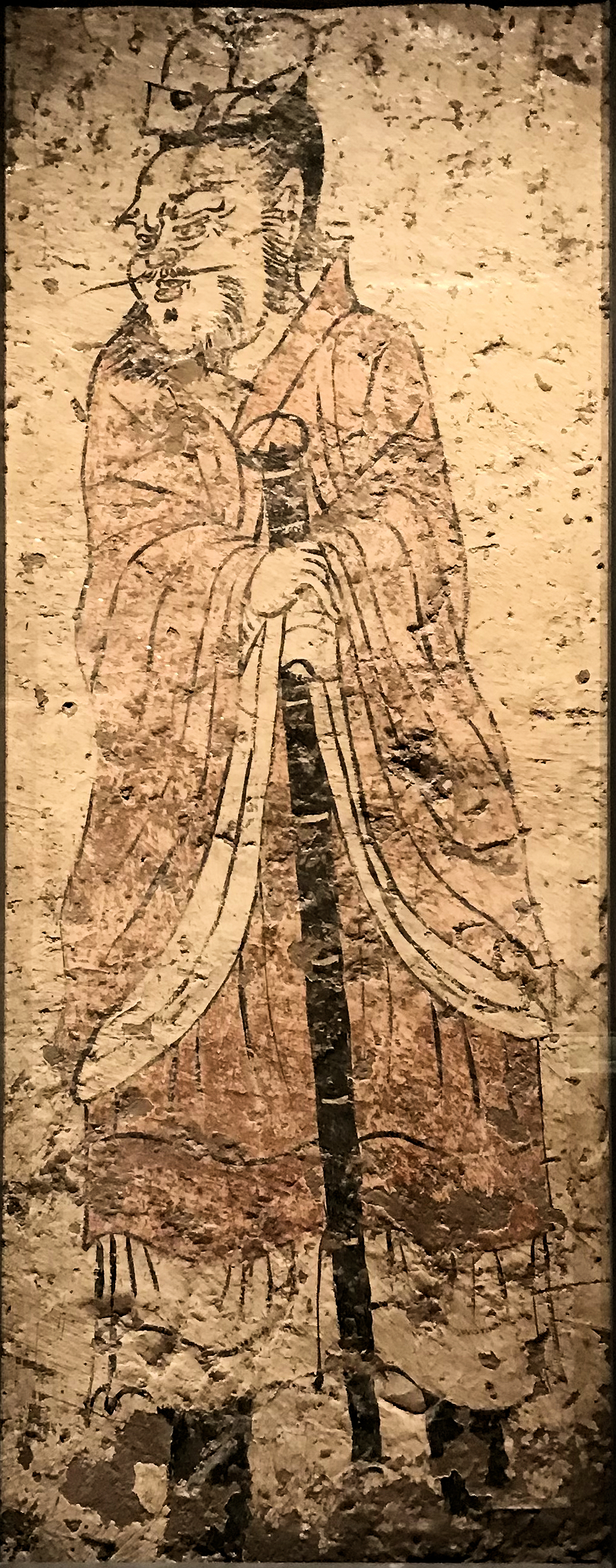
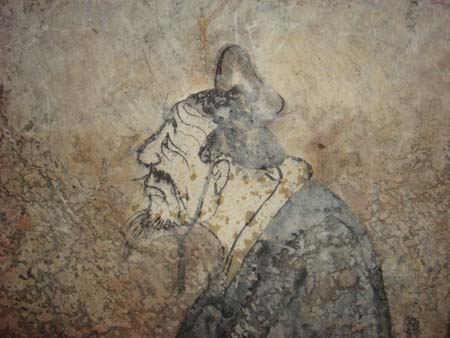
Clockwise from upper left: Detail of a woman and of two women wearing a Hanfu from the Dahuting tombs frescoes, c. 25 CE, fresco of Confucius from the Western Han (202 BCE – 9 CE), fresco from the Tomb of General Li Xian, c. 569 CE

Artists from the Han (206 BC – 220 AD) to the Tang (618–906) dynasties mainly painted the human figure. Much of what we know of early Chinese figure painting comes from burial sites, where paintings were preserved on silk banners, lacquered objects, and tomb walls. Many early tomb paintings were meant to protect the dead or help their souls to get to paradise. Others illustrated the teachings of the Chinese philosopher Confucius or showed scenes of daily life.

During the Six Dynasties period (220–589), people began to appreciate painting for its own beauty and to write about art. From this time we begin to learn about individual artists, such as Gu Kaizhi. Even when these artists illustrated Confucian moral themes – such as the proper behavior of a wife to her husband or of children to their parents – they tried to make the figures graceful.

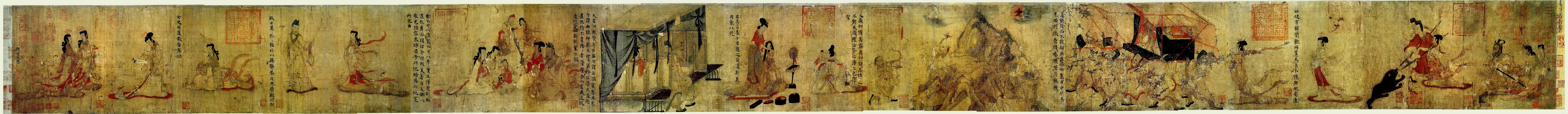
Admonitions Scroll by Gu Kaizhi (348–405), British Museum; heavily damaged after it was looted by a British army officer during the Boxer Rebellion

.

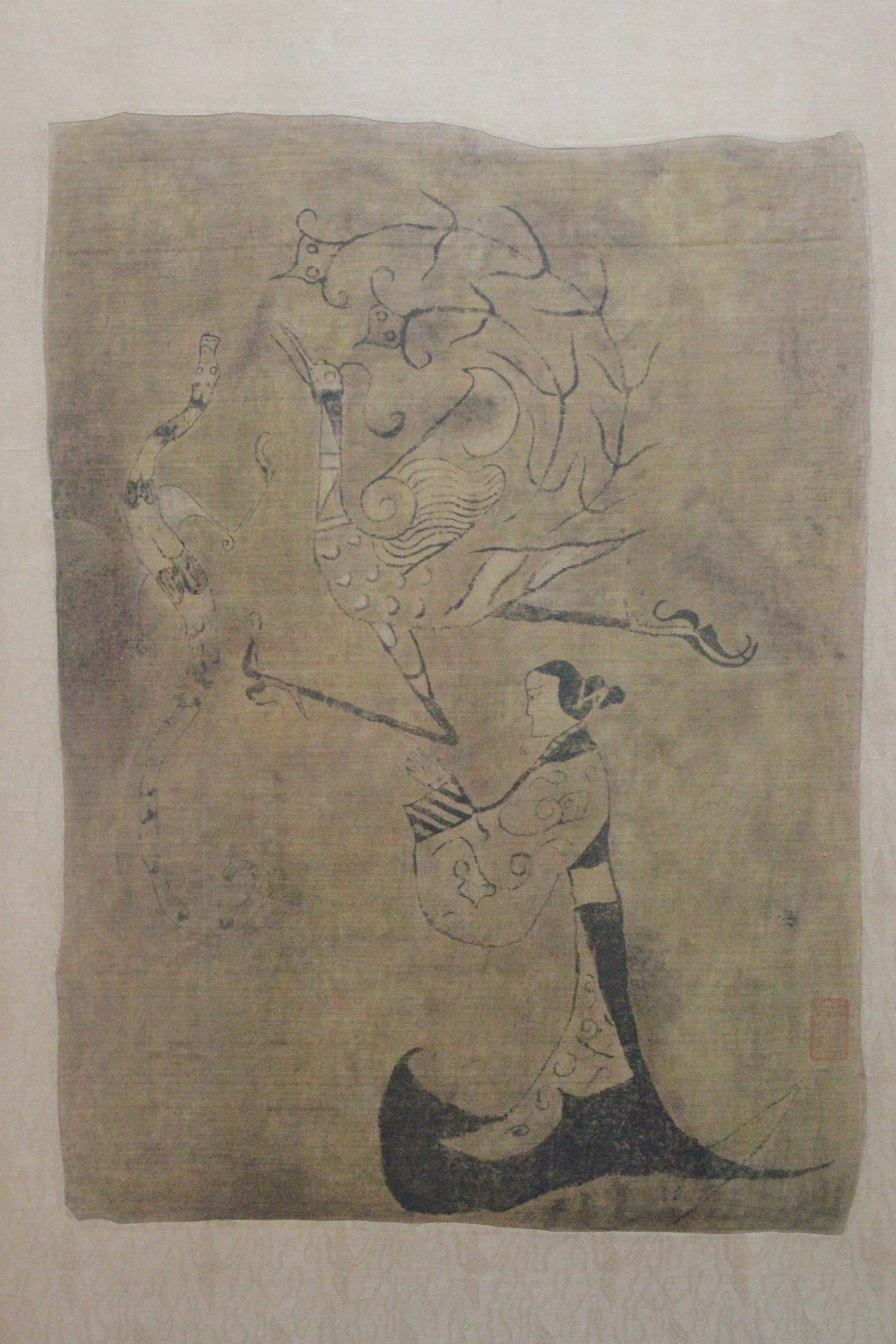
Chu (state) silk painting of woman with phoenix

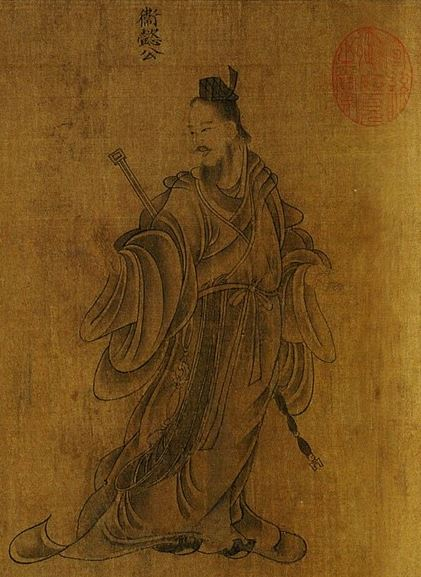
Close-up on another scroll by Gu Kaizhi.

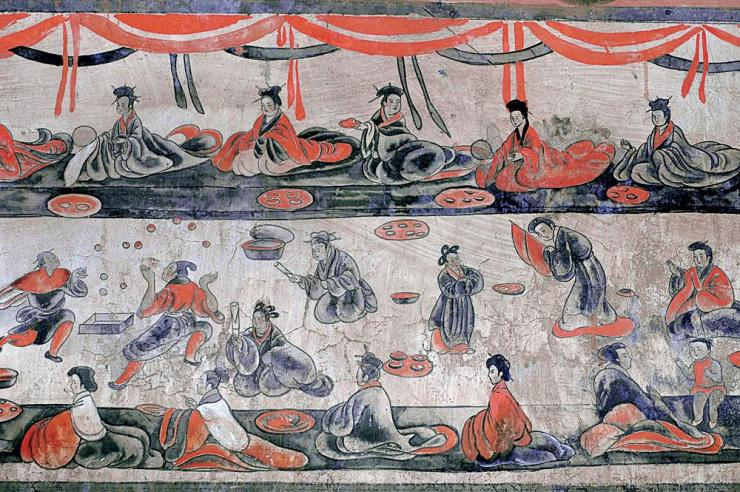
Wall painting from Dahuting tomb, c.2nd century AD

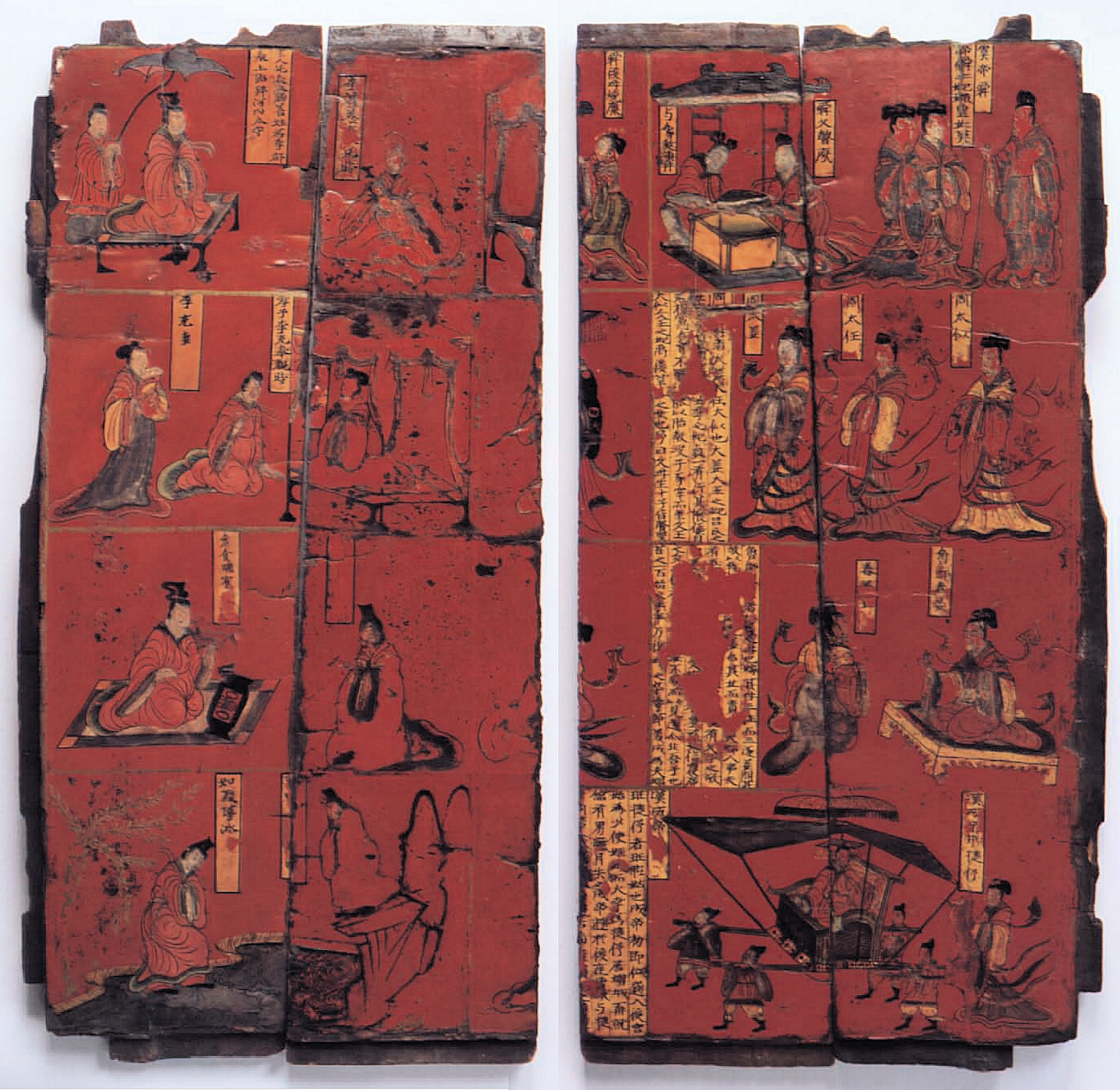
Lacquer screens from the tomb of Sima Jinlong (420–484)

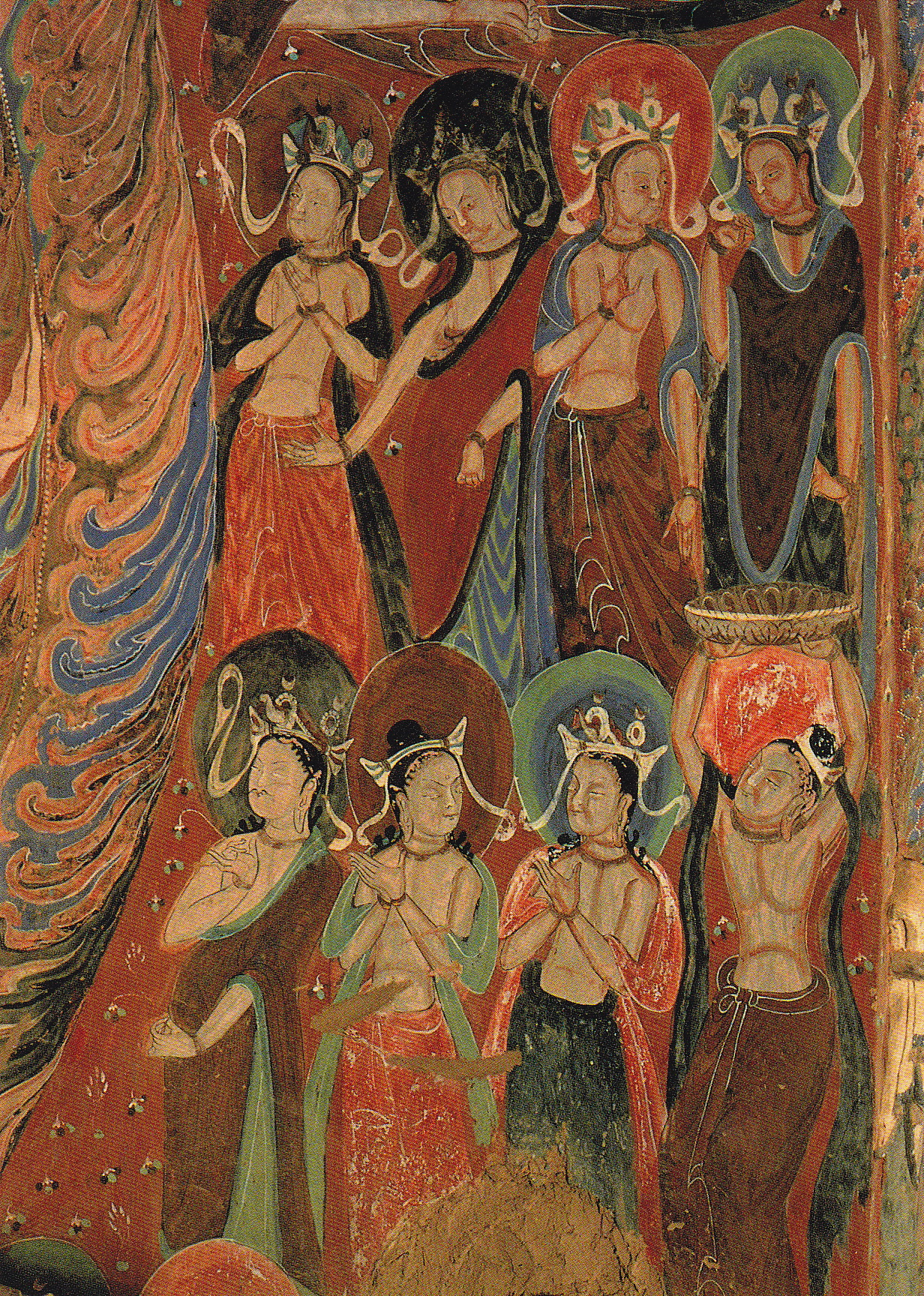
Mural from the Mogao caves, Western Wei, (535–556 A.D.)

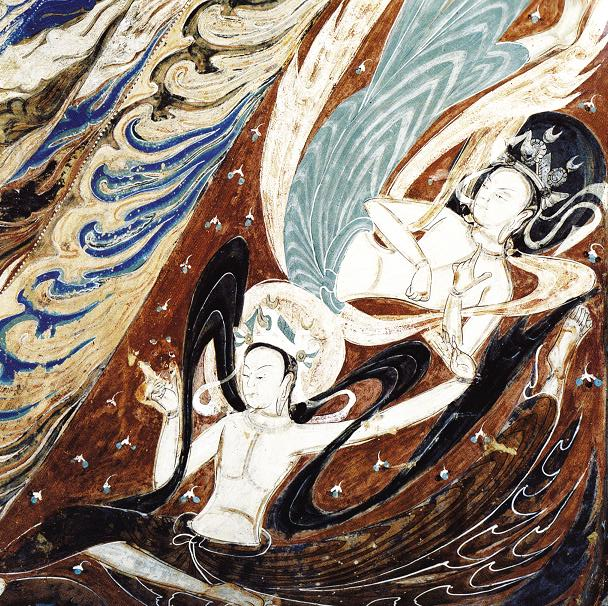
Dunhuang mural, mid-6th century

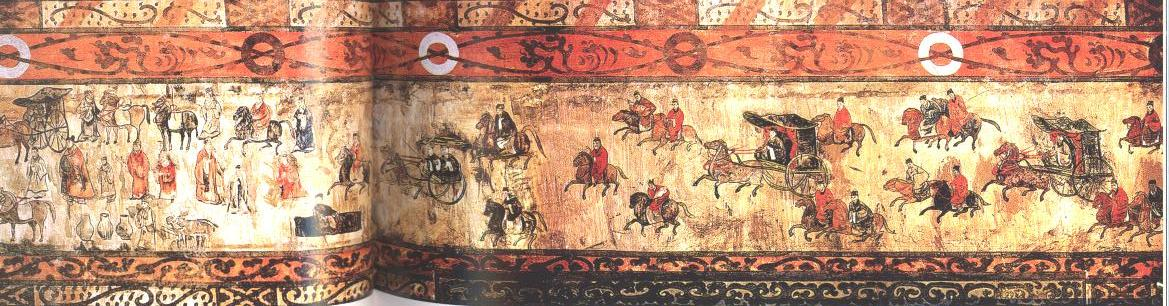
Mural of chariots and cavalry from Dahuting tomb, 2nd century AD

=== Six principles ===
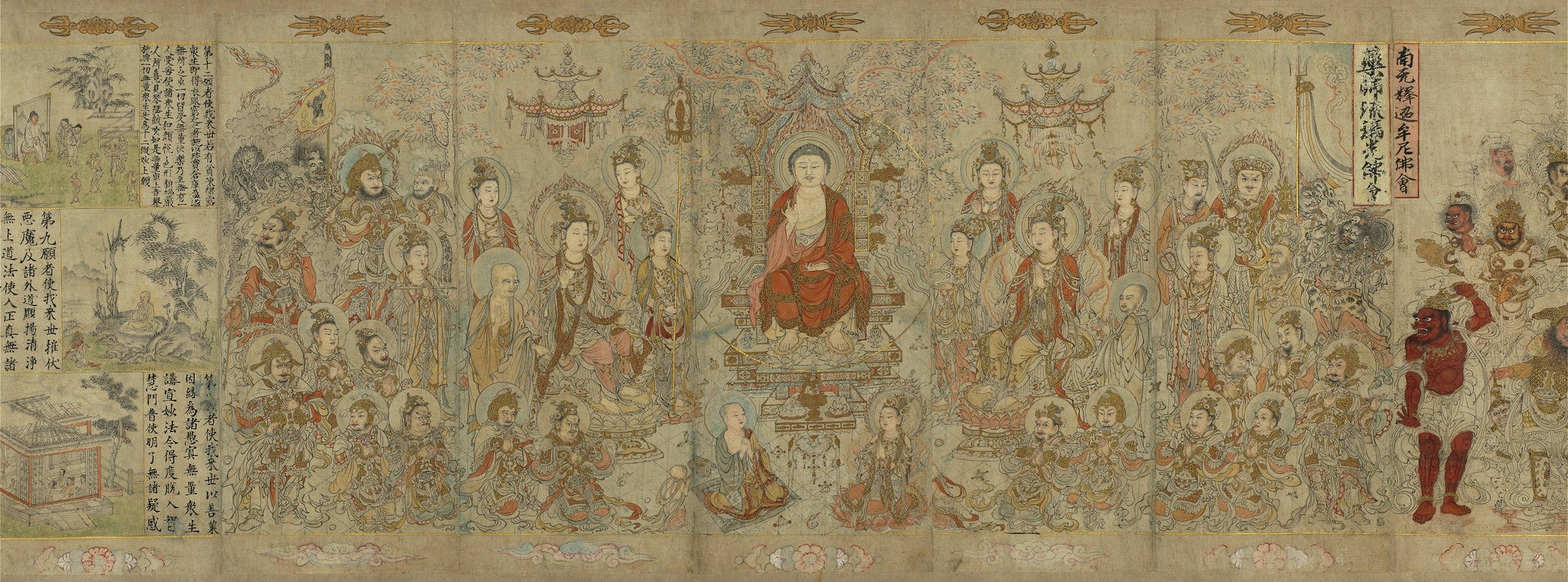
The Sakyamuni Buddha, by Zhang Shengwen, 1173–1176 CE, Song dynasty

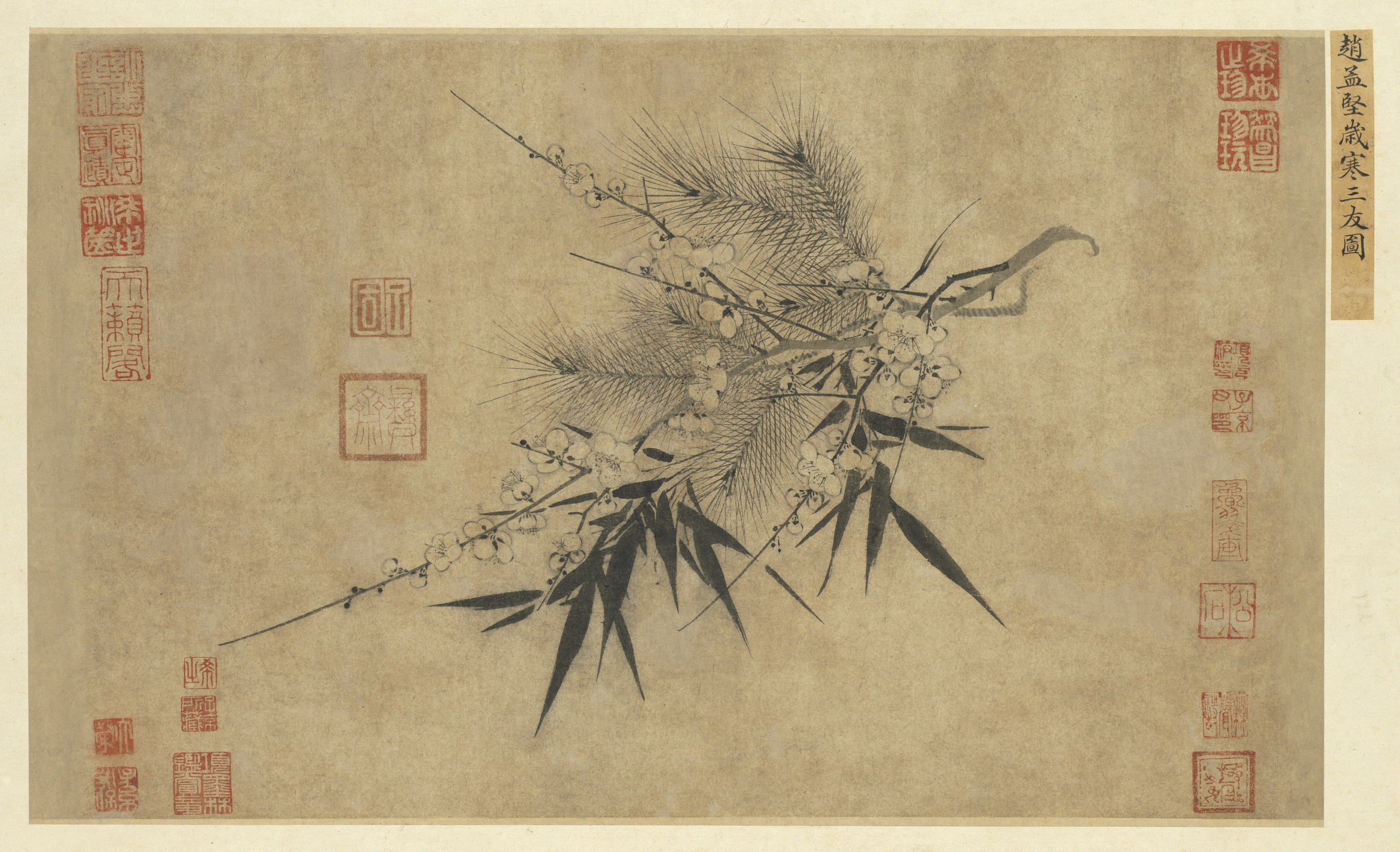
Three Friends of Winter by Zhao Mengjian, 13th century

The "Six principles of Chinese painting" were established by Xie He, a artist, art historian and critic of the 5th century, in "Six points to consider when judging a painting" (繪畫六法, Pinyin: Huìhuà Liùfǎ), taken from the preface to his book "The Record of the Classification of Old Painters" (古畫品錄; Pinyin: Gǔhuà Pǐnlù). This was written circa 550 CE and refers to what were already considered "old" and "ancient" practices. The six elements that define a painting are:

1. "Spirit Resonance", or vitality, which refers to the flow of energy that encompasses theme, work, and artist. Xie He said that without Spirit Resonance, there was no need to look further.
2. "Bone Method", or the way of using the brush, refers not only to texture and brush stroke, but to the close link between handwriting and personality. In his day, the art of calligraphy was inseparable from painting.
3. "Correspondence to the Object", or the depicting of form, which would include shape and line.
4. "Suitability to Type", or the application of color, including layers, value, and tone.
5. "Division and Planning", or placing and arrangement, corresponding to composition, space, and depth.
6. "Transmission by Copying", or the copying of models, not from life only but also from the works of antiquity.

== Sui, Tang and Five dynasties (581–979) ==
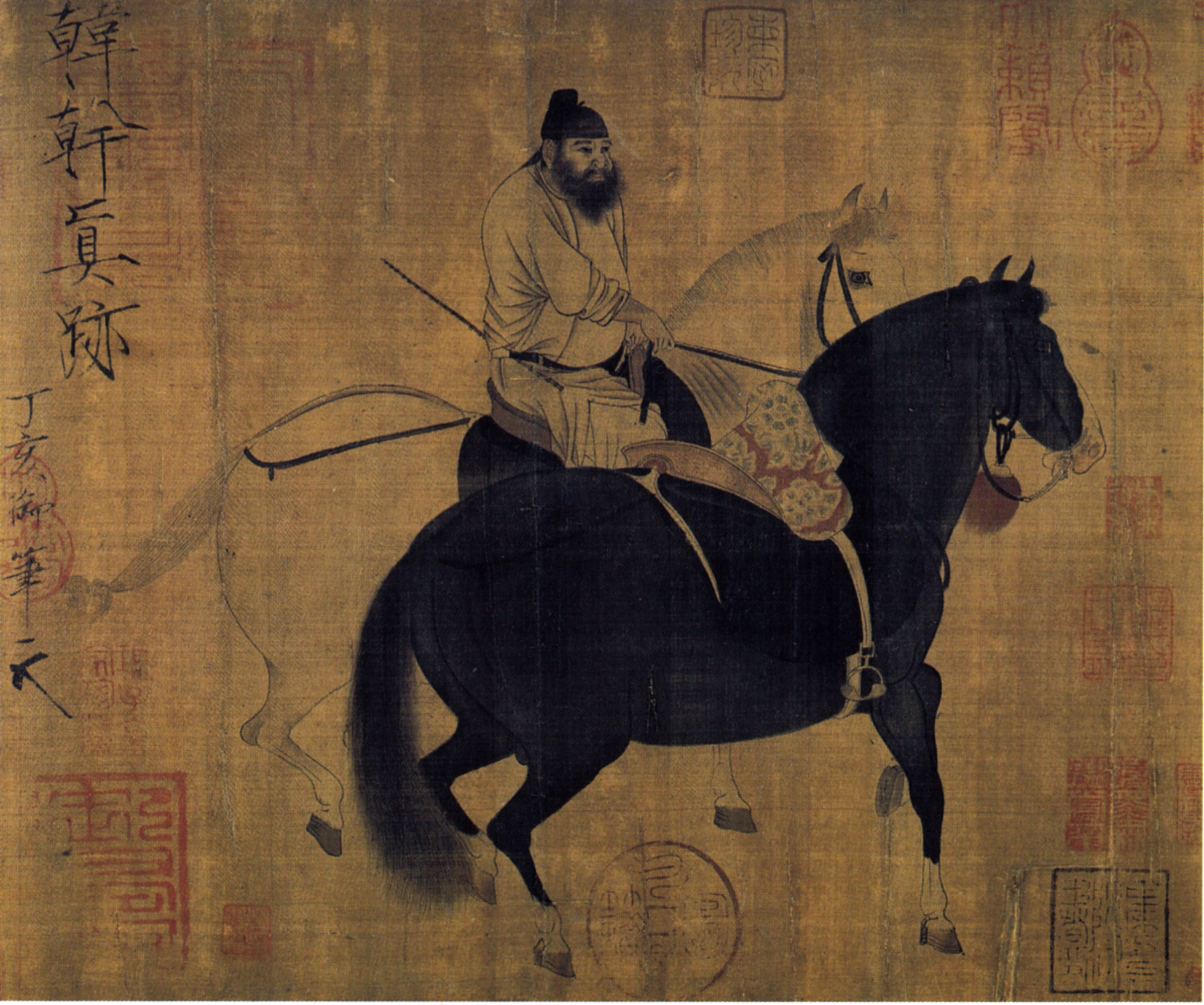
A Man Herding Horses, by Han Gan (706–783 AD)

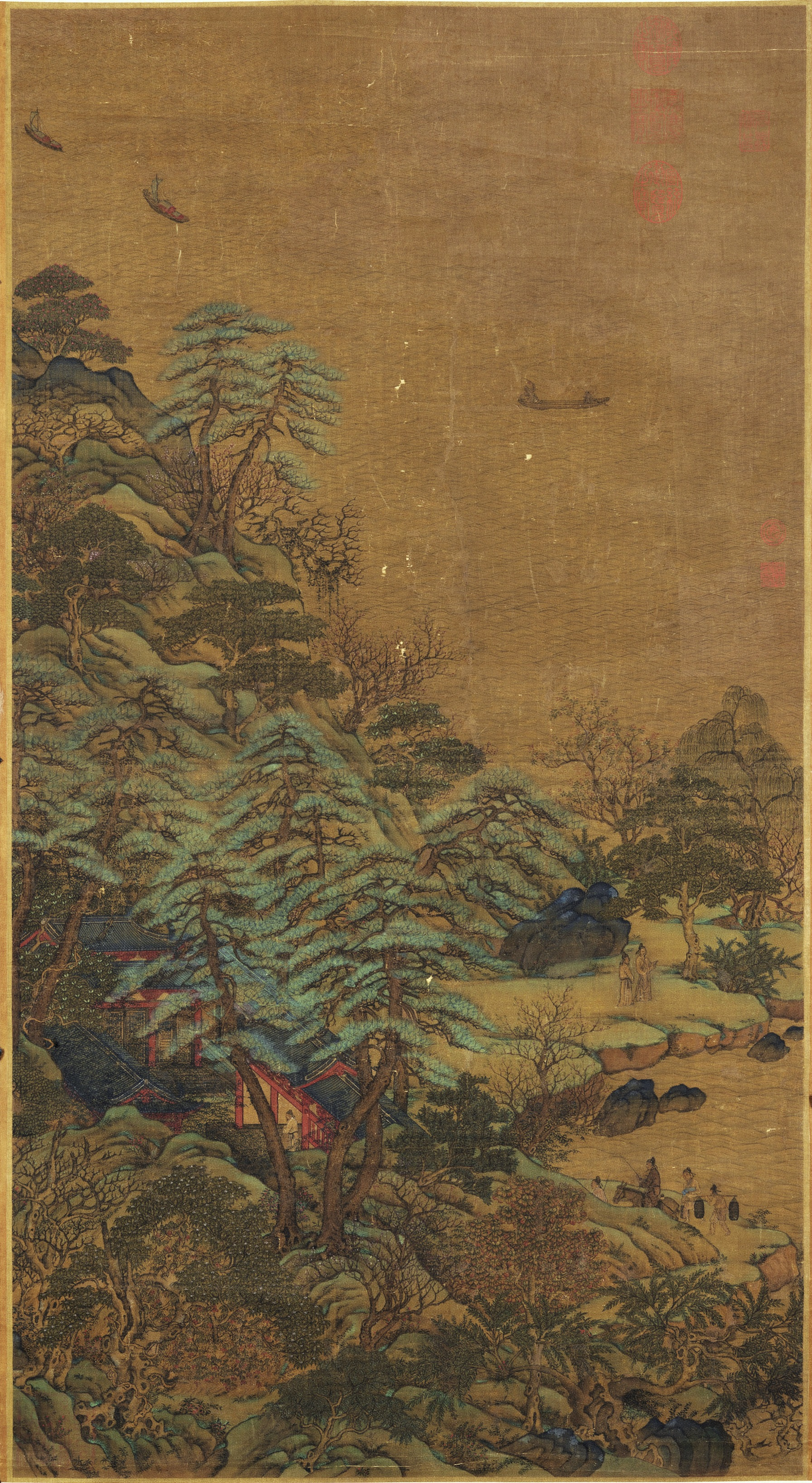
Sailing Boats and a Riverside Mansion, 7th century original by Li Sixun.

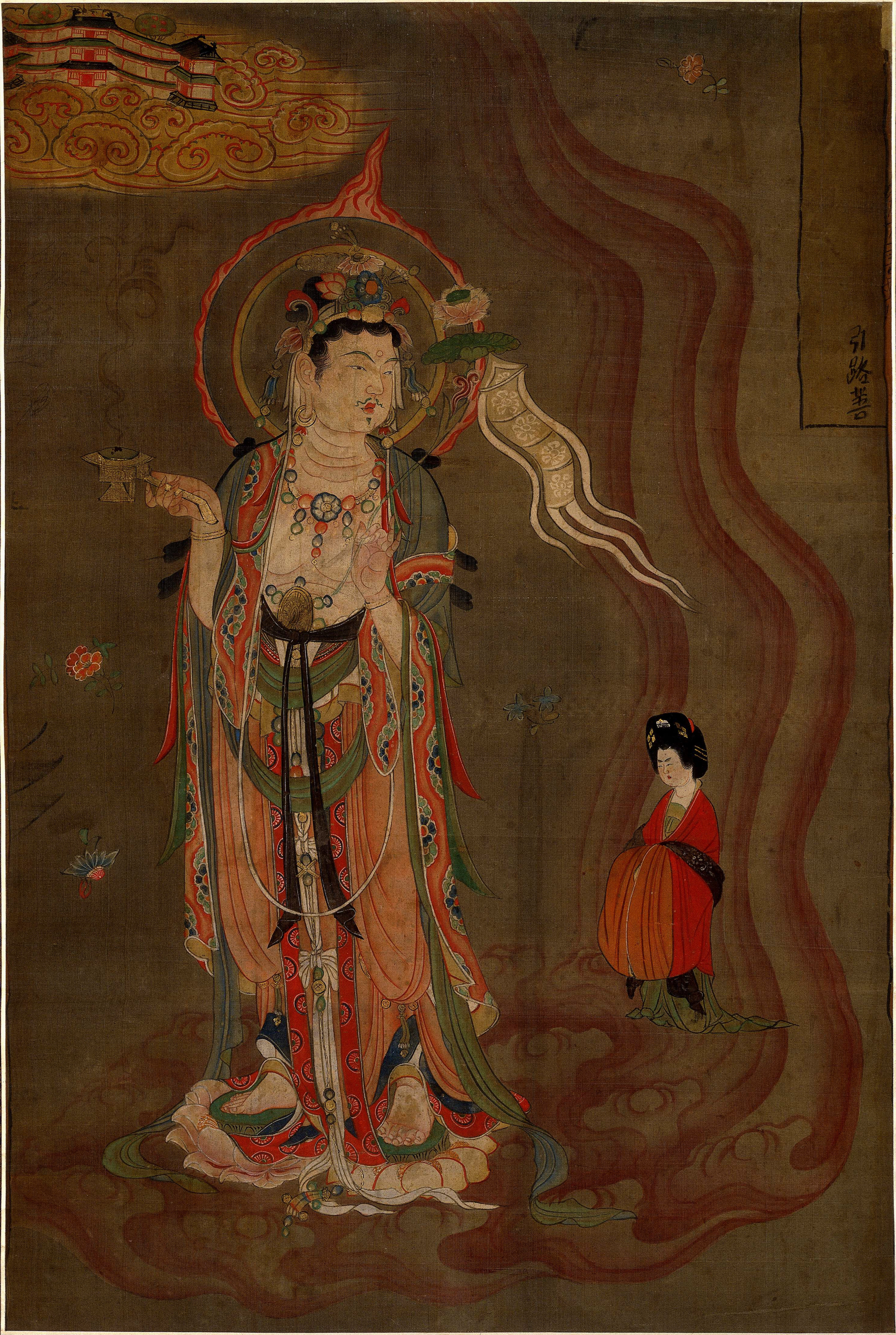
Bodhisattva leading a patroness to the Western Pure Lands. c. 7th century from Dunhuang

During the Tang dynasty, figure painting flourished at the royal court. Artists such as Zhou Fang depicted the splendor of court life in paintings of emperors, palace ladies, and imperial horses. Figure painting reached the height of elegant realism in the art of the court of Southern Tang (937–975).

Most of the Tang artists outlined figures with fine black lines and used brilliant color and elaborate detail. However, one Tang artist, the master Wu Daozi, used only black ink and freely painted brushstrokes to create ink paintings that were so exciting that crowds gathered to watch him work. From his time on, ink paintings were no longer thought to be preliminary sketches or outlines to be filled in with color. Instead, they were valued as finished works of art.

Beginning in the Tang dynasty, many paintings were landscapes, often shanshui (山水, "mountain water") paintings. In these landscapes, monochromatic and sparse (a style that is collectively called shuimohua), the purpose was not to reproduce the appearance of nature exactly (realism) but rather to grasp an emotion or atmosphere, as if catching the "rhythm" of nature.

A considerable amount of literary and documentary information about Tang painting has survived, but very few works, especially of the highest quality. A walled-up cave in the Mogao Caves complex at Dunhuang was discovered by Sir Aurel Stein, which contained a vast haul, mostly of Buddhist writings, but also some banners and paintings, making much the largest group of paintings on silk to survive. These are now in the British Museum and elsewhere. They are not of court quality, but show a variety of styles, including those with influences from further west. As with sculpture, other survivals showing Tang style are in Japan, though the most important, at Nara, was very largely destroyed in a fire in 1949. The rock-cut cave complexes and royal tombs also contain many wall-paintings. Court painting mostly survives in what are certainly or arguably copies from much later.

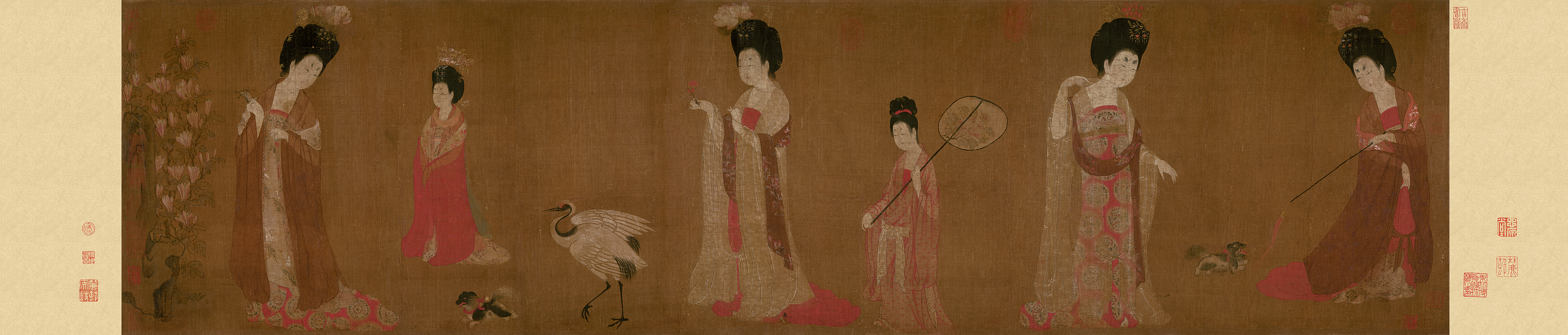
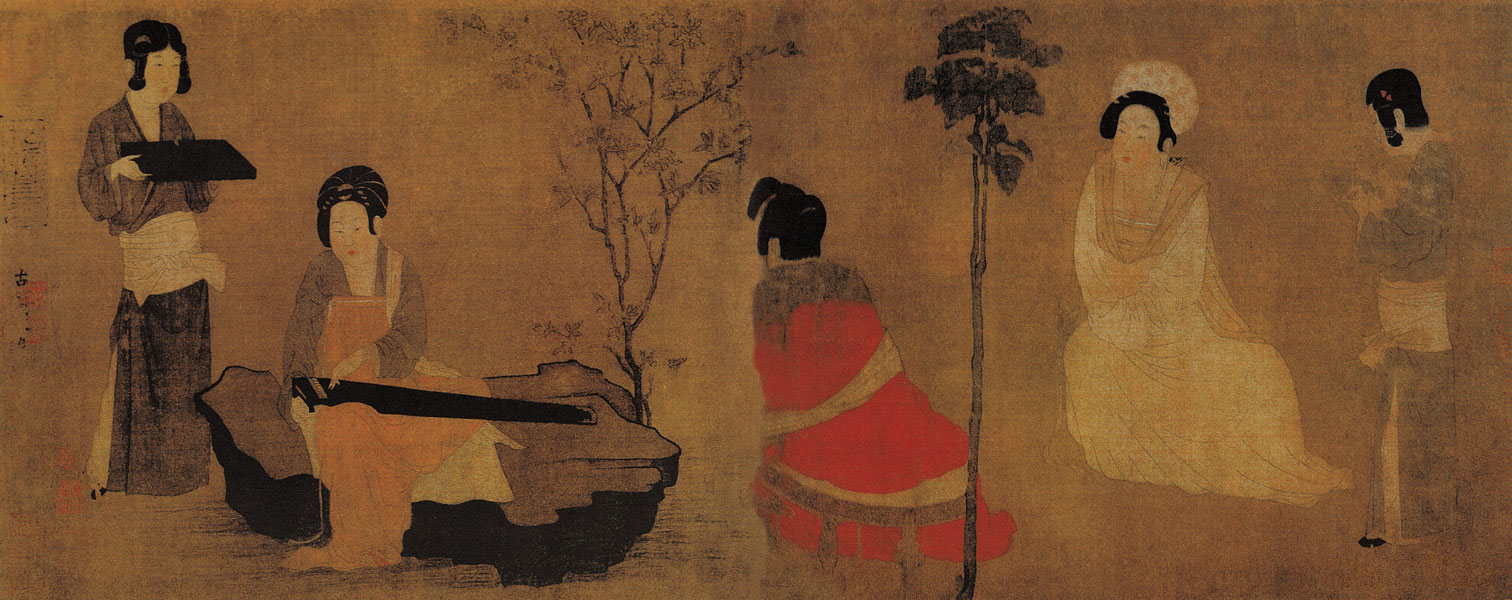
Zhou Fang (c.730–800) is renowned for his paintings of contemporary court ladies, whose opulent figures reflected the beauty standards of the day.
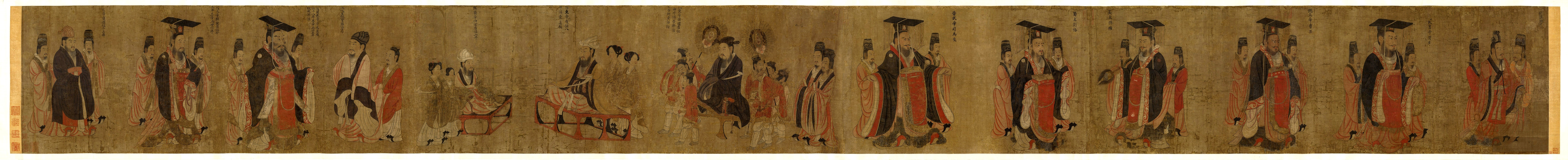
Yan Liben's Thirteen Emperors; original, 7th century AD
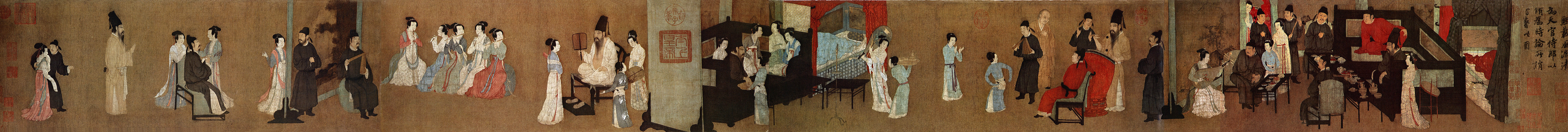
Full scroll of The Night Revels of Han Xizai, first painted in the 10th century in Southern Tang, later reproduced in 12th-century

== Song, Liao, Jin and Yuan dynasties (907–1368) ==
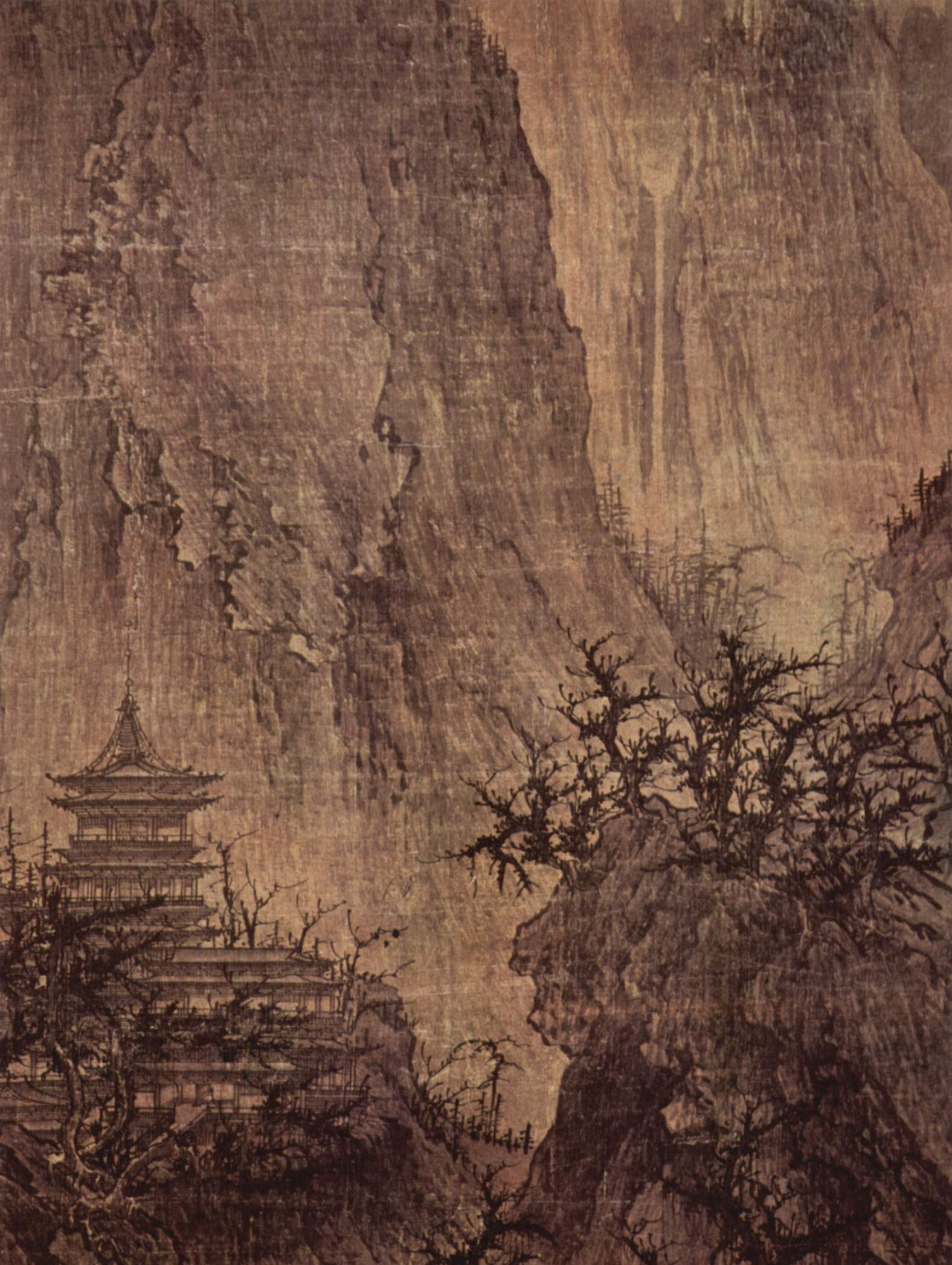
Buddhist Temple in the Mountains, 11th century, ink on silk, Nelson-Atkins Museum of Art, Kansas City (Missouri).

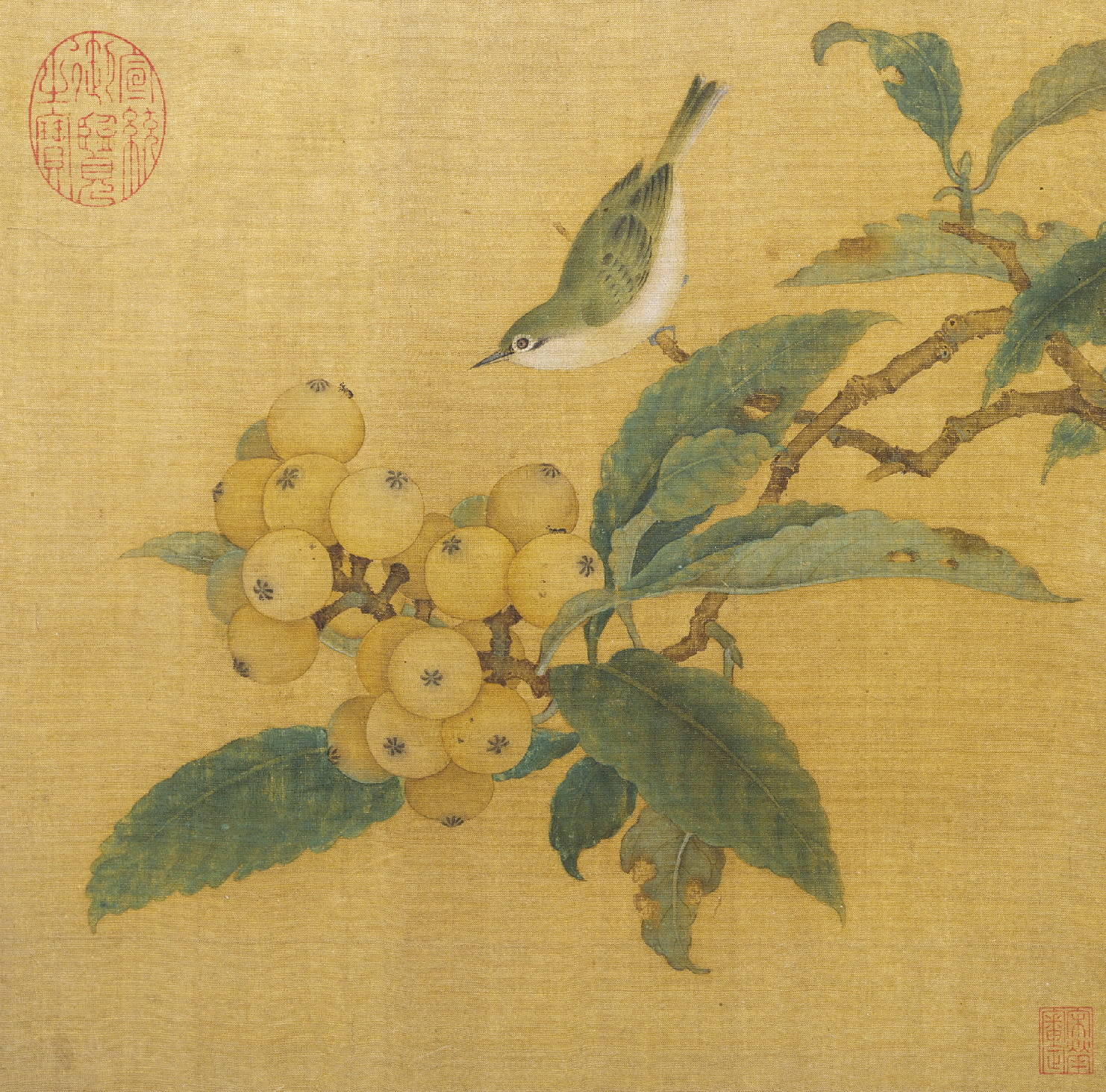
Loquats and a Mountain Bird, by an anonymous painter of the Southern Song dynasty (1127–1279); albums of small leaf paintings like this were popular amongst the gentry and scholar-officials of the Southern Song.

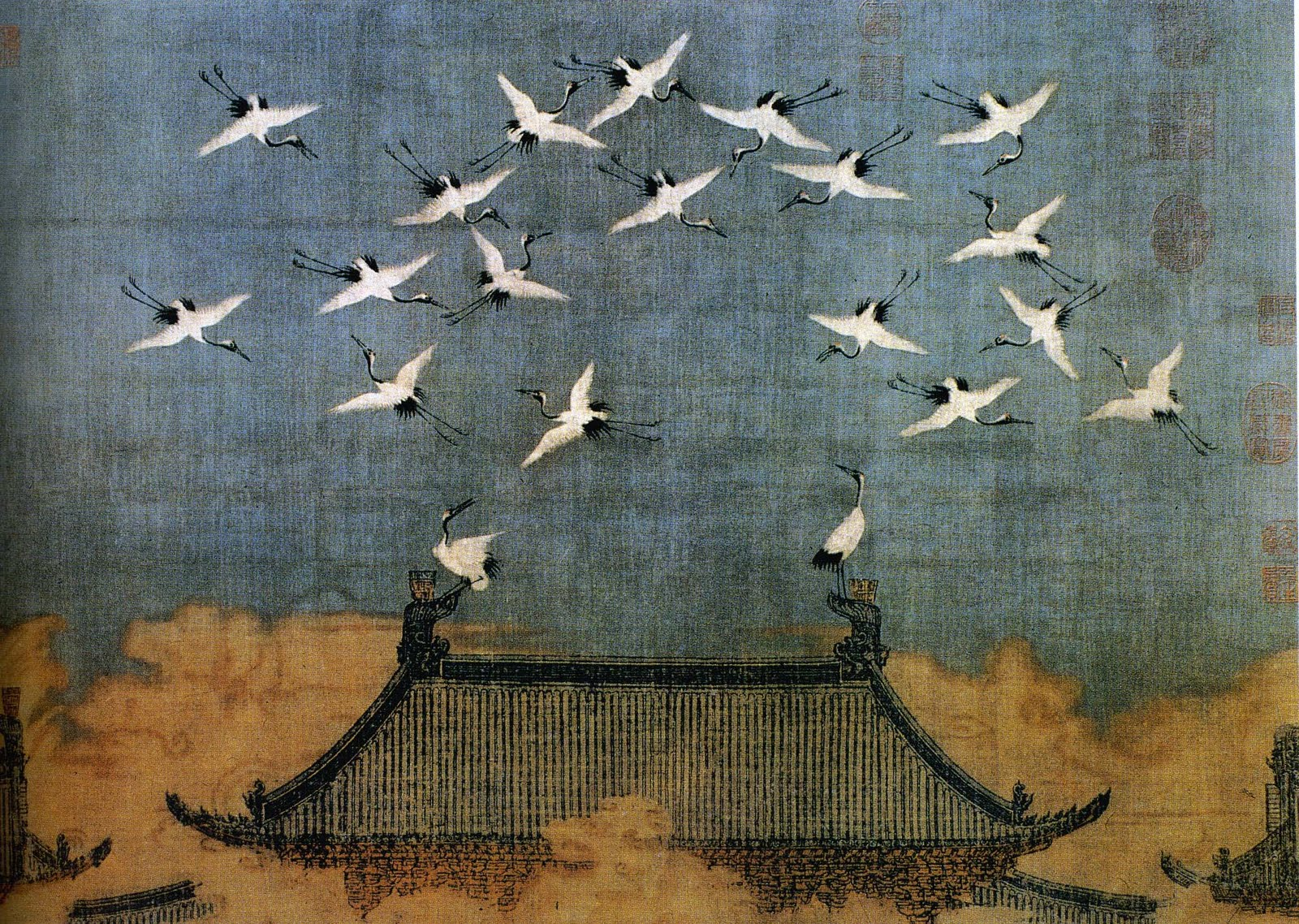
Auspicious Cranes, by Emperor Huizong depicting a scene on top of Kaifeng city gate on 16th January 1112.

Painting during the Song dynasty (960–1279) reached a further development of landscape painting; immeasurable distances were conveyed through the use of blurred outlines, mountain contours disappearing into the mist, and impressionistic treatment of natural phenomena. The shan shui style painting—"shan" meaning mountain, and "shui" meaning river—became prominent in Chinese landscape art. The emphasis laid upon landscape was grounded in Chinese philosophy; Taoism stressed that humans were but tiny specks in the vast and greater cosmos, while Neo-Confucianist writers often pursued the discovery of patterns and principles that they believed caused all social and natural phenomena. The painting of portraits and closely viewed objects like birds on branches were held in high esteem, but landscape painting was paramount. By the beginning of the Song dynasty a distinctive landscape style had emerged. Artists mastered the formula of intricate and realistic scenes placed in the foreground, while the background retained qualities of vast and infinite space. Distant mountain peaks rise out of high clouds and mist, while streaming rivers run from afar into the foreground.

There was a significant difference in painting trends between the Northern Song period (960–1127) and Southern Song period (1127–1279). The paintings of Northern Song officials were influenced by their political ideals of bringing order to the world and tackling the largest issues affecting the whole of society; their paintings often depicted huge, sweeping landscapes. During the Northern Song, landscape paintings had political significance and were used by the court to emphasize its strength and authority with the symbolism of grand landscapes. The Northern Song court commissioned enormous landscapes which it used in support of its rites.

Southern Song officials were more interested in reforming society from the bottom up and on a much smaller scale, a method they believed had a better chance for eventual success; their paintings often focused on smaller, visually closer, and more intimate scenes, while the background was often depicted as bereft of detail as a realm without concern for the artist or viewer. This change in attitude from one era to the next stemmed largely from the rising influence of Neo-Confucian philosophy. Adherents to Neo-Confucianism focused on reforming society from the bottom up, not the top down, which can be seen in their efforts to promote small private academies during the Southern Song instead of the large state-controlled academies seen in the Northern Song era.

Ever since the Southern and Northern dynasties (420–589), painting had become an art of high sophistication that was associated with the gentry class as one of their main artistic pastimes, the others being calligraphy and poetry. During the Song dynasty there were avid art collectors that would often meet in groups to discuss their own paintings, as well as rate those of their colleagues and friends. The poet and statesman Su Shi (1037–1101) and his accomplice Mi Fu (1051–1107) often partook in these affairs, borrowing art pieces to study and copy, or if they really admired a piece then an exchange was often proposed. They created a new kind of art based upon the three perfections in which they used their skills in calligraphy (the art of beautiful writing) to make ink paintings. From their time onward, many painters strove to freely express their feelings and to capture the inner spirit of their subject instead of describing its outward appearance. The small round paintings popular in the Southern Song were often collected into albums as poets would write poems along the side to match the theme and mood of the painting.

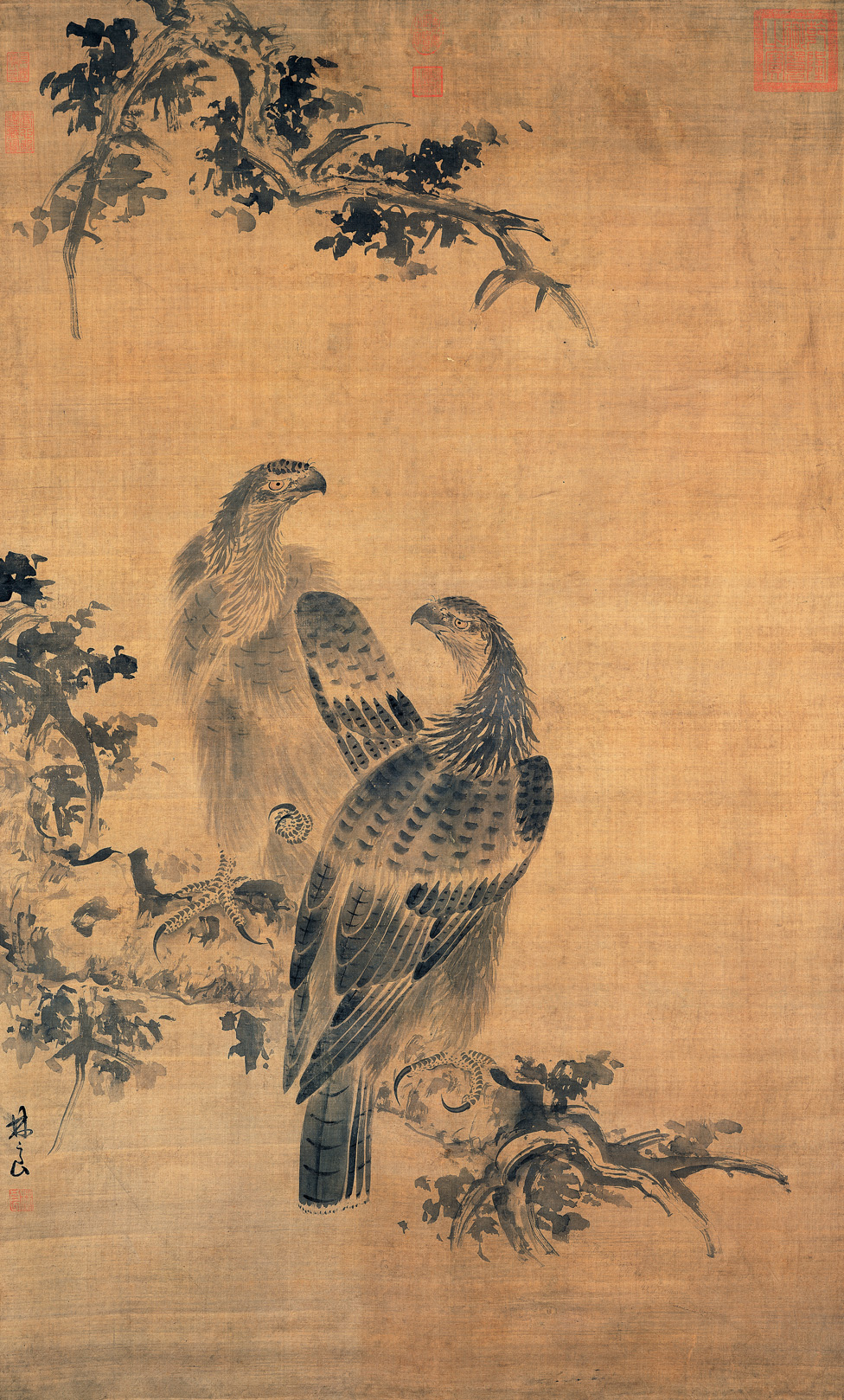
Eagles, by Lin Liang (1424–1500). The prolific gongbi paintings by Emperor Huizong had a profound impact on many contemporaries and beyond.

Although they were avid art collectors, some Song scholars did not readily appreciate artworks commissioned by those painters found at shops or common marketplaces, and some of the scholars even criticized artists from renowned schools and academies. Anthony J. Barbieri-Low, a professor of early Chinese history at the University of California, Santa Barbara, points out that Song scholars' appreciation of art created by their peers was not extended to those who made a living simply as professional artists:

During the Northern Song (960–1126 CE), a new class of scholar-artists emerged who did not possess the tromp l'œil skills of the academy painters nor even the proficiency of common marketplace painters. The literati's painting was simpler and at times quite unschooled, yet they would criticize these other two groups as mere professionals, since they relied on paid commissions for their livelihood and did not paint merely for enjoyment or self-expression. The scholar-artists considered that painters who concentrated on realistic depictions, who employed a colorful palette, or, worst of all, who accepted monetary payment for their work were no better than butchers or tinkers in the marketplace. They were not to be considered real artists.

However, during the Song period, there were many acclaimed court painters and they were highly esteemed by emperors and the royal family. One of the greatest landscape painters given patronage by the Song court was Zhang Zeduan (1085–1145), who painted the original Along the River During the Qingming Festival scroll, one of the most well-known masterpieces of Chinese visual art. Emperor Gaozong of Song (1127–1162) once commissioned an art project of numerous paintings for the Eighteen Songs of a Nomad Flute, based on the woman poet Cai Wenji (177–250 AD) of the earlier Han dynasty. Yi Yuanji achieved a high degree of realism painting animals, in particular monkeys and gibbons. During the Southern Song period (1127–1279), court painters such as Ma Yuan and Xia Gui used strong black brushstrokes to sketch trees and rocks and pale washes to suggest misty space.

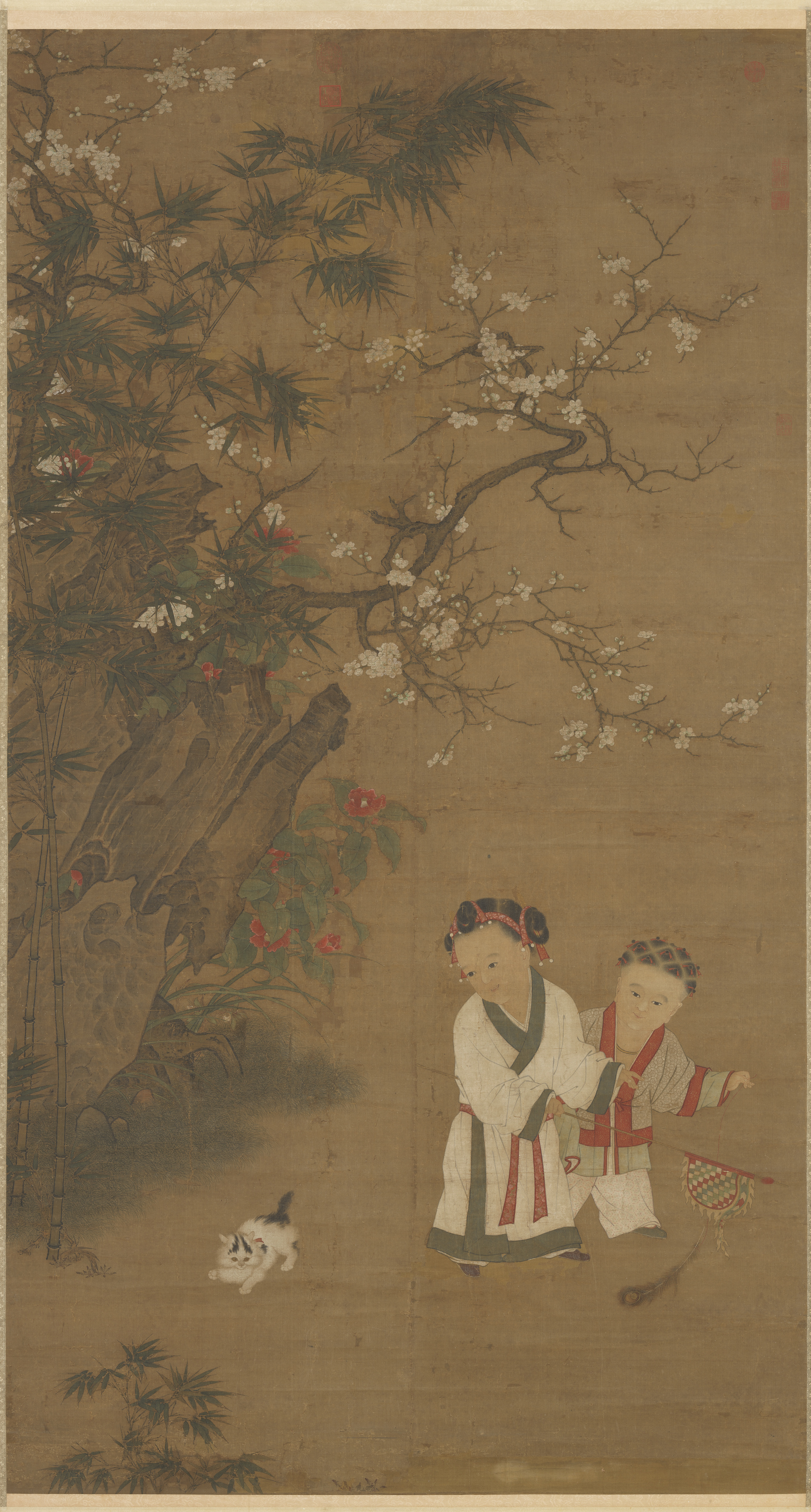
Children Playing on a Winter Day by Su Hanchen(1094–1172); depictions of common life became a popular motif during the prosperous years of the Song Dynasty

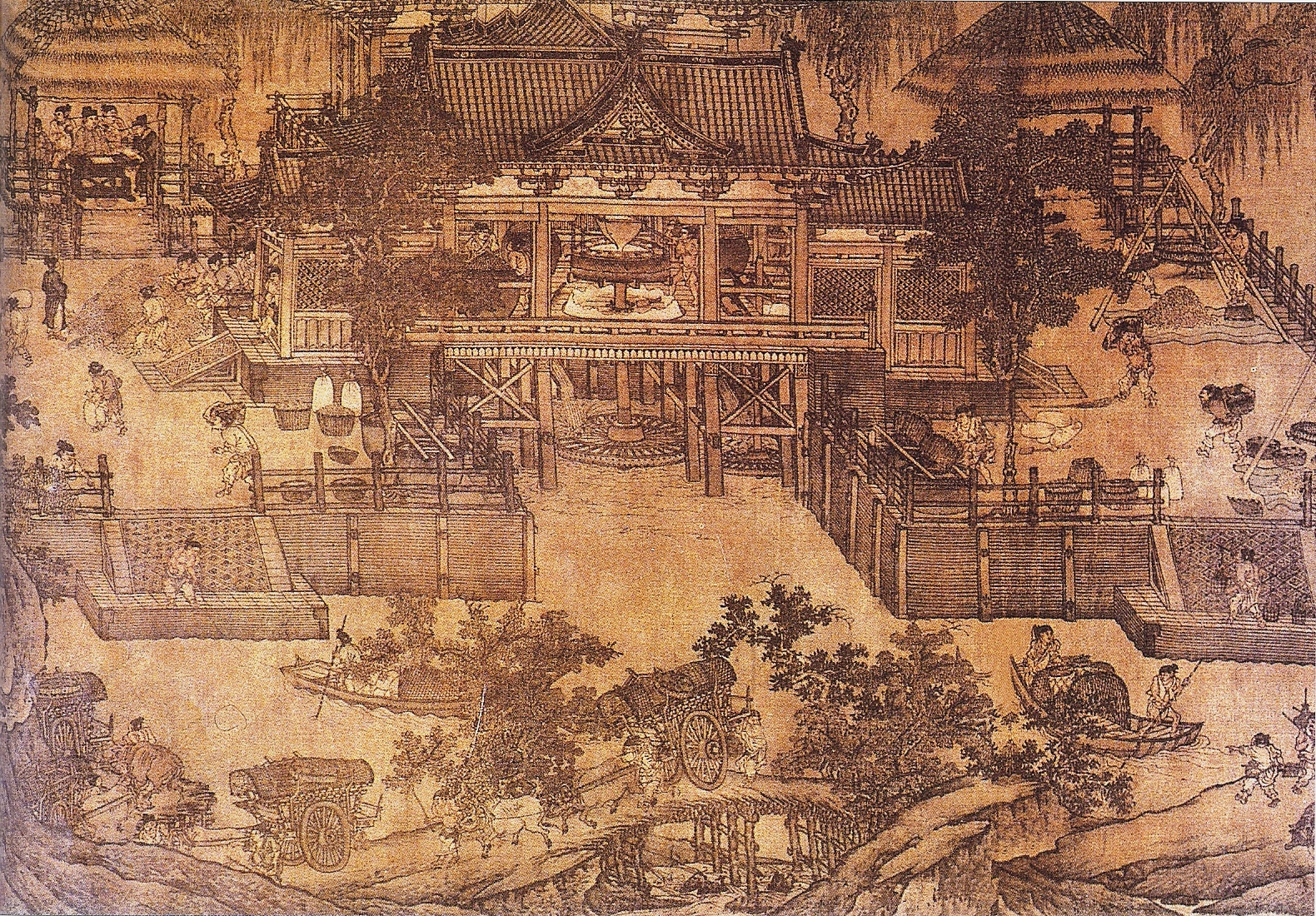
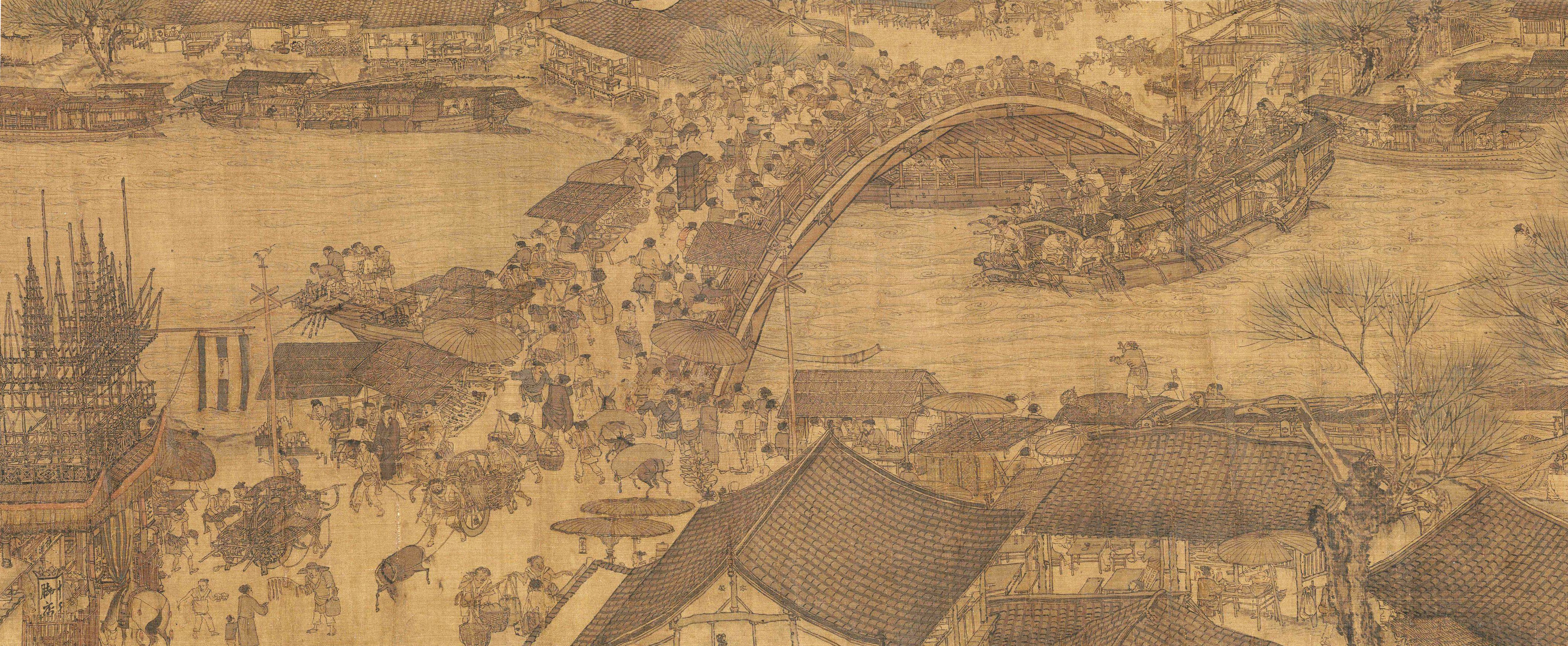
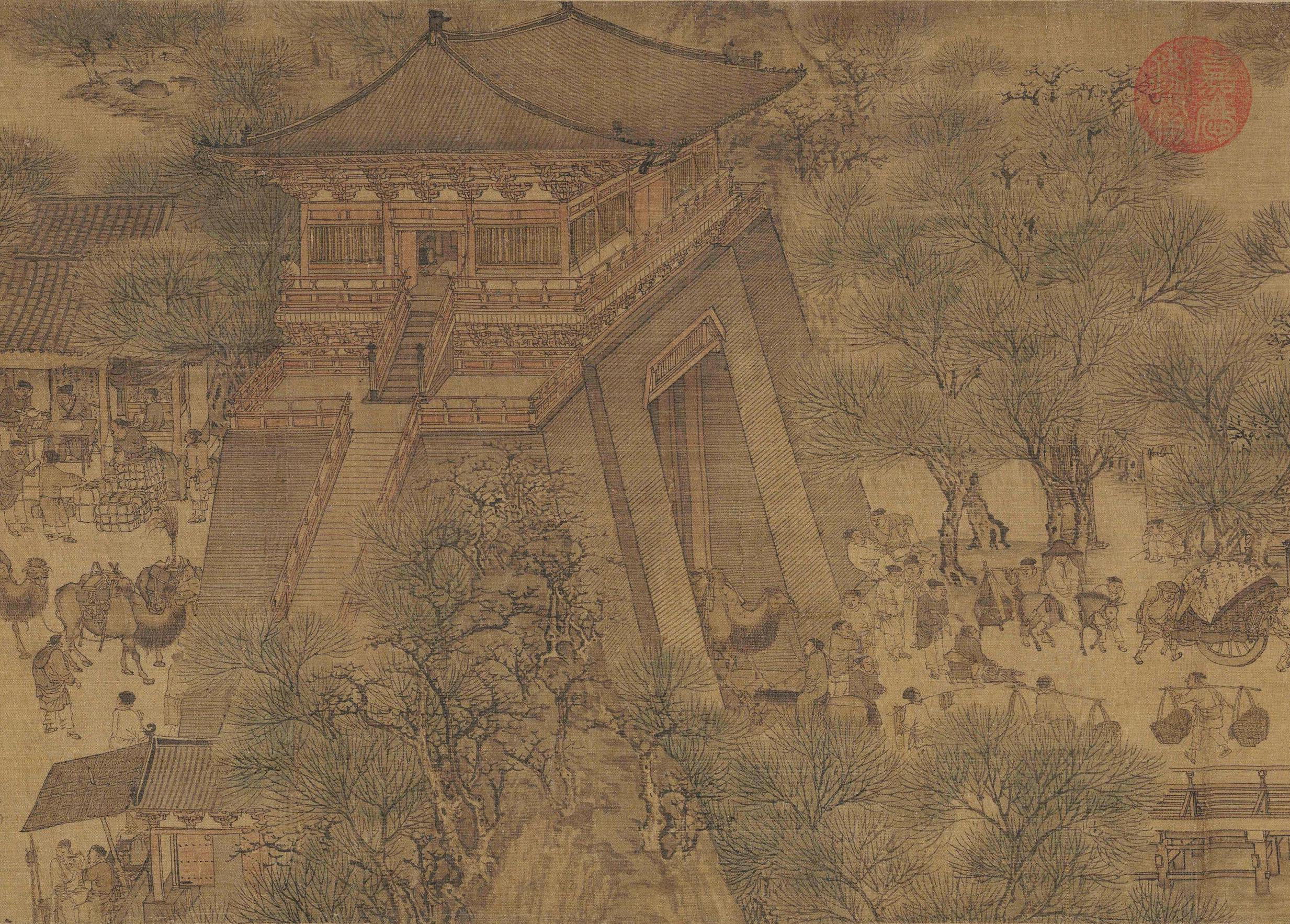
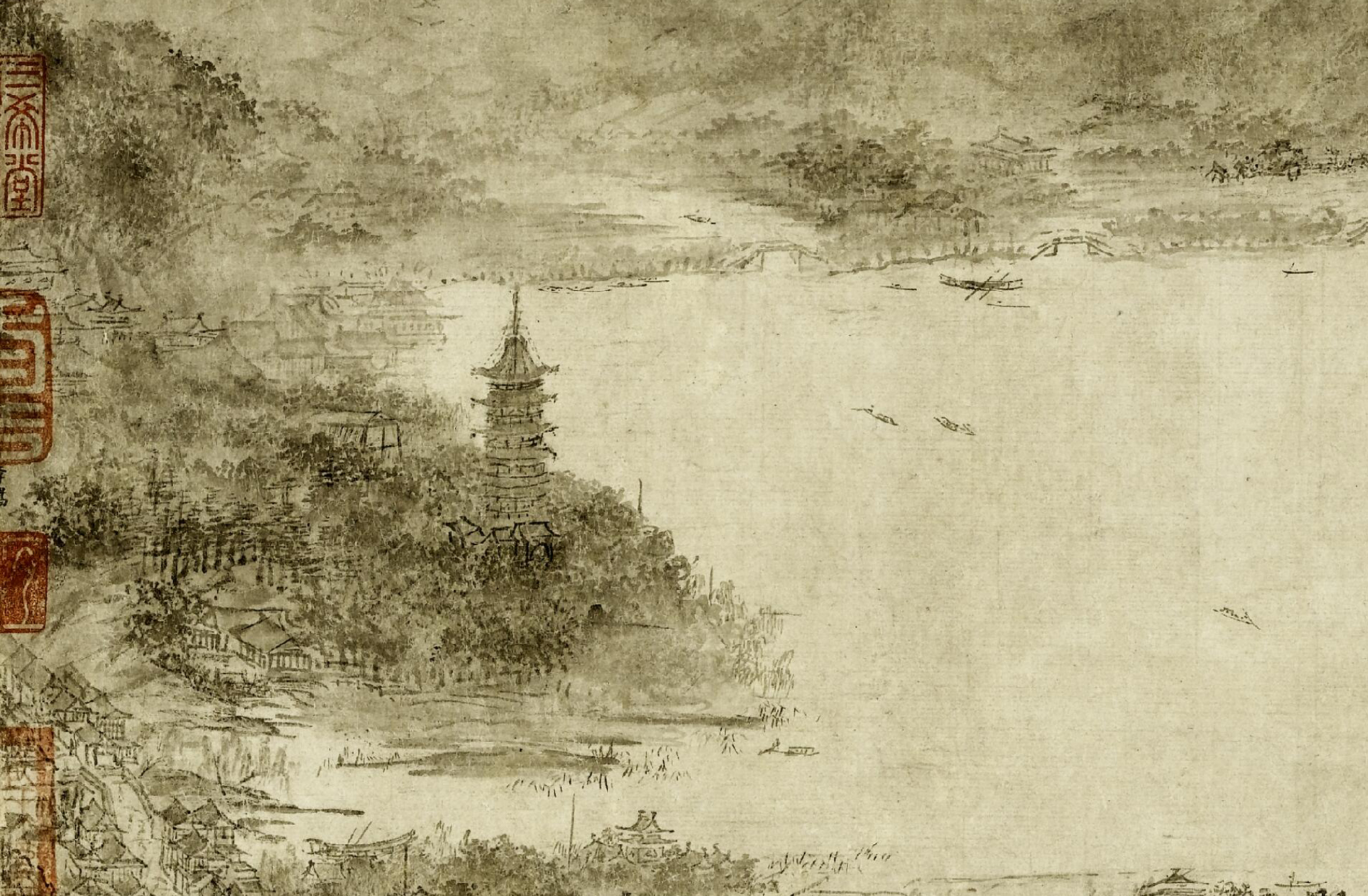
Various scenes from Along the River During Qingming Festival

During the Mongol Yuan dynasty (1271–1368), painters joined the arts of painting, poetry, and calligraphy by inscribing poems on their paintings. These three arts worked together to express the artist's feelings more completely than one art could do alone. Yuan emperor Tugh Temur (r. 1328, 1329–1332) was fond of Chinese painting and became a creditable painter himself.

The Chinese are of all peoples the most skilful in crafts and attain the greatest perfection in them. This is well known and people have described it and spoken at length about it. No one, whether Greek or any other, rivals them in mastery of painting. They have prodigious facility in it. One of the remarkable things I saw in this connection is that if I visited one of their cities, and then came back to it, I always saw portraits of me and my companions painted on the walls and on paper in the bazaars. I went to the Sultan's city, passed through the painters' bazaar, and went to the Sultan's palace with my companions. We were dressed as Iraqis. When I returned from the palace in the evening I passed through the said bazaar. I saw my and my companions' portraits painted on paper and hung on the walls. We each one of us looked at the portrait of his companion; the resemblance was correct in all respects. I was told the Sultan had ordered them to do this, and that they had come to the palace while we were there and had begun observing and painting us without our being aware of it. It is their custom to paint everyone who comes among them.

— Ibn Battuta

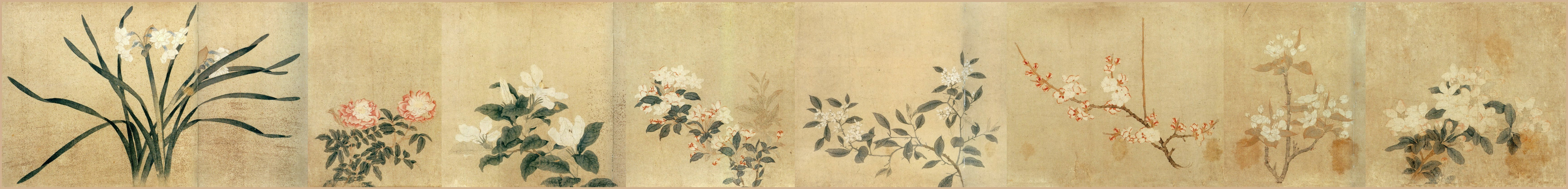
Qian Xuan's Eight Flowers, 13th century.
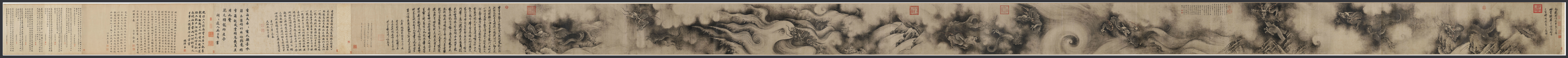
Nine Dragons (painting) by Chen Rong (c.1200–1266)
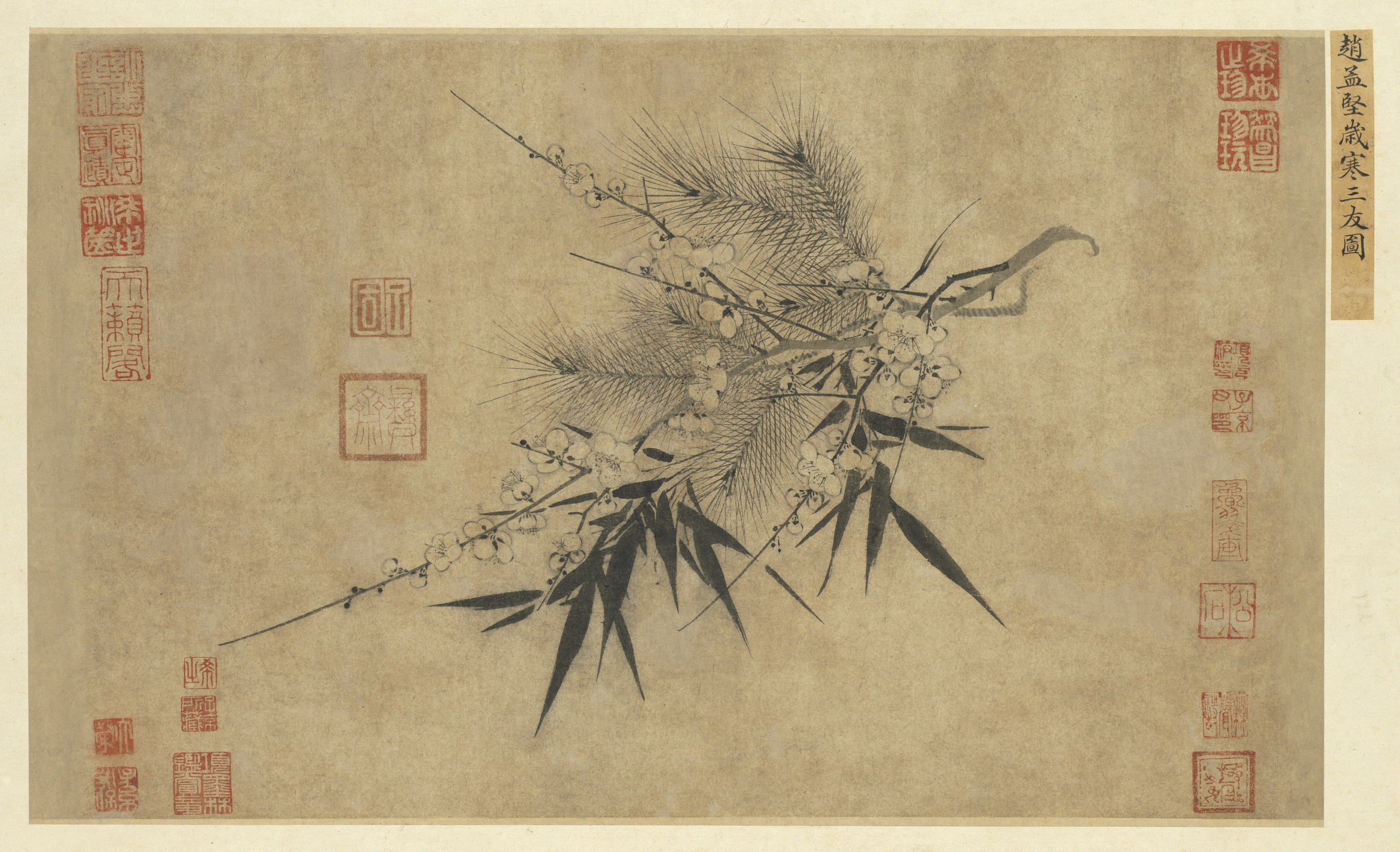
Three Friends of Winter depicting plum, pine and bamboo, still used for decoration during new year's by countries in the sinosphere

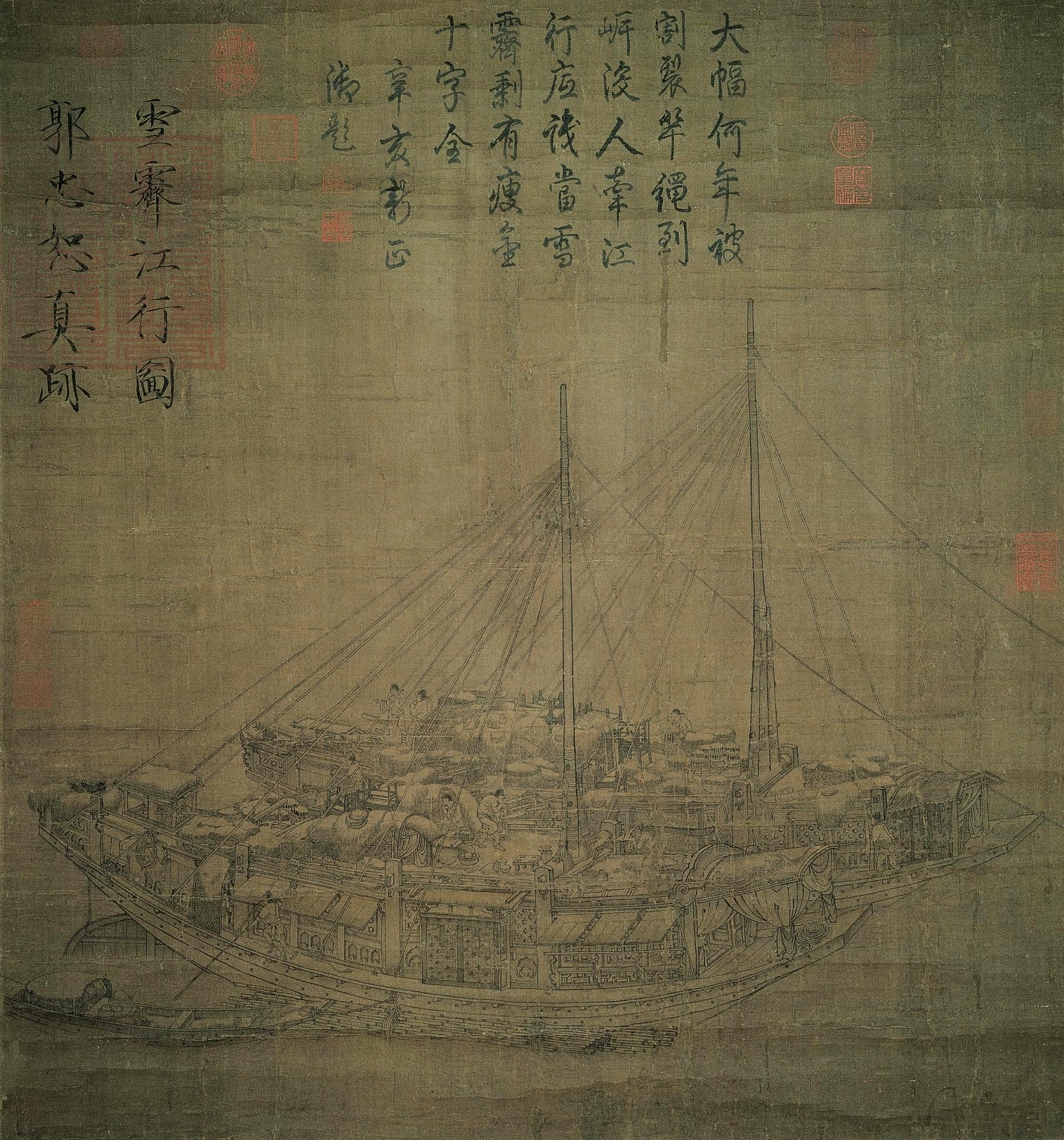
Traveling on the River in Snow. Extremely intricate details give historians insight into medieval Chinese shipbuilding.

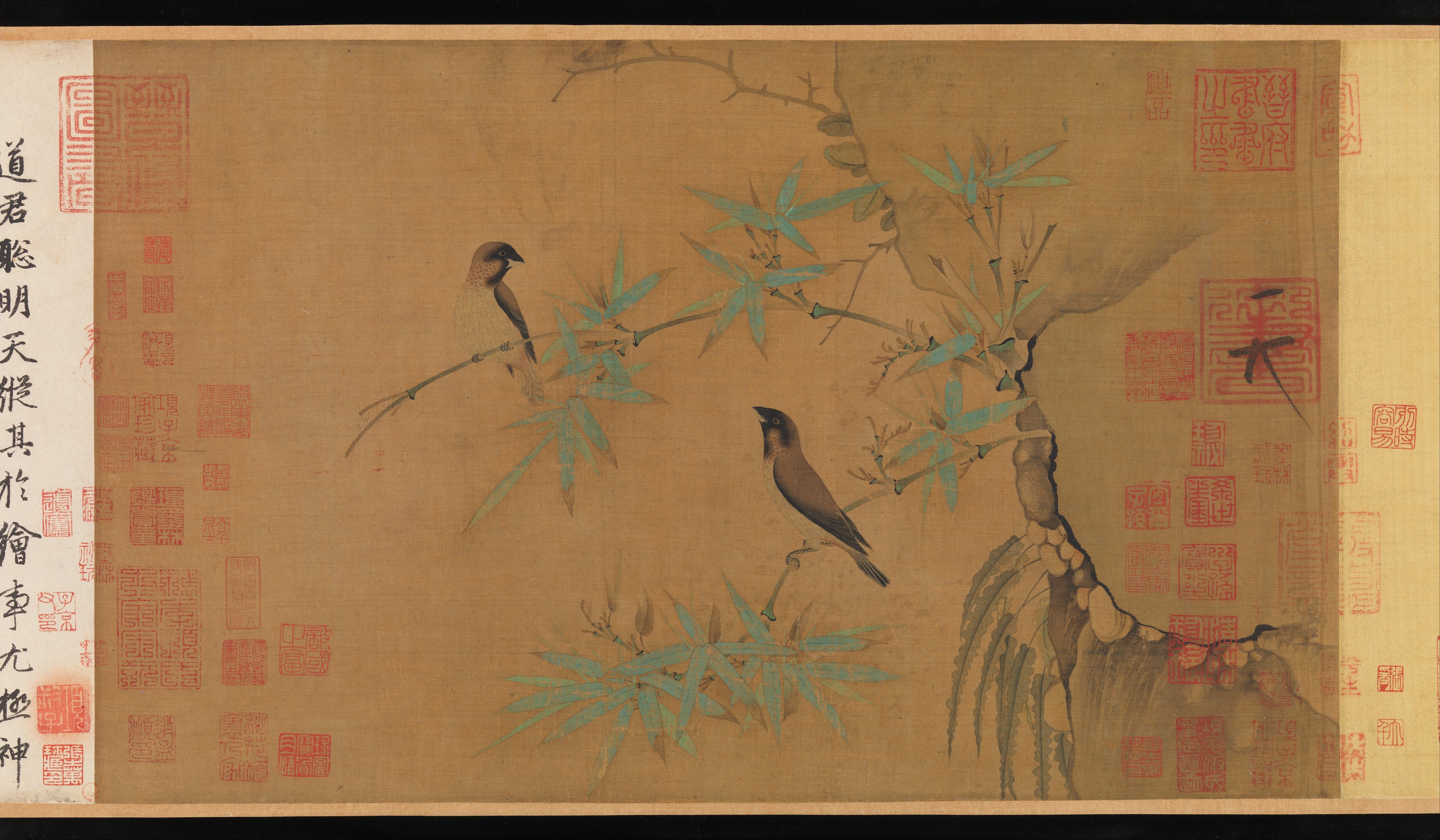
Emperor Huizong of Song was a prolific painter

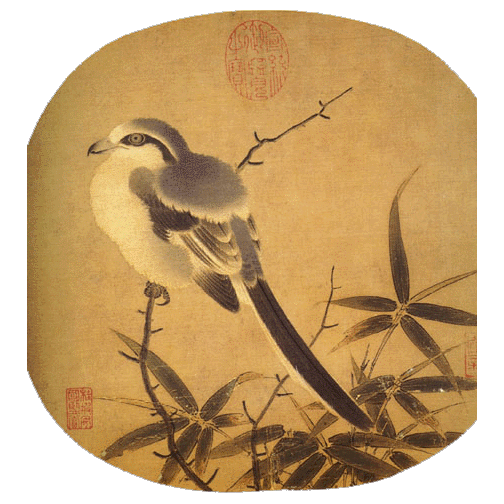
Li Anzhong's Bird on a Branch; it has a circular shape because this was initially painted for a circular fan.

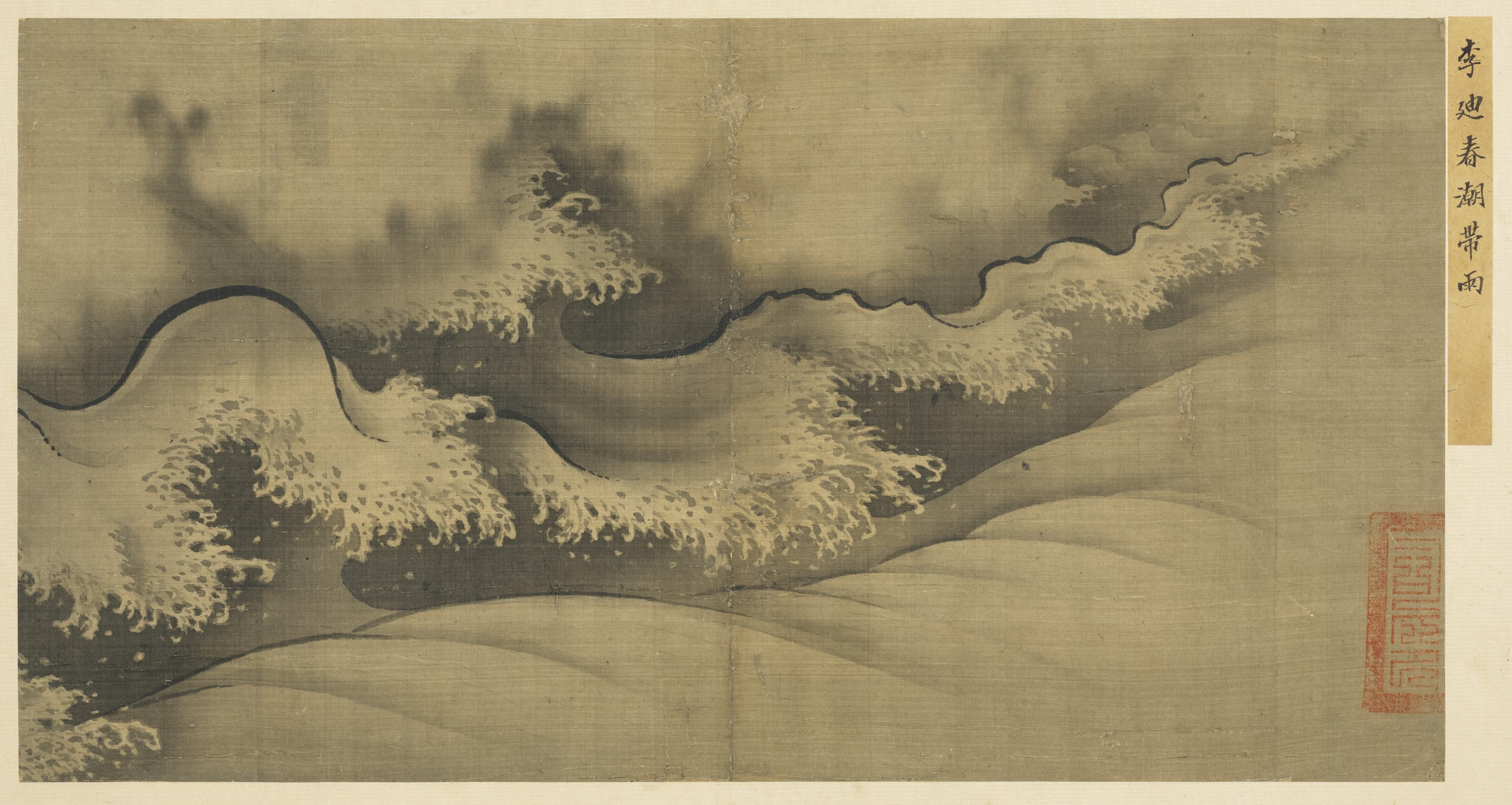
The Spring Tide Brings Rain by Li Di

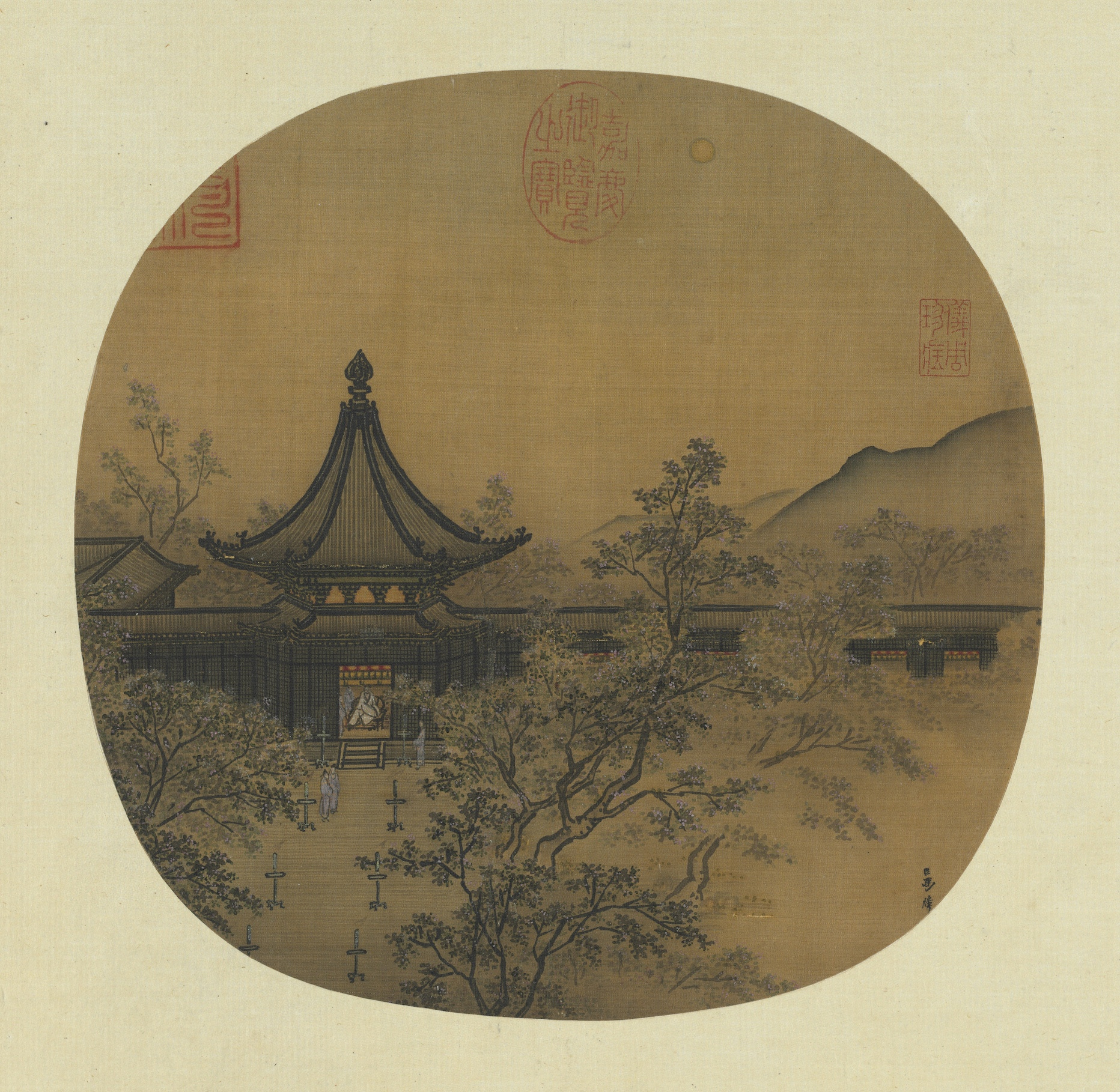
Circular-fan painting by Ma Lin

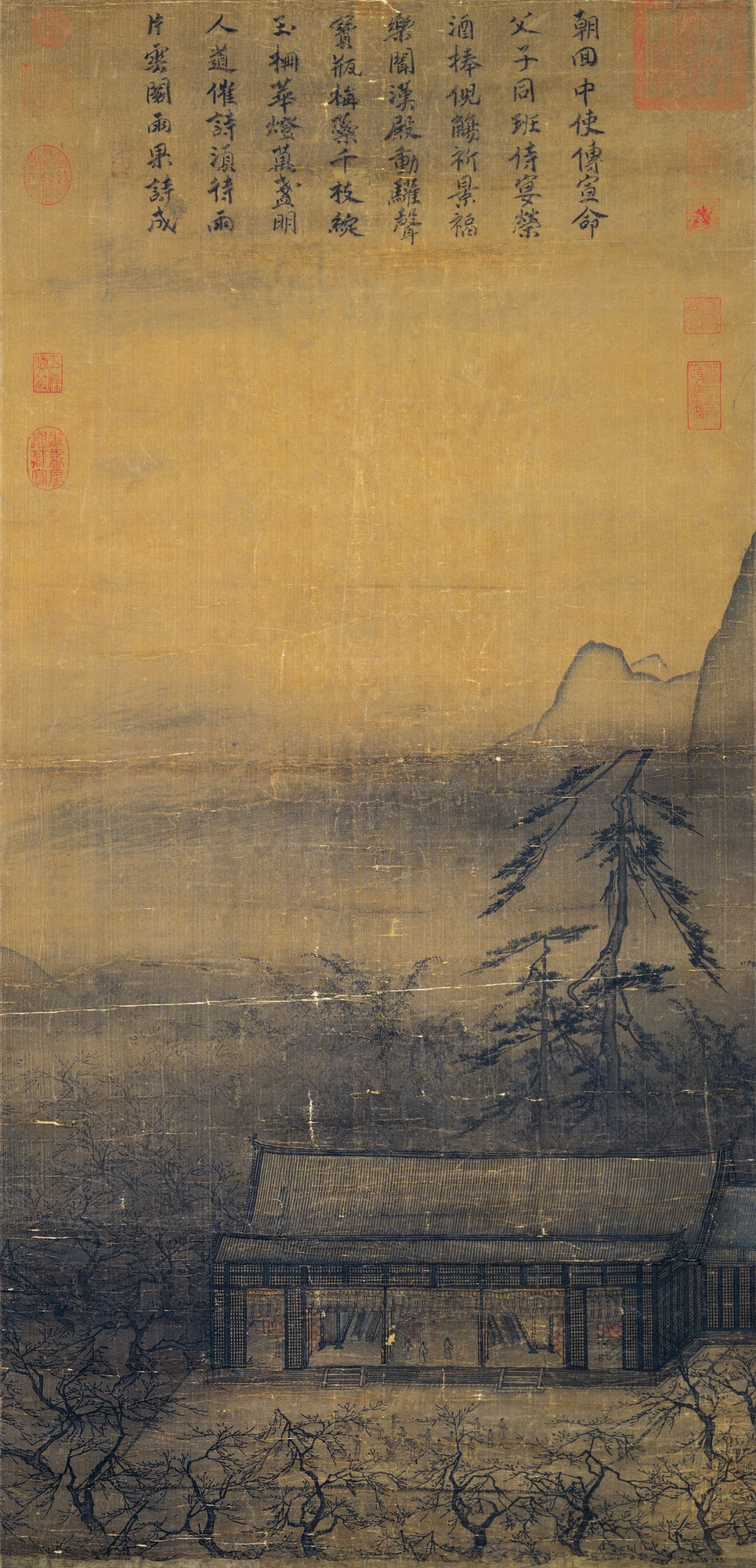
Ma Yuan's Banquet by the Lanterns

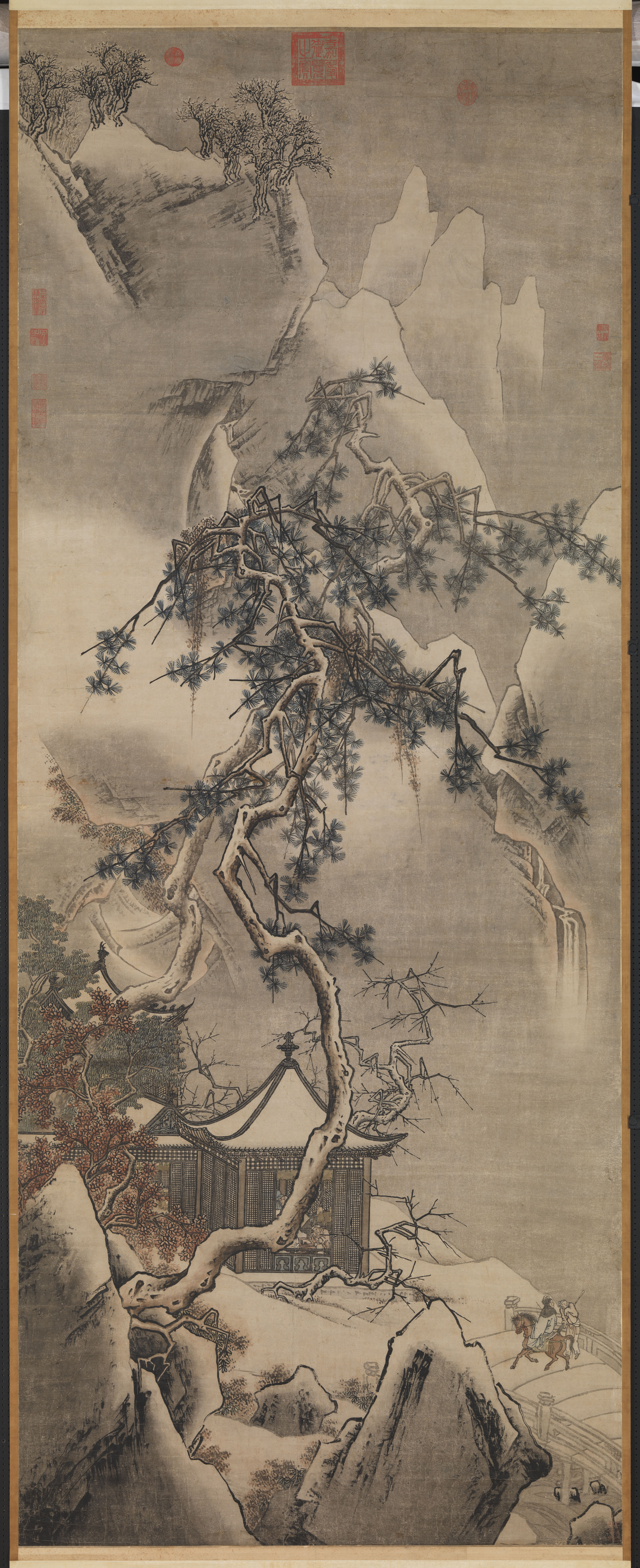
Snowscape by Ma Yuan

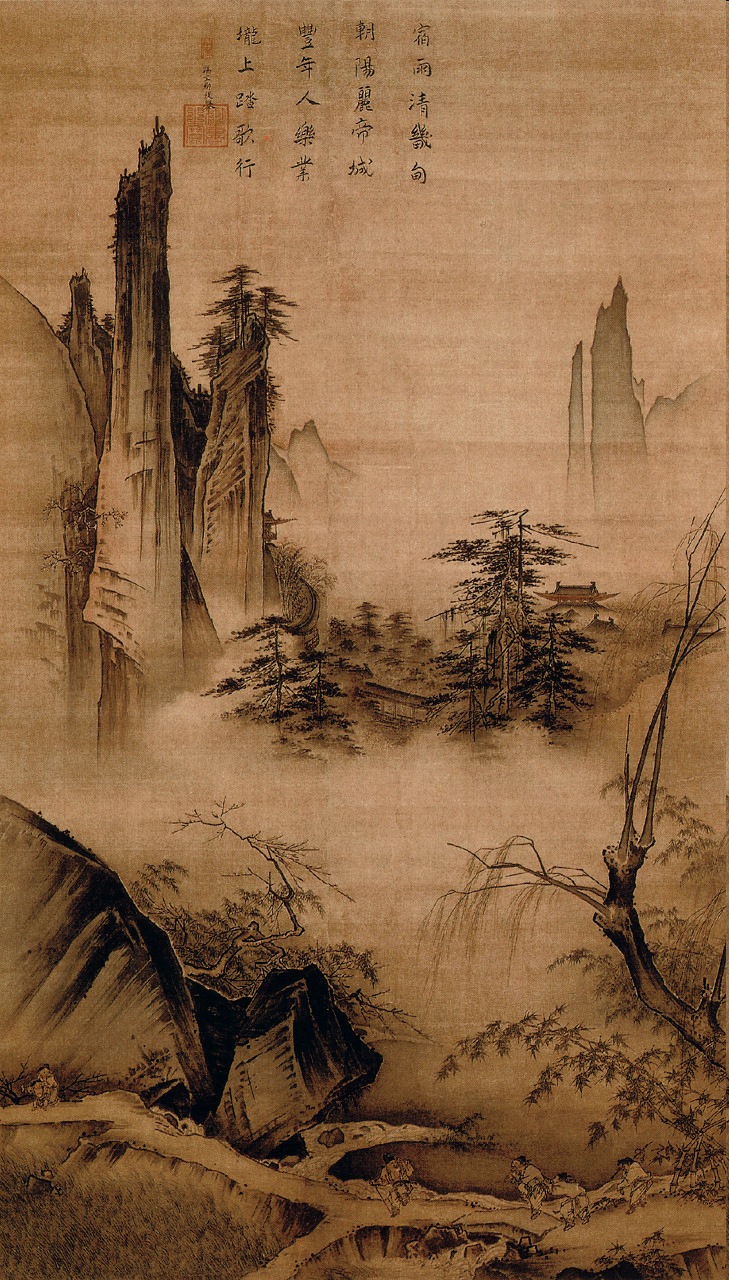
Dancing and Singing Peasants Returning from Work

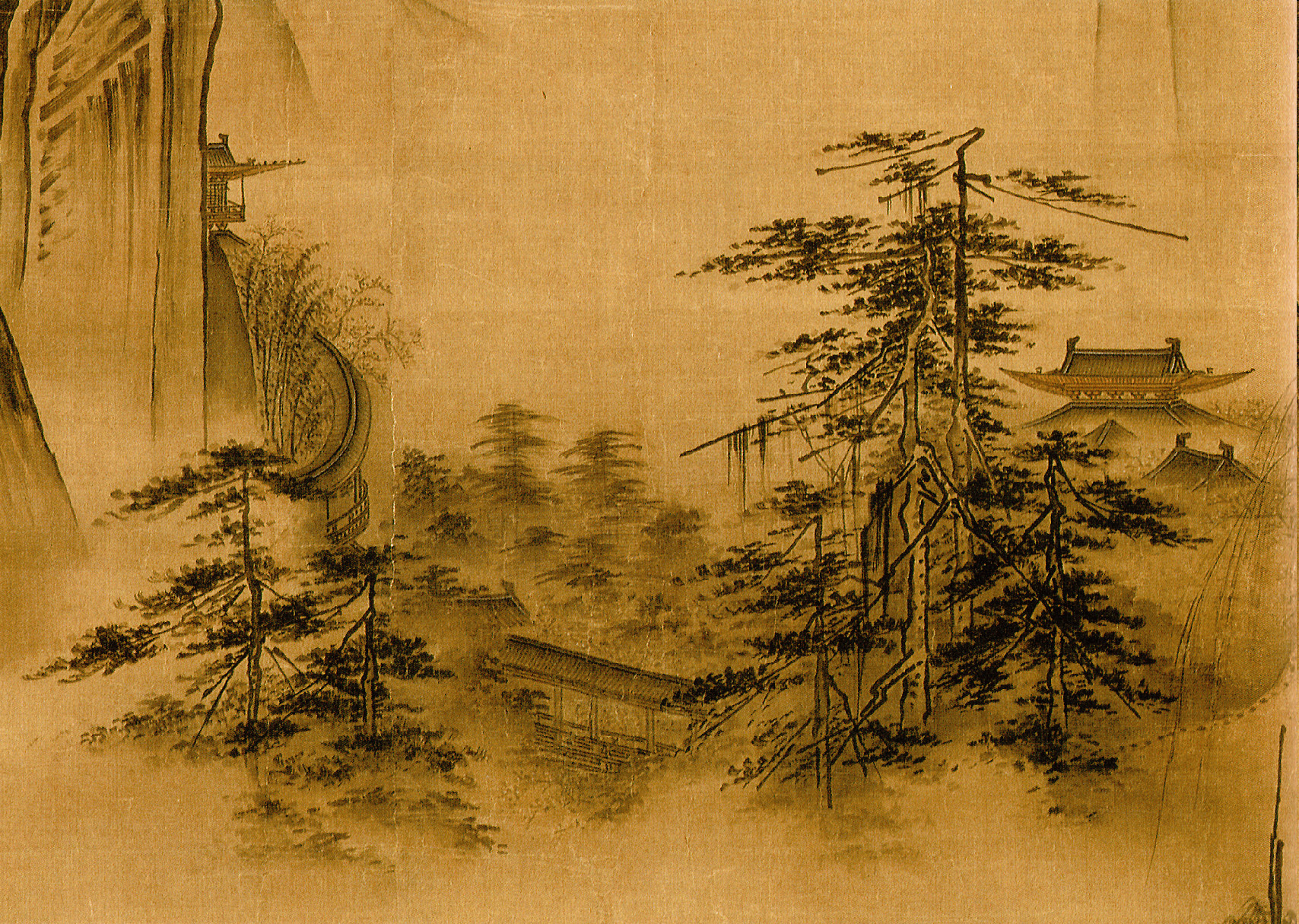
Architectural details of the previous work

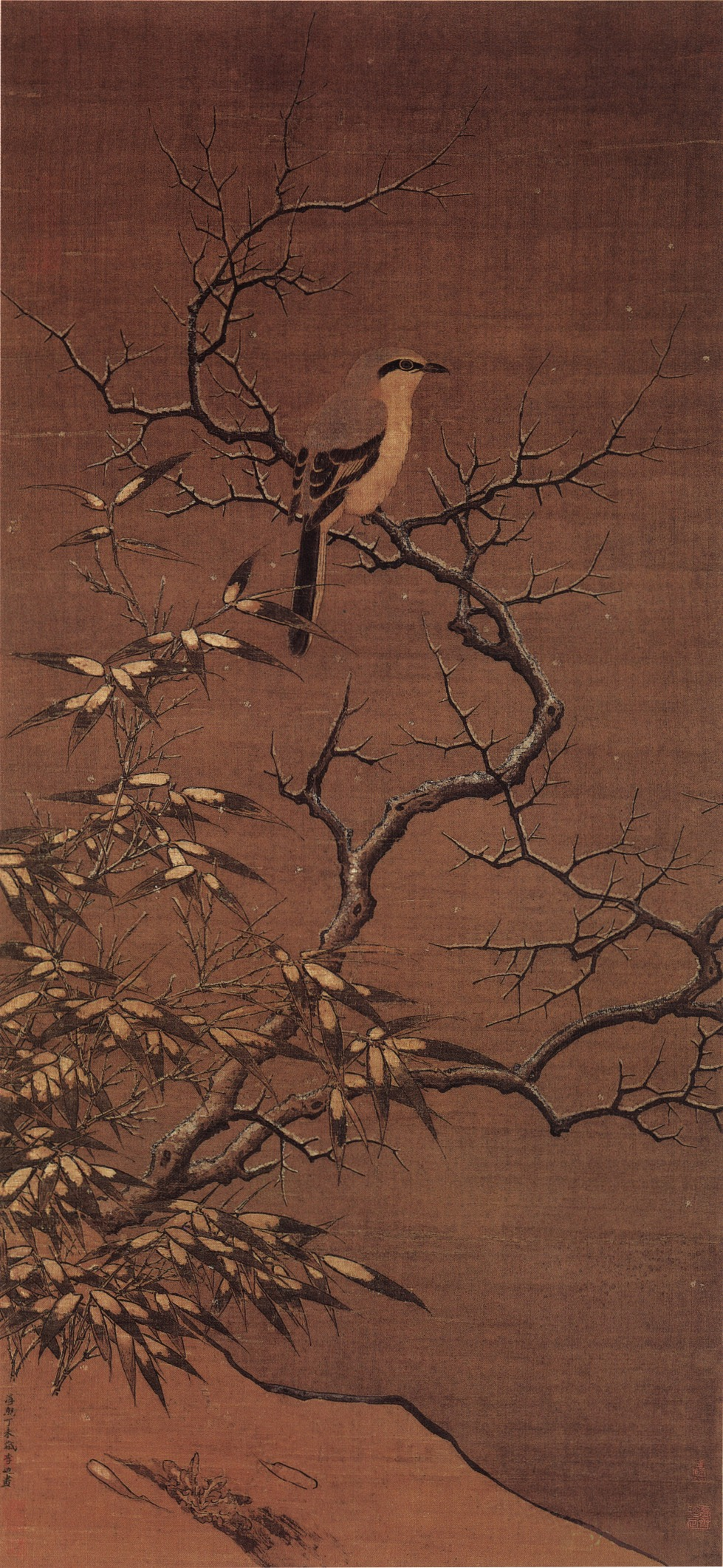
Shrike on a tree in winter; 1187 AD.

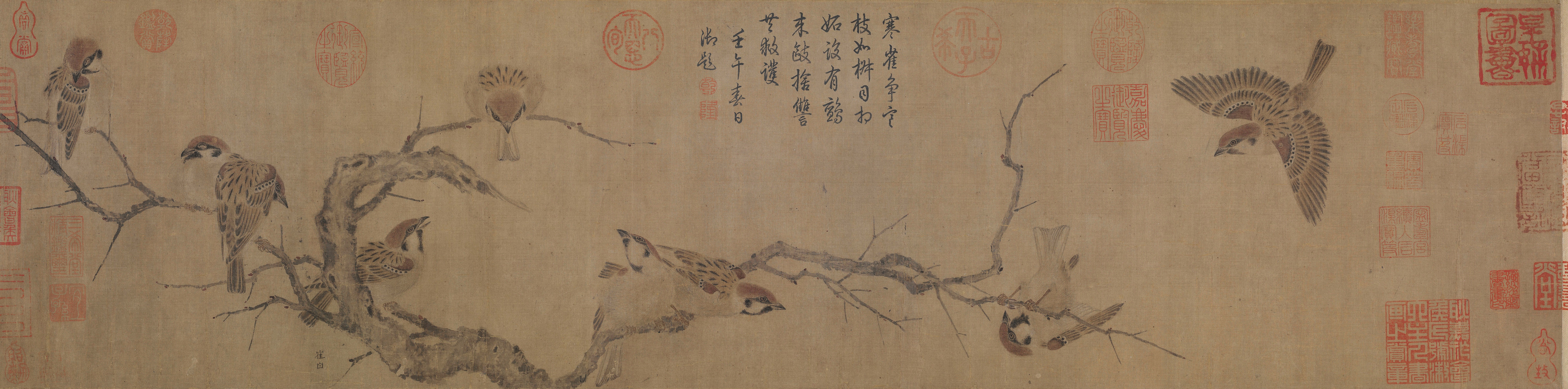
Wintry Sparrows by Cui Bai

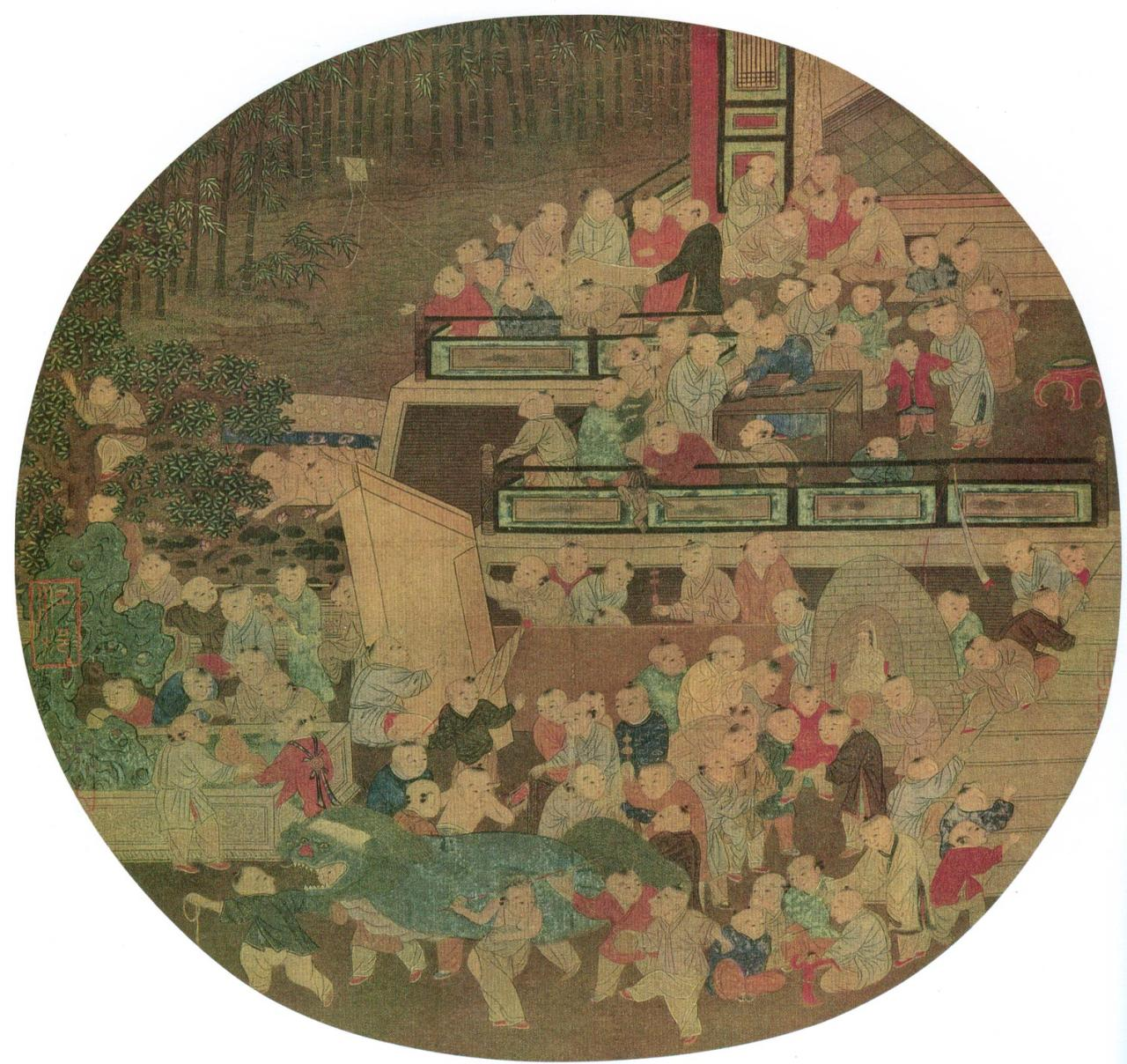
"One Hundred Children Playing in the Spring" by Su Hanchen((1094–1172))

The Knickknack Peddler by Su Hanchen; depictions of common life became a popular motif during the prosperous years of the Song dynasty

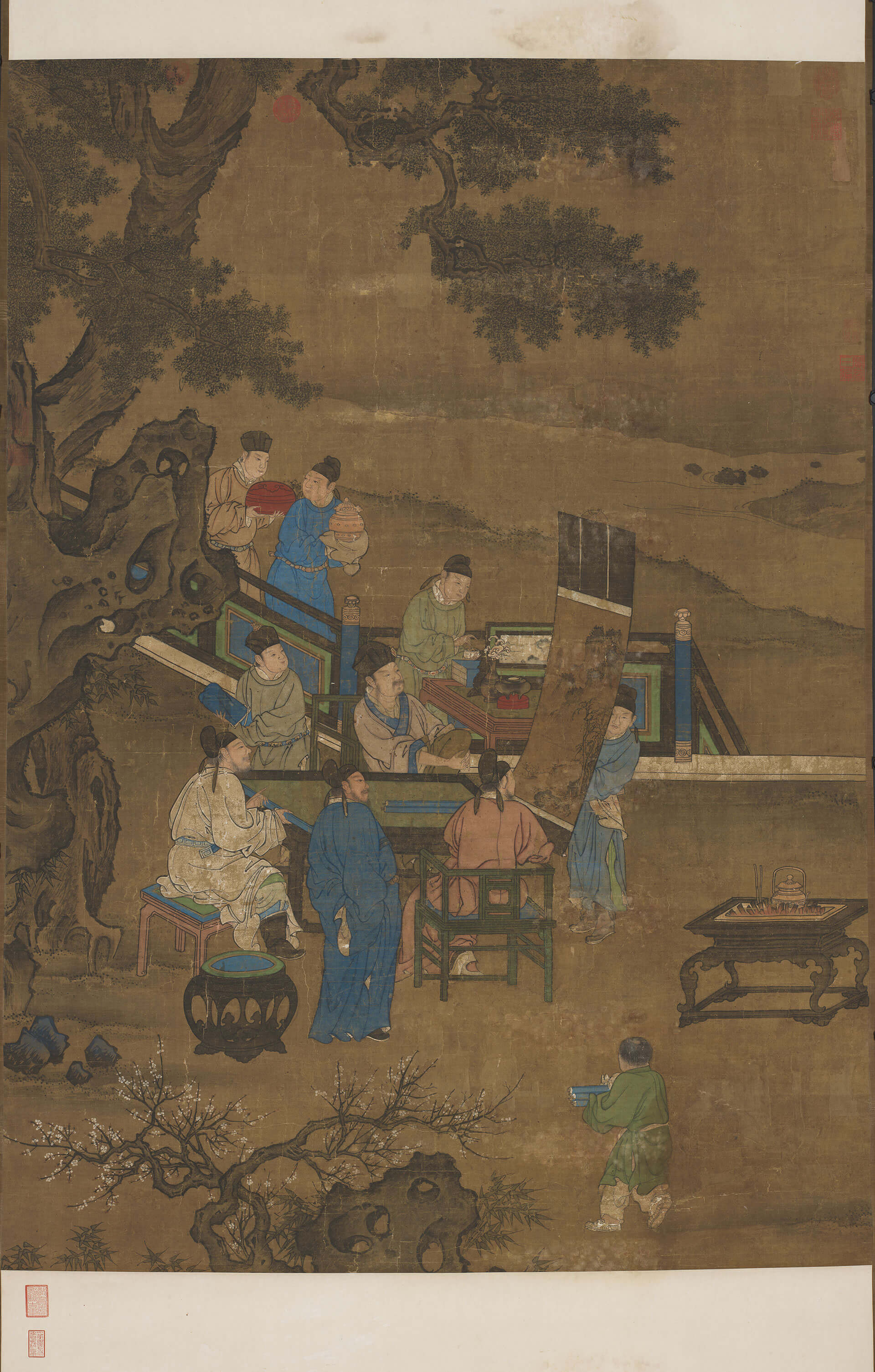
Depiction of Ancient Artifacts, unknown painter.

== Late imperial China (1368–1895) ==
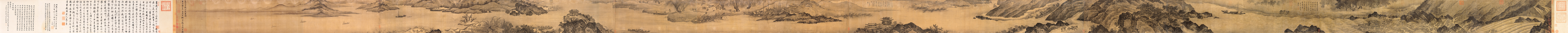
Ten Thousand Miles of the Yangtze River, Ming dynasty (1368–1644)

Beginning in the 13th century, the tradition of painting simple subjects—a branch with fruit, a few flowers, or one or two horses—developed. Narrative painting, with a wider color range and a much busier composition than Song paintings, was immensely popular during the Ming period (1368–1644).

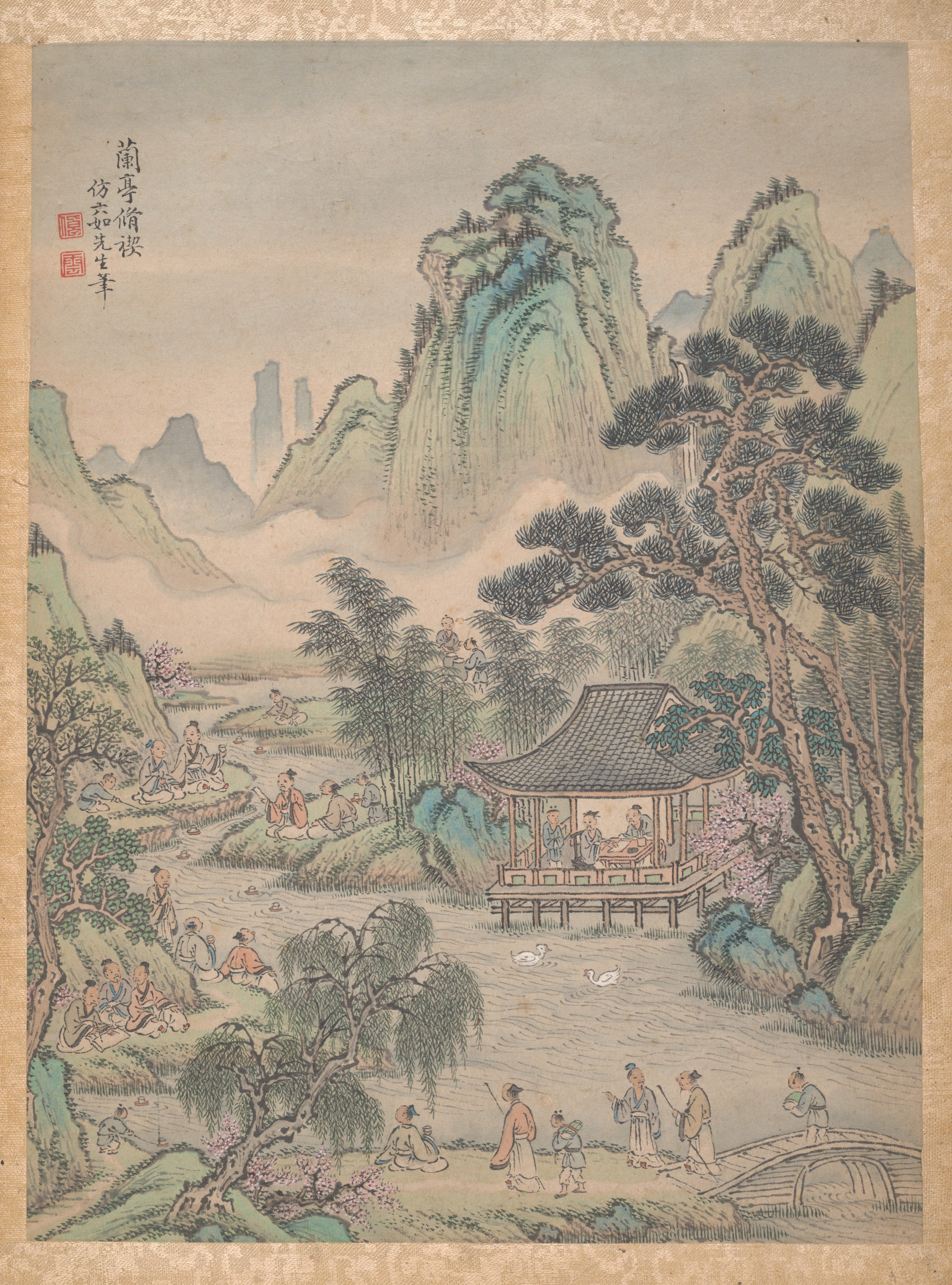
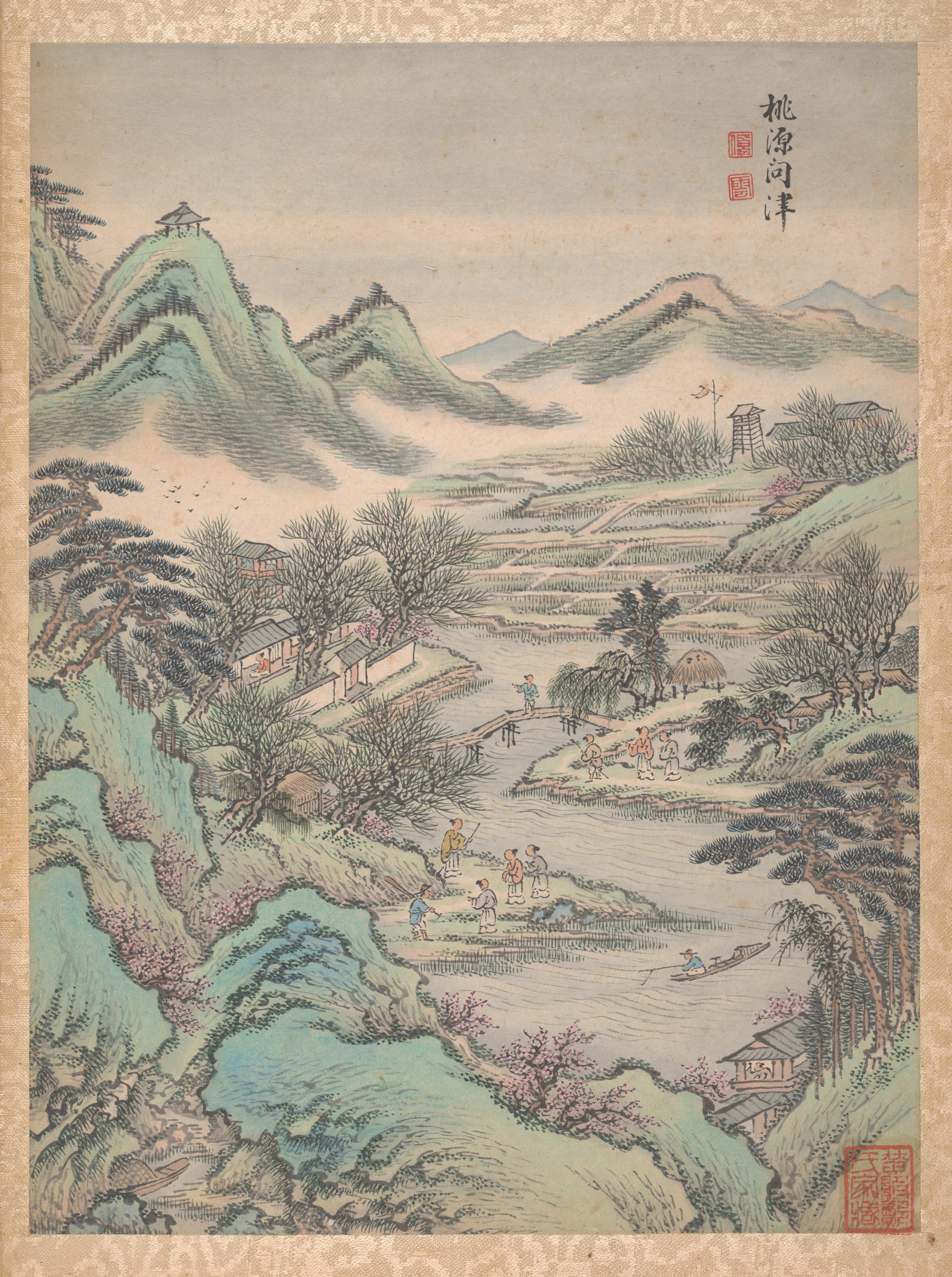
Early Qing works preserved the styles and sensibilities of Ming art, some even implied a nostalgic longing for the days of native rule before the Manchu conquest.

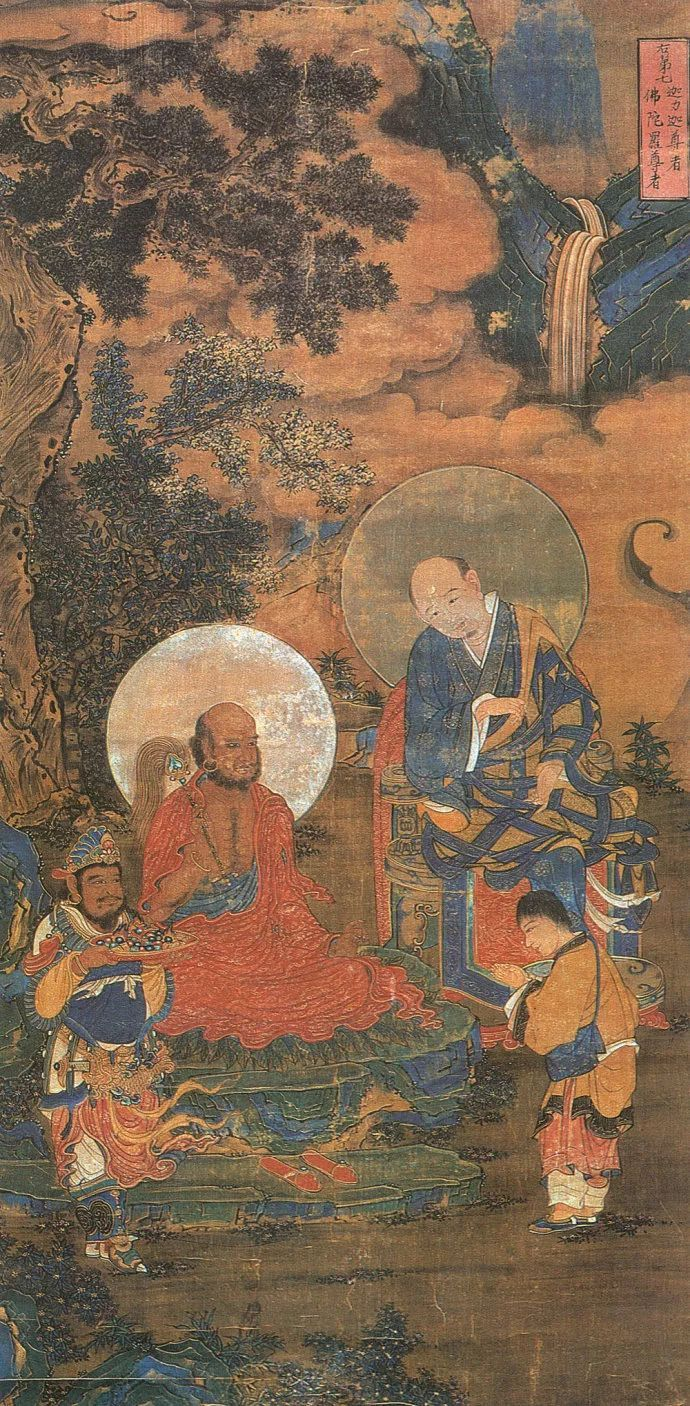
Two Luohans, Shuilu ritual painting from Baoning Temple, Shanxi, China.

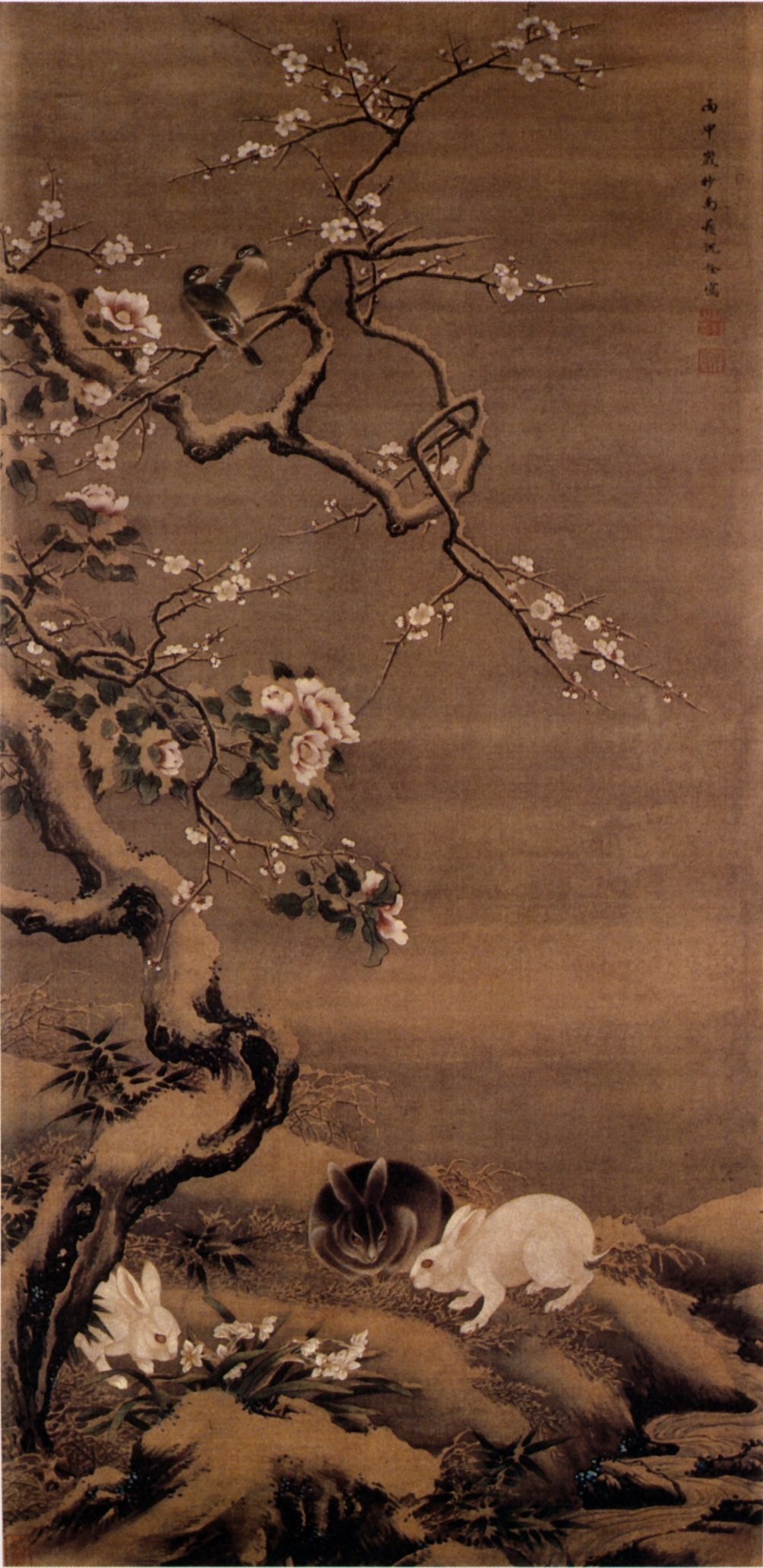
Early 18th century work by Shen Quan, like many contemporaries of his during the early Qing he spent much of his career in Japan and left a huge influence on Japanese art. In his case, by creating the Nanpin school of Nagasaki.

The first books illustrated with colored woodcuts appeared around this time; as color-printing techniques were perfected, illustrated manuals on the art of painting began to be published. Jieziyuan Huazhuan (Manual of the Mustard Seed Garden), a five-volume work first published in 1679, has been in use as a technical textbook for artists and students ever since.

Some painters of the Ming dynasty (1368–1644) continued the traditions of the Yuan scholar-painters. This group of painters, known as the Wu School, was led by the artist Shen Zhou. Another group of painters, known as the Zhe School, revived and transformed the styles of the Song court.

During the early Qing dynasty (1644–1911), painters known as Individualists rebelled against many of the traditional rules of painting and found ways to express themselves more directly through free brushwork. In the 18th and 19th centuries, great commercial cities such as Yangzhou and Shanghai became art centers where wealthy merchant-patrons encouraged artists to produce bold new works. However, similar to the phenomenon of key lineages producing, many well-known artists came from established artistic families. Such families were concentrated in the Jiangnan region and produced painters such as Ma Quan, Jiang Tingxi, and Yun Zhu.

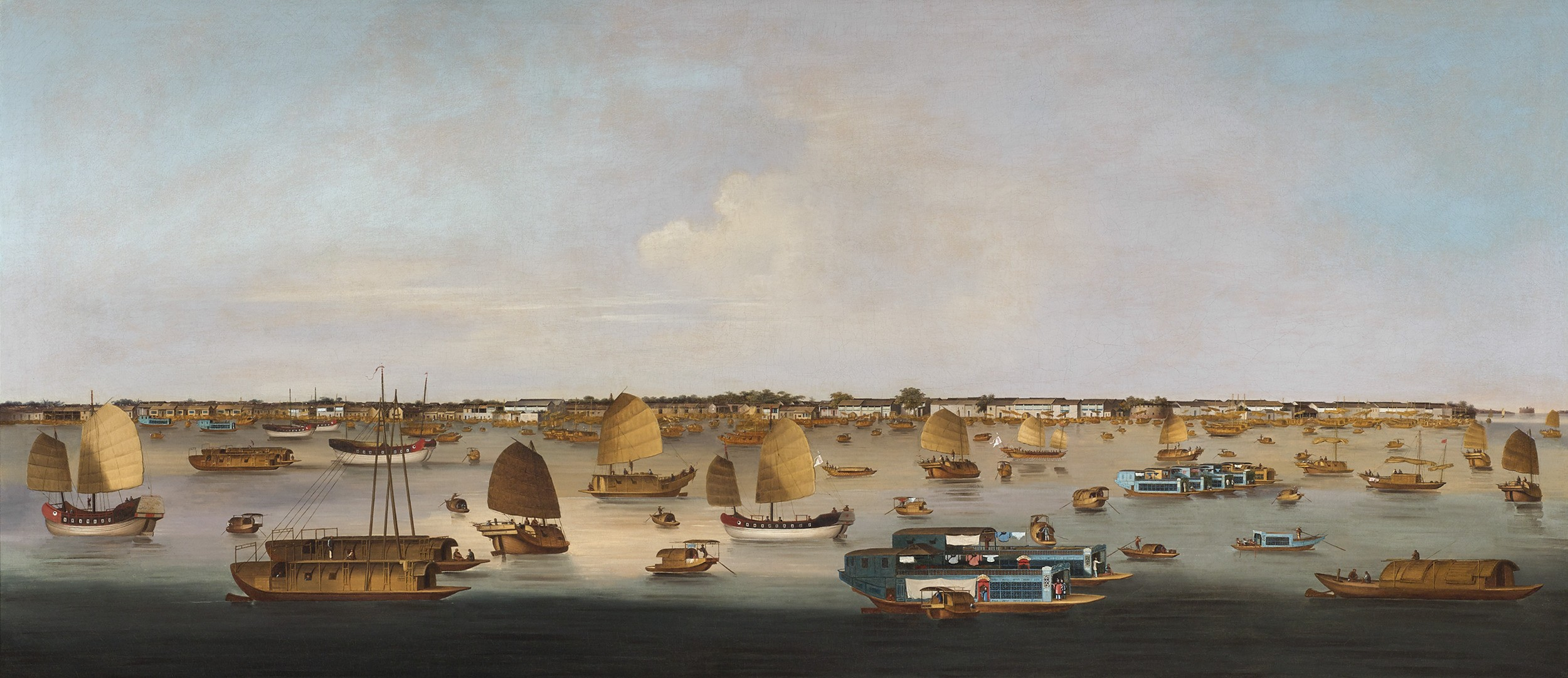
A View of Henan Island (Honam), Canton, Qing dynasty

It was also during this period when Chinese trade painters emerged. Taking advantage of British and other European traders in popular port cities such as Canton, these artists created works in the Western style particularly for Western traders. Known as Chinese export paintings, the trade thrived throughout the Qing dynasty.

In the late 19th and 20th centuries, Chinese painters were increasingly exposed to Western art. Some artists who studied in Europe rejected Chinese painting; others tried to combine the best of both traditions. Among the most beloved modern painters was Qi Baishi, who began life as a poor peasant and became a great master. His best-known works depict flowers and small animals.

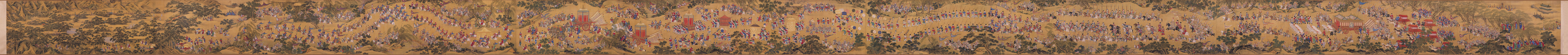
The panorama painting "Departure Herald", painted during the reign of the Wanli Emperor (1573–1620 AD), shows the emperor traveling on horseback with a large escort through the countryside from Beijing's Imperial City to the Ming dynasty tombs. Beginning with Yongle, thirteen Ming emperors were buried in the Ming Tombs of present-day Changping District.

== Modern painting ==
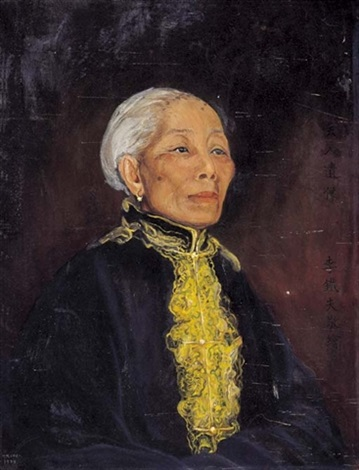
Portrait of Madame Liu (1942) Li Tiefu

Beginning with the New Culture Movement, Chinese artists started to adopt using Western techniques. Prominent Chinese artists who studied Western painting include Li Tiefu, Yan Wenliang, Xu Beihong, Lin Fengmian, Fang Ganmin and Liu Haisu.

=== Early PRC ===
After the founding of the People's Republic of China, the Communist Party's Propaganda Department organized networks of cultural workers' associations which were headed by the China Federation of Literary and Art Circles. The state incorporated existing cultural enterprises into the state apparatus, which provided stable income and working environments for artists.

In the early years of the PRC, artists were encouraged to employ socialist realism. Some Soviet Union socialist realism was imported without modification, and painters were assigned subjects and expected to mass-produce paintings. Following the model of the Soviet Union, the early PRC endorsed historical oil painting and the state commissioned many artistic works in this style to represent the new nation by depicting major battles and other events leading the country's proclamation. In this period, critics took a negative stance towards the guohua painting style.

This regimen was considerably relaxed in 1953, and after the Hundred Flowers Campaign of 1956–57, traditional Chinese painting experienced a significant revival. By the mid-1950s, relations between China and the Soviet Union were deteriorating, and Mao Zedong was increasingly eager for China to establish its own national path. Propaganda campaigns began to promote the re-adoption of traditional art styles as suitable for depicting modern social relations. The New Guohua Campaign asked painters to modernize the traditional style (which had historically been exclusive to China's ruling class) to portray the PRC's landscape. The traditional landscape form and techniques were largely retained, but new elements like the increased use of the color red and the incorporation of modern vehicles and cable lines were intended to convey socialist modernity.

Along with these developments in professional art circles, there was a proliferation of peasant art depicting everyday life in the rural areas on wall murals and in open-air painting exhibitions. During the Great Leap Forward, authorities promoted the Peasant Painting Movement, from which hundreds of thousands of new artists emerged. As part of this Movement, peasant artists decorated village walls with Great Leap Forward-themed murals. The Great Leap Forward also prompted a second wave of the New Guohua Campaign in which the state commissioned landscape artists to paint new production projects; select paintings of the campaign were taught in schools, published widely as propaganda posters, exhibited in museums, and used as the backdrops of state events.

During the Cultural Revolution, art schools were closed, and publication of art journals and major art exhibitions ceased. Major destruction was also carried out as part of the elimination of Four Olds campaign. During the Cultural Revolution, the spread of peasant paintings in rural China became one of the newborn things celebrated in a socialist society.

=== Since 1978 ===
Following the Cultural Revolution, art schools and professional organizations were reinstated. Exchanges were set up with groups of foreign artists, and Chinese artists began to experiment with new subjects and techniques. One particular case of freehand style (xieyi hua) may be noted in the work of the child prodigy Wang Yani (born 1975) who started painting at age 3 and has since considerably contributed to the exercise of the style in contemporary artwork.

After Chinese economic reform, more and more artists boldly conducted innovations in Chinese painting. The innovations include: development of new brushing skill such as vertical direction splash water and ink, with representative artist Tiancheng Xie, creation of new style by integration traditional Chinese and Western painting techniques such as Heaven Style painting, with representative artist Shaoqiang Chen, and new styles that express contemporary theme and typical nature scene of certain regions such as Lijiang Painting Style, with representative artist Gesheng Huang. A 2008 set of paintings by Cai Jin, most well known for her use of psychedelic colors, showed influences of both Western and traditional Chinese sources, though the paintings were organic abstractions.

=== Contemporary Chinese art ===
Chinese painting continues to play an essential role in Chinese cultural expression. Starting in the mid-twentieth century, artists begin to combine traditional Chinese painting techniques with Western art styles, leading to the style of new contemporary Chinese art. One of the representative artists is Wei Dong who drew inspirations from eastern and western sources to express national pride and arrive at personal actualization. Another key figure is Liu Dan, known for his ink painting.

Pan Yuliang (1895–1977) was a Chinese artist whose work explored questions of identity and self-representation. According to art historian Sandy Ng, Pan signed her paintings simply as "Yuliang," omitting her adopted surname, "Pan." In many of her paintings, she elongated the final stroke of the Chinese character liang in her signature.

== Iconography in Chinese painting ==
=== Water Mill ===
As the landscape painting rose and became the dominant style in North Song dynasty, artists began to shift their attention from jiehua painting, which indicates paintings of Chinese architectural objects such as buildings, boats, wheels and vehicles, towards landscape paintings. Intertwining with the imperial landscape painting, water mill, an element of jiehua painting, though, is still used as an imperial symbol. Water mill depicted in the Water Mill is a representation for the revolution of technology, economy, science, mechanical engineering and transportation in Song dynasty. It represents the government directly participate in the milling industry which can influence commercial activities. Another evidence that shows the government interfered with the commercial is a wineshop that appears beside the water mill. The water mill in Shanghai Scroll reflects the development in engineering and growing knowledge in hydrology. Furthermore, a water mill can also be used to identify a painting and used as a literature metaphor. Lately, the water mill transform into a symbolic form representing the imperial court.

A Thousand Miles of Rivers and Mountains by Wang Ximeng, celebrates the imperial patronage and builds up a bridge that ties the later emperors, Huizong, Shenzong with their ancestors, Taizu and Taizong. The water mill in this painting, unlike that is painted in previous Shanghai scroll to be solid and weighted, it is painted to be ambiguous and vague to match up with the court taste of that time. The painting reflects a slow pace and peaceful idyllic style of living. Located deeply in a village, the water mill is driven by the force of a huge, vertical waterwheel which is powered by a sluice gate. The artist seems to be ignorance towards hydraulic engineering since he only roughly drew out the mechanism of the whole process. A Thousand Miles of Rivers and Mountainspainted by Wang Ximeng, a court artist taught directly by Huizong himself. Thus, the artwork A Thousand Miles of Rivers and Mountainsshould directly review the taste of the imperial taste of the landscape painting. Combining richness bright blue and turquoise pigments heritage from Tang dynasty with the vastness and solemn space and mountains from Northern Song, the scroll is a perfect representation of imperial power and aesthetic taste of the aristocrats.

=== Image as Word: Rebus ===
There is a long tradition of having hidden meaning behind certain objects in Chinese paintings. A fan painting by an unknown artist from North Song period depicts three gibbons capturing baby egrets and scaring the parents away. The rebus behind this scene is interpreted as celebrating the examination success. Since another painting which has similar subjects—gibbons and egrets, is given the title of San yuan de lu三猿得鹭, or Three gibbons catching egrets. As the rebus, the sound of the title can also be written as 三元得路, meaning "a triple first gains [one] power." 元represents "first" replaces its homophonous 猿, and 路means road, replaces 鹭. Sanyuan is firstly recorded as a term referring to people getting triple first place in an exam in Qingsuo gaoyi by a North Song writer Liu Fu, and the usage of this new term gradually spread across the country where the scenery of gibbons and egrets is widely accepted. Lately, other scenery derived from the original paintings, including deer in the scene because in Chinese, deer, lu is also a homophonous of egrets. Moreover, the number of gibbons depicted in the painting can be flexible, not only limited to three, sanyuan. Since the positions in Song courts are held by elites who achieved jinshi degree, the paintings with gibbons, egrets or deer are used for praising those elites in general.

Emperor Huizong personally painted a painting called Birds in a blossom wax-plum tree, features with two "hoary headed birds," "Baitou weng" resting on a tree branch together. "Baitou" in Chinese culture is allusion to faithful love and marriage. In a well-known love poem, it wrote: "I wish for a lover in whose heart I alone exist, unseparated even our heads turn hoary." During Huizong's rule, literati rebus is embedded in court painting academy and became part of the test routine to enter the imperial court. During Song dynasty, the connection between painters and literati, paintings and poem is closer.

=== The Donkey Rider ===
"The country is broken; mountains and rivers remain." The poem by Du Fu (712–770) reflects the major principle in Chinese culture: the dynasty might change, but the landscape is eternal. This timelessness theme evolved from Six Dynasties period and early Northern Song. A donkey rider travelling through the mountains, rivers and villages is studied as an important iconographical character in developing of landscape painting.

The donkey rider in the painting Travelers in a wintry forest by Li Cheng is assumed to be a portrait painting of Meng Haoran, "a tall and lanky man dressed in a scholar plain robe, riding on a small horse followed by a young servant." Except Meng Haoran, other famous people for example, Ruan Ji, one of the seven sages of the Bamboo Grove and Du Fu, a younger contemporary of Meng are also depicted as donkey rider. Tang dynasty poets Jia Dao and Li He and early Song dynasty elites Pan Lang, Wang Anshi appears on the paintings as donkey rider. North Song poets Lin Bu and Su Shi are lately depicted as donkey rider. In this specific painting Travelers in a wintry forest, the potential candidates for the donkey rider are dismissed and the character can only be Meng Haoran. Meng Haoran has made more than two hundred poems in his life but none of them is related with donkey ride. Depicting him as a donkey rider is a historical invention and Meng represents a general persona than an individual character. Ruan Ji was depicted as donkey rider since he decided to escape the office life and went back to the wilderness. The donkey he was riding is representing his poverty and eccentricity. Du Fu was portrayed as the rider to emphasis his failure in office achievement and also his poor living condition. Meng Haoran, similar to those two figures, disinterested in office career and acted as a pure scholar in the field of poem by writing real poems with real experience and real emotional attachment with the landscape. The donkey rider is said to travel through time and space. The audience are able to connect with the scholars and poets in the past by walking on the same route as those superior ancestors have gone on. Besides the donkey rider, there is always a bridge for the donkey to across. The bridge is interpreted to have symbolic meaning that represents the road which hermits depart from capital city and their official careers and go back to the natural world.

=== Realm of the Immortals ===
During Song dynasty, paintings with themes ranging from animals, flowers, landscape and classical stories, are used as ornaments in the imperial palace, government office and elites' residence for multiple purposes. The theme of the art in display is carefully picked to reflect not only personal taste, but also his social status and political achievement. In emperor Zhezong's lecture hall, a painting depicting stories from the Zhou dynasty was hanging on the wall to remind Zhezong how to be a good ruler of the empire. The painting also serves the purpose of expressing his determination to his court officers to be an enlightened emperor.

The main walls of the government office, also called walls of the "Jade Hall," meaning the residence of the immortals in Taoism are decorated by decorative murals. Most educated and respected scholars were selected and given the title xueshi. They were divided into groups in helping the Institute of Literature and were described as descending from the immortals. Xueshi received high social status and had carefree jobs. Later, the xueshi yuan, the place where the xueshi lived, became the permanent government institution that helped the emperor to make imperial decrees.

During Tang dynasty reign of Emperor Xianzong (805–820), the west wall of the xueshi yuan was covered by murals depicting dragon-like mountain scenes. In 820–822, immortal animals like Mount Ao, flying cranes, and xianqin, a kind of immortal bird were added to the murals. Those immortal symbols all indicate the xueshi yuan as an eternally existing government office.

During the Song dynasty, the xueshi yuan was modified and moved with the dynasty to the new capital Hangzhou in 1127. The mural painted by Song artist Dong yu, closely followed the tradition of the Tang dynasty in depicting the misty sea surrounding the immortal mountains. The scenery on the walls of the Jade Hall, which was full of misty clouds and mysterious lands is closely related to the Taoist tradition. When Yan Su, a painter following the style of Li Cheng, was invited to paint the screen behind the seat of the emperor, he included elaborately constructed pavilions, mist clouds and mountain landscape painting in his work. The theme of his painting suggests the immortal realm which accords with the entire theme that the Jade Hall provides to its viewer, the feeling of otherworldliness. Another painter, Guo Xi made another screen painting for emperor Shenzong, depicting mountains in spring in a harmonized atmosphere. The image also includes immortal elements Mount Tianlao which is one of the realms of the immortals. In his painting, Early Spring, the strong branches of the trees reflects the life force of the living creatures, implying the emperor's benevolent rule.

=== Images of women ===
Female characters are almost excluded from traditional Chinese painting under the influence of Confucianism. Dong Zhongshu, an influential Confucian scholar in the Han dynasty, proposed the three-bond theory saying that: "the ruler is Yang and the subject is Yin, father is Yang and son is Yin…The husband is Yang, and the wife is Yin," which places females in a subordinate position to that of males. Under the three-bond theory, women are depicted as housewives who need to obey to their husbands and fathers in literature. Similarly, in the portrait paintings, female characters are also depicted as exemplary women to elevate the rule of males. A hand roll Exemplary Womenby Ku Kai Zhi, a six Dynasty artist, depicted woman characters who may be a wife, a daughter or a widow.

During the Tang dynasty, artists slowly began to appreciate the beauty of a woman's body (shinu). Artist Zhang Xuan produced a painting named palace women listening to music that captured women's elegance and pretty faces. However, women were still being depicted as submissive and ideal within the male system.

During the Song dynasty, as the love poem emerged, the images associated with those love stories were made as attractive as possible to meet the taste of the male viewers.

== Landscape painting ==
A timeline of Chinese landscape painting from early Tang to the present day

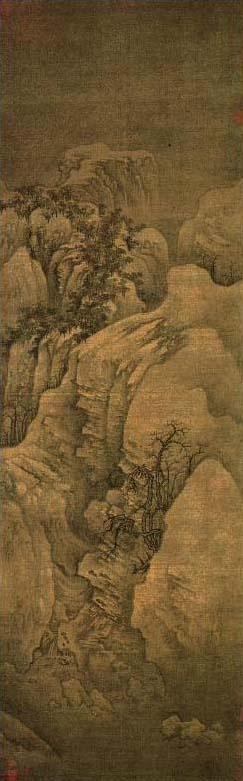
A landscape painting by Guo Xi. This piece shows a scene of deep and serene mountain valley covered with snow and several old trees struggling to survive on precipitous cliffs.

=== Paradigm shift in representation ===
Northern Song landscape painting differs from Southern Song painting because of its paradigm shift in representation. If Southern Song period landscape painting is said to be looking inward, Northern Song painting is reaching outward. During the Northern Song period, the rulers' goal is to consolidate and extend the elites value across the society. Whereas Southern Song painters decided to focus on personal expression. Northern Song landscapes are regarded as "real landscape", since the court appreciated the representation relationship between art and the external world, rather than the relationship between art and the artists inner voice. The painting, A Thousand Miles of Rivers and Mountains is horizontally displayed and there are four mountain ranges arranged from left to right. Similar to another early Southern Song painter, Zhou Boju, both artists glorified their patrons by presenting the gigantic empire images in blue and green landscape painting. The only difference is that in Zhou's painting, there are five mountain ranges arranged from right to left. The scenes in the Southern Song paintings are about north landscape that echo the memory of their lost north territory. However, ironically, some scholars suggested that Wang Ximeng's A Thousand Miles of Rivers and Mountains depicts the scenes of the south not the north.

=== Buddhist and Taoist influences ===
The Chinese landscape painting are believed to be affected by the intertwining Chinese traditional religious beliefs, for example, "the Taoist love of nature", and "Buddhist principle of emptiness," and can represent the diversification of artists attitudes and thoughts from previous period. The Taoist love of nature is not always present in Chinese landscape painting but gradually developed from Six Dynasties period when Taoists Lao-tzu, Chuang-tzu, the Pao-p'u tzu's thoughts are reflected in literature documents. Apart from the contemporary Confucian tradition of insisting on human cultivation and learning to be more educated and build up social framework, Taoist persist on going back to human's origin, which is to be ignorant. Taoists believe that if one discard wise, the robbery will stop. If people abandon expensive jewelry, thieves will not exist. From the Han dynasty, the practice of Taoism was associated with alchemical and medicine made. To better pursuit Taoism belief, Taoist need to go on pilgrim into specific mountains to connect themselves with the spirits and immortals that lived in those mountains. In the third and fourth century, the practice of escaping society and going back to nature mediating in the countryside is further enhanced by a group called Seven Sages of the Bamboo Grove who would like to escape from the civil unrest. The wise men fleet the world and wonder in the countryside and enjoy the tranquil landscape and forgot to return. The Taoism ideology of forgetfulness, self-cultivation, harmonizing with nature world, and purifying soul by entering the isolated mountains to mediate and seek medicine herbs create the scene of landscape painting.

During the Han dynasty, the mountains appeared in the design of the artworks shows the prevalence role of mountain in Han society. The emperor would climb on to the mountain to sacrifice and religion practice because mountains are thought to have connection between earth and heaven and can link human with spirits and immortals. And sometimes, mountains are depicted as mystical mountains" (shenshan), where sages and legendary animals settled. Hence, landscape painting is used as an object for Taoism practice which provide visualize form for religious ritual. During the Six Dynasties period, the landscape painting experienced a stylistic change which myth and poem depiction were introduced into the painting. For example, in Ku Kai-chih's "Nymph of the river" scroll and "The Admonitions of the Court Preceptress", audience are able to read narrative description and text accompanied by visualized images.

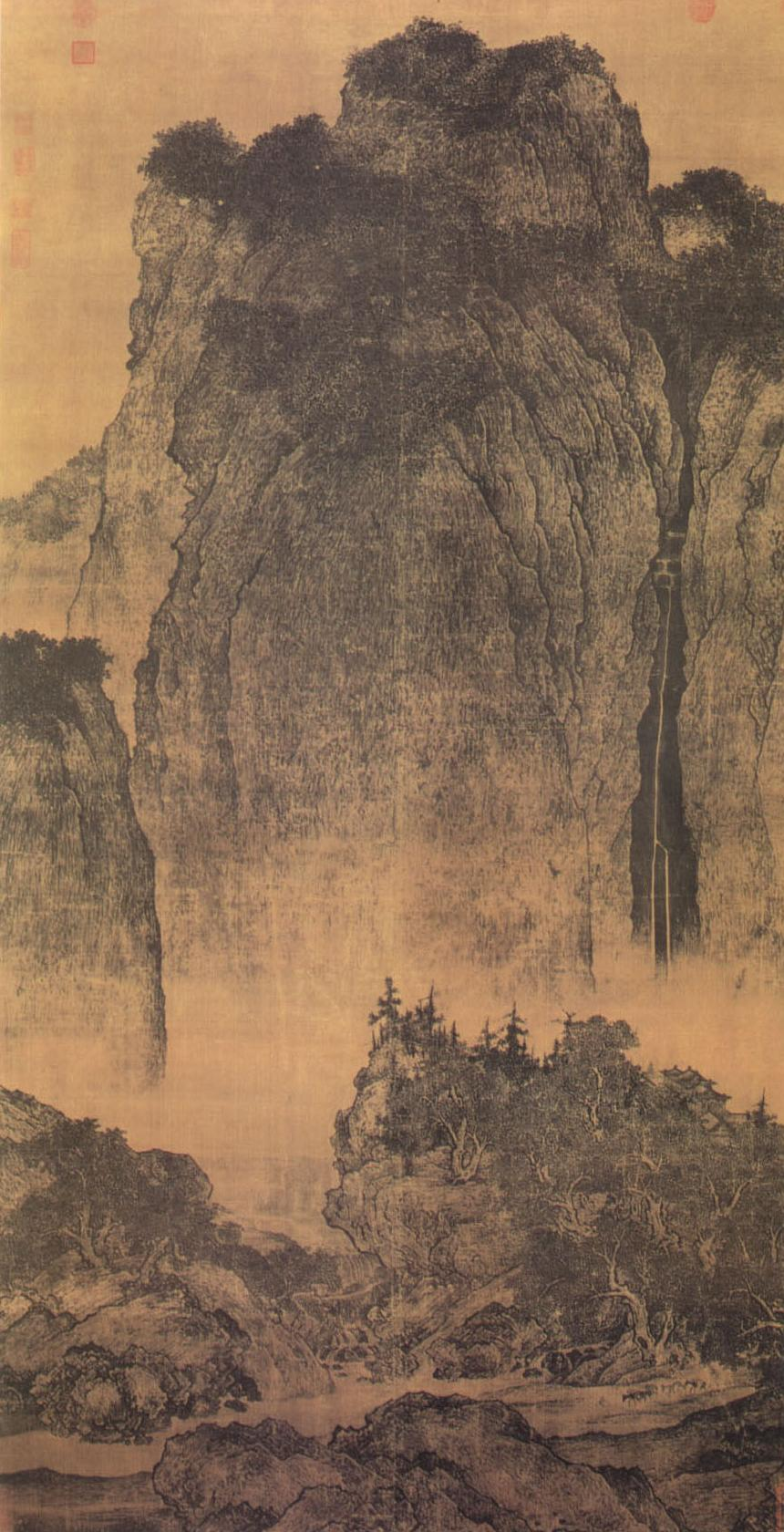
Fan Kuan's Travelers among Mountains and Streams, 10th century AD; National Palace Museum, Taipei

Furthermore, in Buddhism, the mountain also has an important role in religious practice. From an iconographical point of view, a Buddha's image is used in helping a believer to practice meditation. For instance, Buddha's reflection image, or shadow, is assimilated with the image of a mountain, Lushan. This assimilation is also recorded in a poem by poet from the Six Dynasties period who pointed out that the beauty and numinosity of the mountain can elevate the spiritual connection between human being and the spirits. Thus, the landscape painting come into display Buddha's image in people's everyday ritual practice. Hui-yuan described in his poem that "Lushan seems to mirror the divine appearance" which unifies the two images—the true image and the reflection of Buddha. Moreover, spiritual elevation can be achieved by contemplating in front of landscape painting which depict the same mountain and path those old sages have been to. The painting contains both the spiritual force (ling) and the truth (li) of Buddha and also the objects that no longer physically presence. Hui-Yuan's famous image is closely relation with its landscape scene indicating the trend of transformation from Buddha image to landscape painting as a religious practice.

=== Early landscape painting ===
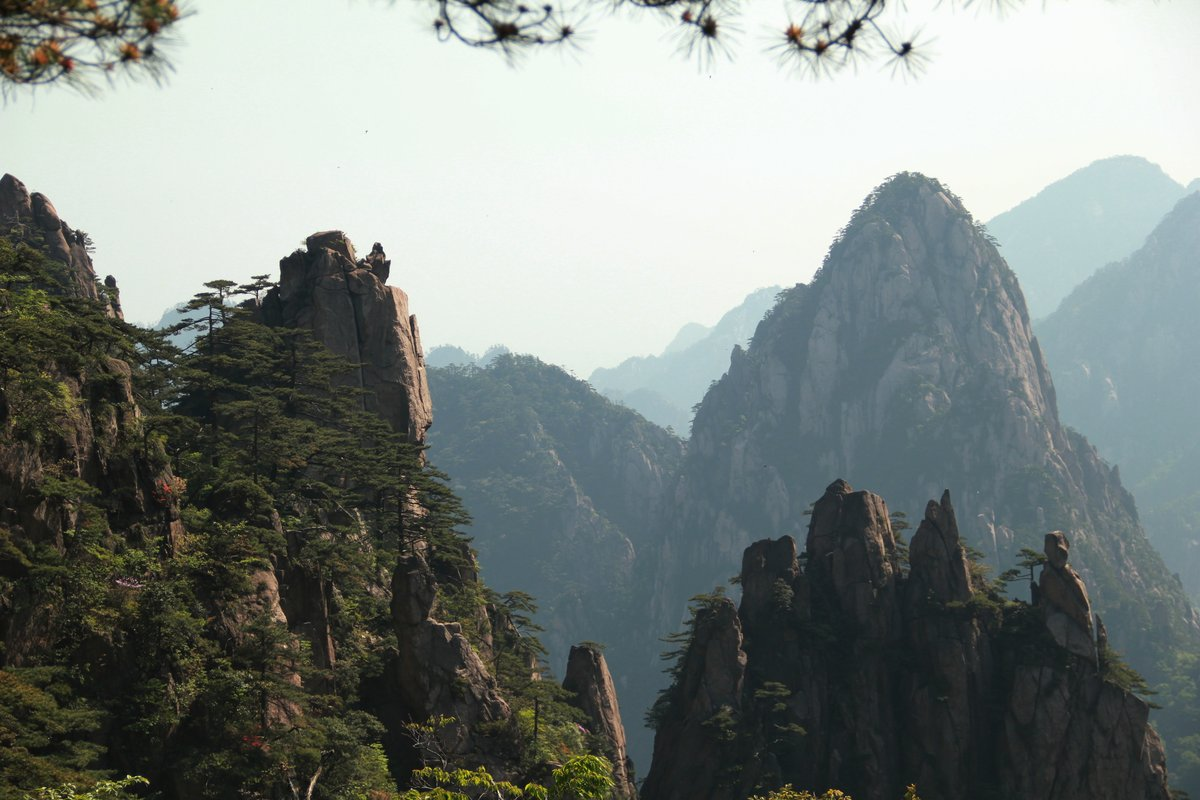
Landscape paintings often depicted the exotic and fantastical mountains of southern China

In Chinese society, there is a long-time appreciation of natural beauty. The early themes of poems, artworks are associated with agriculture and everyday life associates with fields, animals. On the other hand, later Chinese painting pursuits majesty and grand. Thus, mountain scenery become the most popular subject to paint because it's high which represent human eminence. Also, mountain is stable and permanent suggests the eminent of the imperial power. Furthermore, mountain is difficult to climb showing the difficulties human will face through their lives.

Landscape painting evolved under the influence of Taoist who fled from civil turbulence and prosecution of the government and went back to the wilderness. However, the development of Taoism was hindered by Han dynasty. During Han dynasty, the empire expanded and enlarged its political and economic influence. Hence, the Taoism's anti-social belief was disfavored by the imperial government. Han rulers only favored portrait painting which enabled their image to be perpetuate and their civilians to see and to memorize their great leaders or generals. Landscape at that time only focus on the trees for literary or talismanic value. The usage of landscape painting as ornament is suspects to be borrowed from other societies outside Han empire during its expansion to the Near East. Landscape and animal scene began to appear on the jars, but the decoration has little to do with connection with the natural world. Also, there is evidence showing that the emerging of landscape painting is not derived from map-making.

During the Three Kingdoms and Six Dynasties, landscape painting began to have connection with literati and the production of poems. Taoism influence on people's appreciation of landscaping deceased and nature worshipping superseded. However, Taoist still used landscape painting in their meditation just as Confucius uses portrait painting in their ritual practice. (Ku Kai Chih's admonitions) During this time period, the landscape painting is more coherence with variation trees, rocks and branches. Moreover, the painting is more elaborated and organized. The evolution in landscape painting during the Six Dynasties is that artists harmonized sprit with the nature. (Wu Tao-tzu) Buddhism might also contribute in affecting changes in landscape painting. The artists began to show space and depth in their works where they showed mountain mass, distanced hills and clouds. The emptiness of the space is helping the believers meditating to enter the space of emptiness and nothingness.

The most important development in landscape painting is that people came to recognize the infinity variation of the nature world, so they tended to make each tree individualized. Every landscape painting is restricted by storytelling and is dependent on artists memory.

=== Dyads ===
Chinese landscape painting, "shanshui hua" means the painting of mountains, rivers, and cliffs which are the two major components that represents the essence of the nature. Shanshui in Chinese tradition is given rich meaning, for example mountain represents Yang and river indicates Yin. According to Yin Yang theory, Yin embodies Yang and Yang involved in Yin, thus, mountain and river is inseparable and is treated as a whole in a painting. In the Mountains and rivers without end, for example, "the dyad of the mountain uplift, subduction, and erosion and the planetary water cycle" is consistent with the dyad of Buddhism iconography, both representing austerity and generous loving spirit.

== Art as cartography ==
"Arts in maps, arts as maps, maps in arts, and maps as arts," are the four relationships between art and map. Making a distinction between map and art is difficult because there are cartographic elements in both paintings. Early Chinese map making considered earth surface as flat, so artists would not take projection into consideration. Moreover, map makers did not have the idea of map scale. Chinese people from Song dynasty called paintings, maps and other pictorial images as tu, so it's impossible to distinguish the types of each painting by name. Artists who paint landscape as an artwork focus mainly on the natural beauty rather on the accuracy and realistic representation of the object. Map on the other hand should be depicted in a precise manner which more focus on the distance and important geographic features.

The two examples in this case:

The Changjiang Wan Li Tu, although the date and the authorship are not clear, the painting is believed to be made in Song dynasty by examining the place names recorded on the painting. Only based on the name of this painting, it is hard to distinguish whether this painting is painted as a landscape painting or as a map.

The Shu Chuan Shenggai was once thought as the product done by North Song artist Li Gonglin, however, later evidence disapproved this thought and proposed the date should be changed to the end of South Song and artist remains unknown.

Both those paintings, aiming to enhance viewers appreciation on the beauty and majesty of landscape painting, focusing on the light condition and conveying certain attitude, are characterized as masterpiece of art rather than map.

== Traditional Restoration Processes ==
Traditional Chinese painting restoration generally consists of four stages: “Xi, Jie, Bu, and Quan” (洗，揭，补，全）, correspond to washing the painting, removing the old backing paper, mending the missing parts, and completing the color.

Xi Stage - Washing

Soak the painting in water and use a brush and towel to remove the stains. Before separation, use a flat brush dipped in clean or warm water to wet the painting, then cover it with a new sheet of paper. Place it face down on the table and wait for separation.

Jie Stage - Separating

Remove the residue from old paper or silk. If the separation cannot be completed in one day, evenly place some moist paper balls on the areas already separated, then cover with a layer of plastic film.

Bu Stage - Mending

Select appropriate repair paper, align the fibers properly, and apply the patch. Rub the edges of the patch to thin them out, so the joint is of suitable thickness. When repairing damaged silk-based calligraphy or paintings, one method is to wait until the separation is complete and dry, then use a knife to trim the damaged area into a thin edge. Apply paste to attach the repair silk, and after the paste dries, trim the edges of the repair silk to ensure a seamless joint. Another method is to mount a thin layer of silk beneath that closely matches the original silk in texture and weave.

Quan Stage - Completing

Paint the missing parts of the painting. This is done on the damaged areas by carefully matching the colors and artistic intent, using various traditional Chinese mineral pigments. The colors are applied meticulously, stroke by stroke, sometimes requiring seven or eight layers, until the retouched areas are indistinguishable from the original.

== See also ==
- Bird-and-flower painting
- Chinese art
- Chinese Piling paintings
- Danqing
- Eastern art history
- Eight Eccentrics of Yangzhou
- Eight Views of Xiaoxiang
- Gongbi
- History of Asian art
- History of painting
- Japanese painting
- Korean painting
- Lingnan School (also called Cantonese School)
- The Four Great Academy Presidents
- Three perfections – integration of calligraphy, poetry and painting
- Shuilu ritual paintings
- Wǔ Xíng painting
- List of Chinese painters
- List of Chinese women artists
