= Gao Kegong =

Chinese artist (1248–1310)

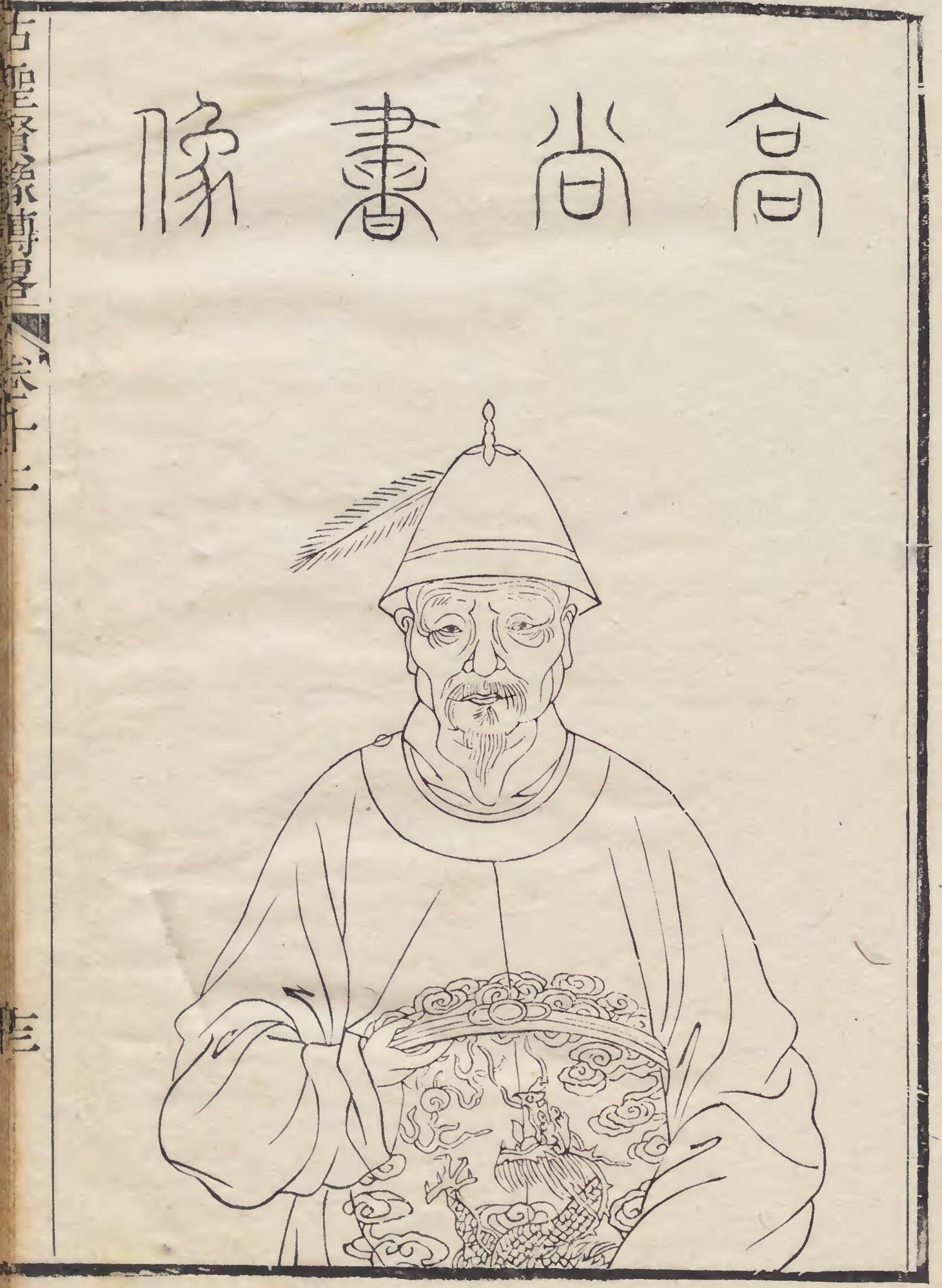
Gao Kegong

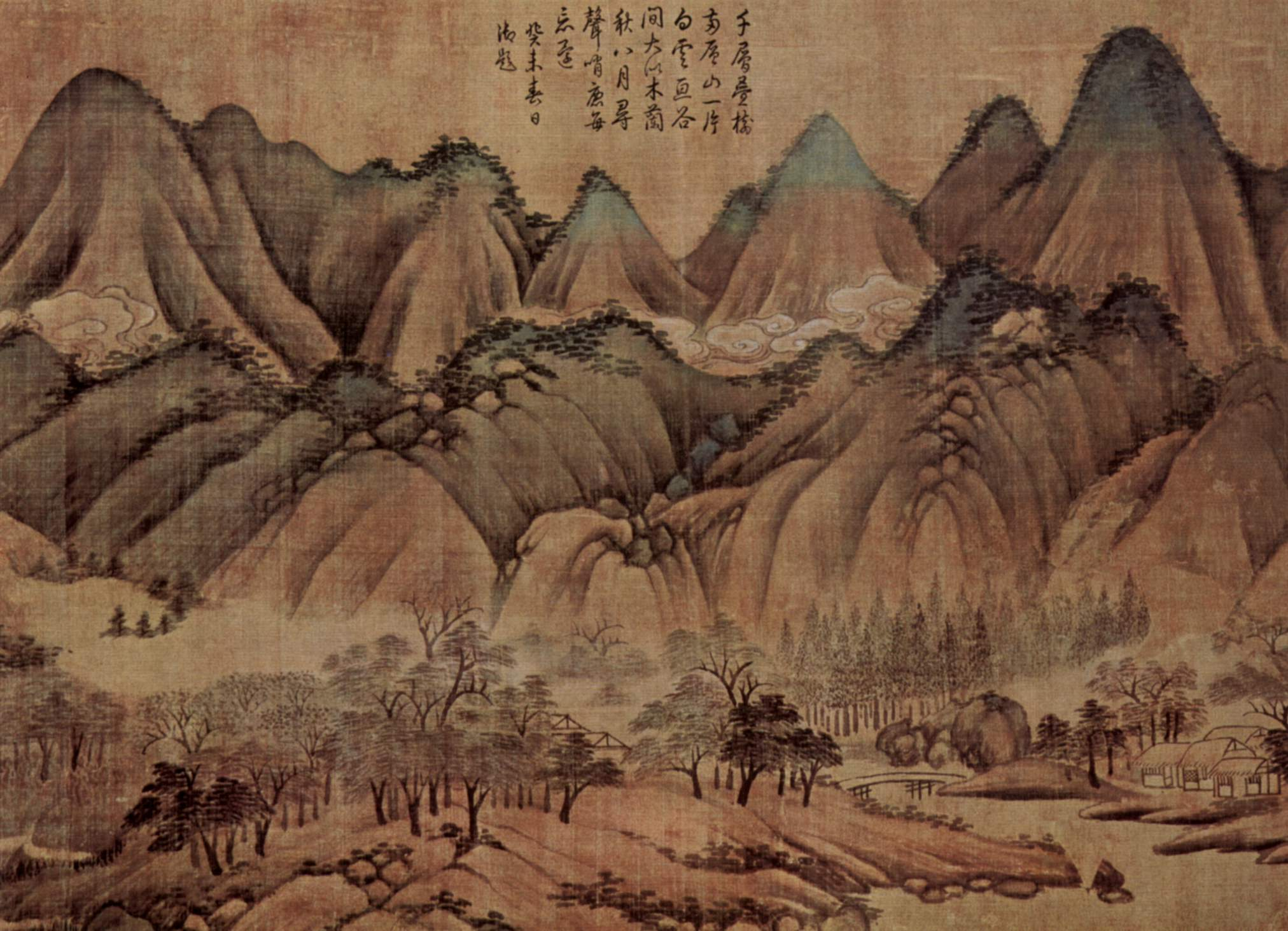
Gao Kegong, Hill Growing to Green and White Clouds, National Palace Museum

Gao Kegong (simplified Chinese: 高克恭; traditional Chinese: 髙克恭; pinyin: Gaō Kègōng; Wade–Giles: Kao K'o-kung; 1248–1310) was a Chinese painter, and sometimes poet, born during the Yuan dynasty; he was known for his landscapes.

He was heavily influenced by father and son, Mi Fu and Mi Youren. He also studied Dong Yuan, Ju Ran, Wang Tingyun and Li Cheng.

He was a good friend and colleague of Zhao Mengfu, and his paintings showed an artistic combination between Han and other minorities during the Yuan Dynasty.

From 1300 he served the government as an assistant minister at the Ministry of Works.

== See also ==
- Yuan poetry
