= Ji Cheng (Ming dynasty) =

Chinese garden designer

Ji Cheng (simplified Chinese: 计成; traditional Chinese: 計成; 1582 – c. 1642) was a Ming dynasty garden designer.

Ji Cheng was born in the 10th year of the reign of the Wanli Emperor (1582) in Tongli, Wujiang County, Jiangsu province.

As a youth, Ji Cheng made a name for himself as a landscape painter and private garden designer, he admired two Northern Song painters: Guan Tong (关仝) and Jing Hao (荆浩).

During his lifetime, he designed numerous private gardens in Southern China. In his late years, he summarized his lifetime experience into a monograph on landscape design: (园冶), Yuanye: The Craft of Gardens, 1631.

Ji Cheng's Yuanye (园冶), is the first monograph dedicated to garden architecture in the world. His work has been translated into many languages.

Ji Cheng's thirty-five room former residence at Hueichuan Bridge, Tongli, is now a tourist attraction.

"The garden is created by the human hand, but should appear as if created by heaven."
