= Li Tang (painter) =

Chinese painter (1050–1130)

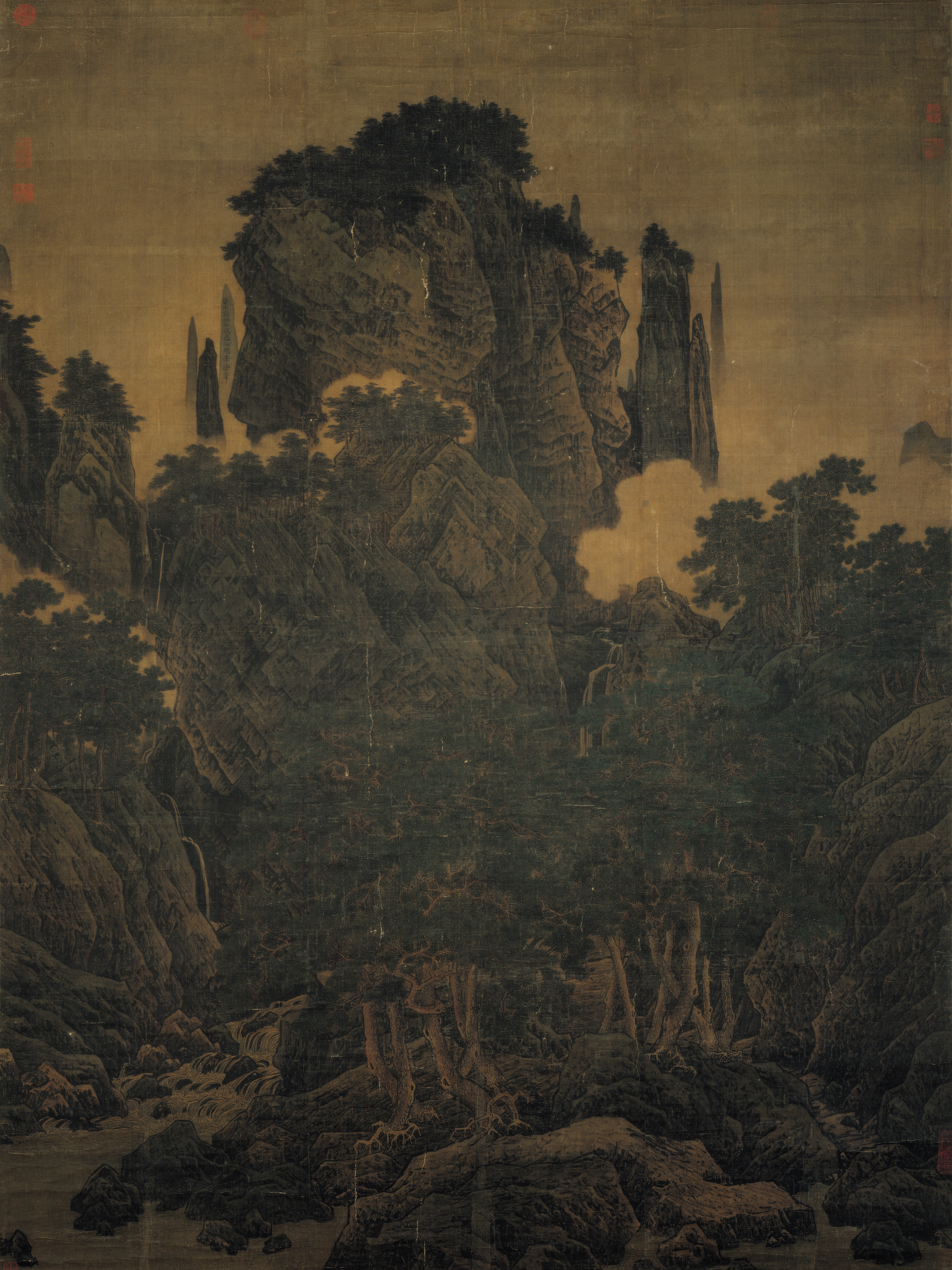
- Wind in the Pines Among a Myriad Valleys (1124)
- Born: ca.1050 China
- Died: 1130
- Known for: Painting
- Movement: Southern Song Dynasty

Li Tang (Chinese: 李唐; pinyin: Lǐ Táng; Wade–Giles: Li T'ang, courtesy name Xigu 晞古; c. 1050 – 1130) was a Chinese landscape painter who practised at Kaifeng and Hangzhou during both the Northern Song and Southern Song dynasty. He forms a link between earlier painters such as Guo Xi, Fan Kuan and Li Cheng and later artists such as Xia Gui and Ma Yuan. He perfected the technique of "axe-cut" brush-strokes and his style of painting became for what is regarded as the academy-style landscape of the Southern Song.

== Biography ==
Li Tang was born ca. 1050, a native of Heyang. Already in his early years he earned his living by painting. Sometime after 1100, under Emperor Huizong, he earned the highest rank in the Painting Academy at the court in Bianjing (now Kaifeng).

He survived the invasion by the Jurchen Jin dynasty in 1126–27, and, together with the court, moved to Qiantang (now Hangzhou), which became the capital city of the newly established Southern Song Dynasty. He continued to serve as painter in the court under Emperor Gaozong, and died circa 1130.

== Character of his art ==
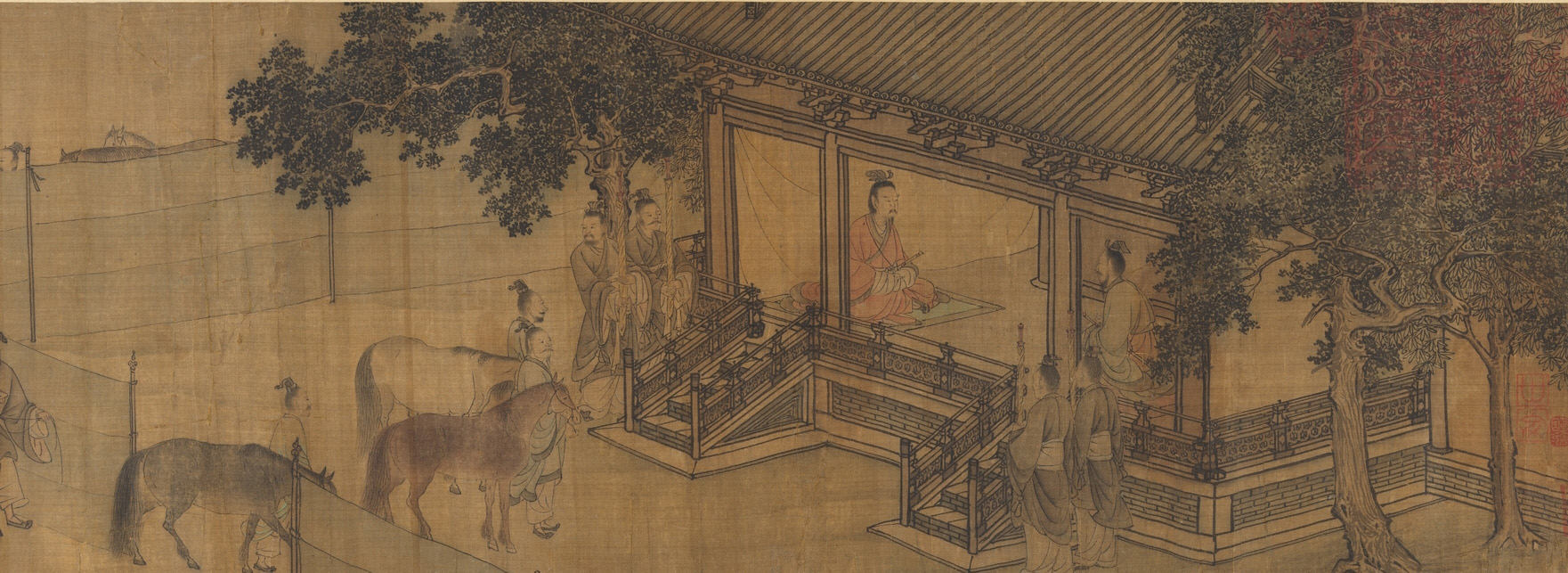
Duke Wen of Jin Recovering His State attributed to Li Tang (1140)

Li was among the most influential of the early Southern Song landscape artists and had many followers. He represented a vital link between the Northern Song school (Guo Xi, Fan Kuan, Li Cheng, and others), and the later Southern Song painters, such as Xia Gui and Ma Yuan, both of whom studied Li's art. He developed and perfected the technique of the so-called "ax-cut" brushstrokes, which gave rocks and mountains a particularly fine quality.

=== "Wind in Pines Among a Myriad Valleys" ===
As with most Song artists, few of Li Tang's paintings survive, and most are of questionable authorship. The large hanging scroll Wind in Pines Among a Myriad Valleys (also known as Whispering Pines in the Mountains; National Palace Museum, Taipei, Taiwan) is the only painting that bears a clear signature by the artist, which is placed on one of the peaks in the top section. It reads: "Painted by Li Tang of Ho-yang in Spring of the chia-ch'en year of the Hsüan-ho Reign of the Great Song [Dynasty]." The texture of the rocks in this painting is a standard example of the "ax-cut" strokes technique.

=== Other attributed works ===
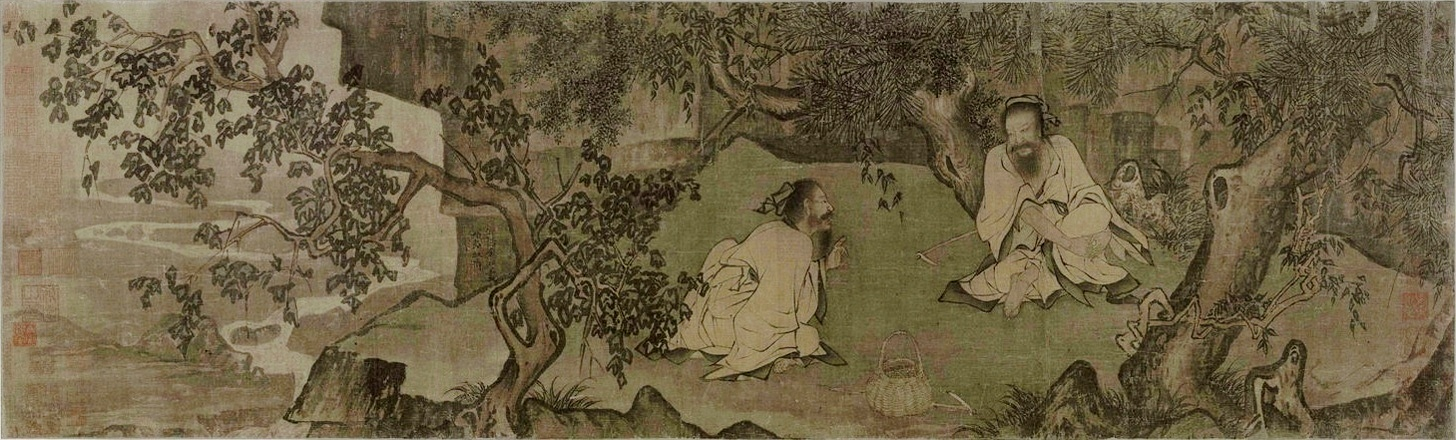
Li Tang, Gathering Wild Herbs, Palace Museum, Beijing

Other works commonly attributed to Li Tang are Intimate Scenery of River and Mountains, a long landscape scroll, and Sitting on Rocks Gazing at the Mist, both in the possession of the National Palace Museum.

== See also ==
- Chinese art
- Chinese painting
- Culture of the Song Dynasty
- History of Chinese art
