= Li Cheng (painter) =

Chinese painter

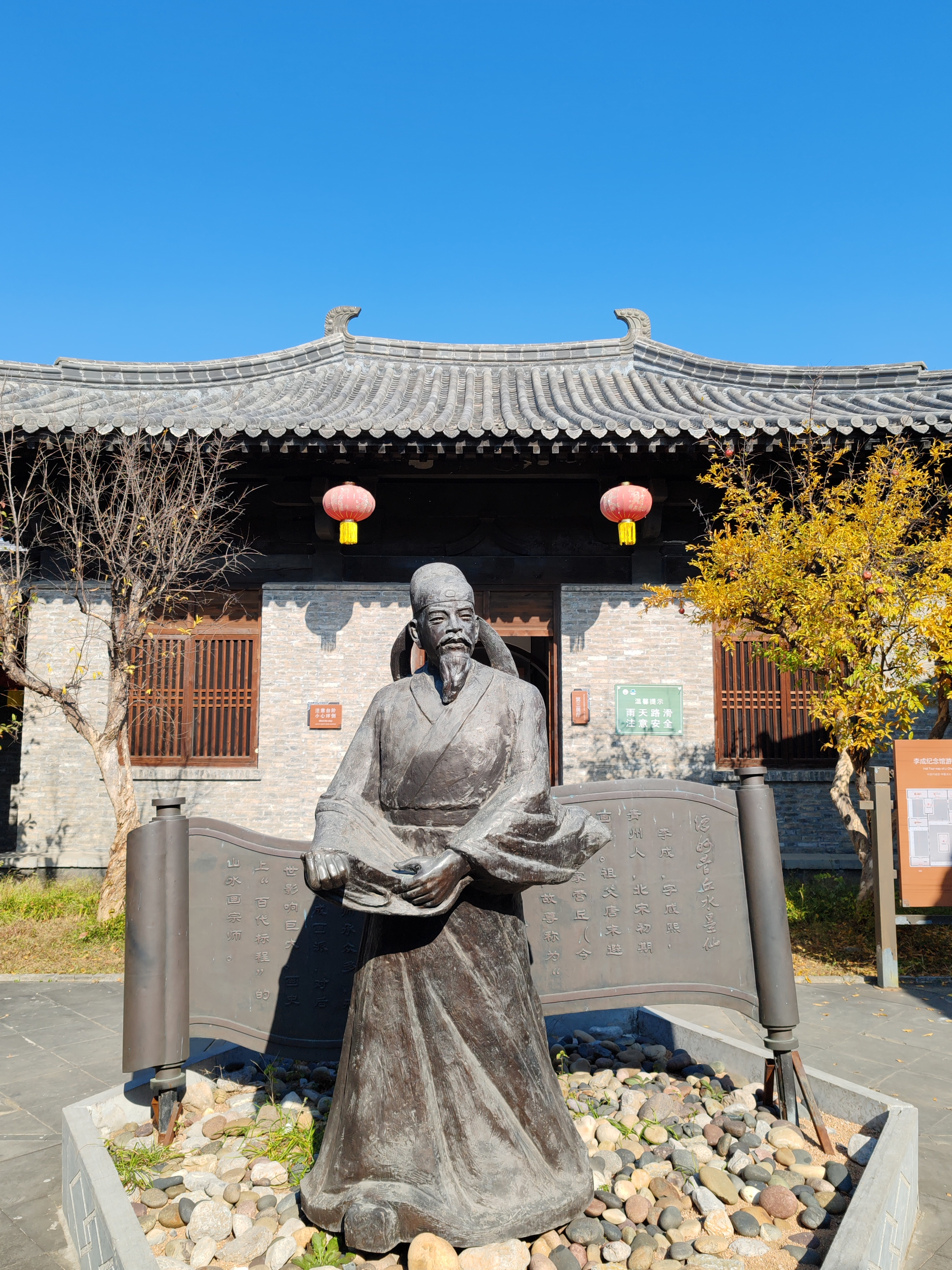
- Statue of Li Cheng in Qingzhou, Shandong
- Born: 919
- Died: 967
- Known for: Painting
- Movement: Northern Landscape style

Li Cheng (Chinese: 李成; pinyin: Lǐ Chéng; Wade–Giles: Li Ch'eng; 919–967), courtesy name Xiánxī (咸熙), was a Chinese painter of the Song dynasty. He was influenced by Jing Hao and Juran. Li Cheng, Fan Kuan, and Guan Tong became known as the "three great rival artists".

== Life ==
Li Cheng lived in Qingzhou (now part of Weifang, Shandong) during the Five Dynasties and Ten Kingdoms period and the early Song dynasty. He came from a family distinguished by scholarship and official conduct. His grandfather lived during the Huang Chao Rebellion of the 870s, and eventually the family fled during the tumultuous end period of the Tang dynasty.

He learned painting from Jing Hao and Guan Tong before turning to focus on nature and developing his own style. He was also a poet and literary stylist, but regarded these as secondary endeavors, and he did not seek government office. Many nobles sought out Li Cheng's services, but he never accepted. An official named Sun Anzhi desired a painting from Li Cheng so ardently, he offered Li a prestigious government post, but Li Cheng refused. Sun then paid an acquaintance of Li Cheng to steal a painting, earning the artist's lifelong enmity. During his later years, he took to travel and died in Huaiyang County.

Li Cheng did many landscape paintings with diluted ink, a technique called "treating ink like gold", which gives the appearance of a foggy dream world. In his day, he was considered the greatest landscape painter of all time. His paintings carried on an artistic dialogue with those of Wu Daoxuan. Li Cheng primarily portrayed the landscapes of Shandong. Artists of later generations, such as Guo Xi, modeled their teaching on his painting style and methods.

His works include "Jigger", "Joy in Fishing", "Cold crow", and "Landscape". One extant painting, "Reading Stele Nest Stone", was a collaboration with Wang Xiao.

== Art ==
Luxuriant Forest among Distant Peaks, detail, Liaoning Provincial Museum.

== See also ==
- Culture of the Song dynasty
- Chinese painting
- Chinese art
- History of Chinese art
