= Six Principles =

Six Principles can refer to:

- Six principles of Chinese painting established by Xie He in the 6th century.
- General Six-Principle Baptists, the oldest Baptist denomination in the Americas, dating to the 17th century.
- The six principles established by Global Greens Charter by 800 delegates from the Green parties of 70 countries in 2001.
