= Xie He =

Xie He is the name of:

- Xie He (artist), 6th century Chinese painter and art theorist
- Xie He (Go player) (born 1984)
