= Borrowed scenery =

Technique in east Asian garden design

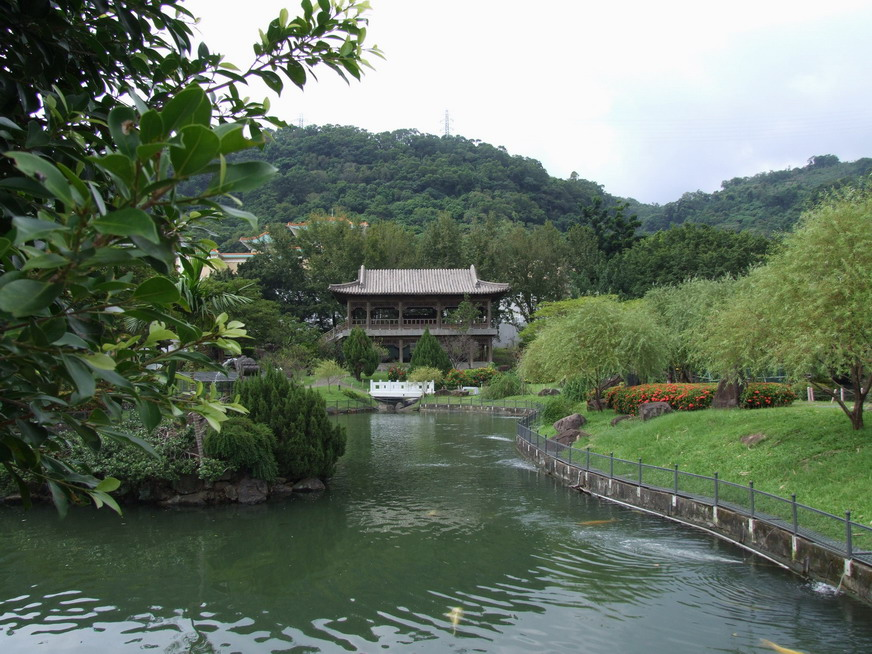
- Borrowed scenery in the style of Song and Ming Dynasty gardens located at the Zhishan Garden

Chinese name
- Chinese: 借景
Transcriptions
Standard Mandarin
- Hanyu Pinyin: jièjǐng

Japanese name
- Kanji: 借景
Transcriptions
- Romanization: shakkei

Borrowed scenery (借景; Japanese: shakkei; Chinese: jièjǐng) is the principle of "incorporating background landscape into the composition of a garden" found in traditional East Asian garden design. The term borrowing of scenery ("shakkei") is Chinese in origin, and appears in the 17th century garden treatise Yuanye.

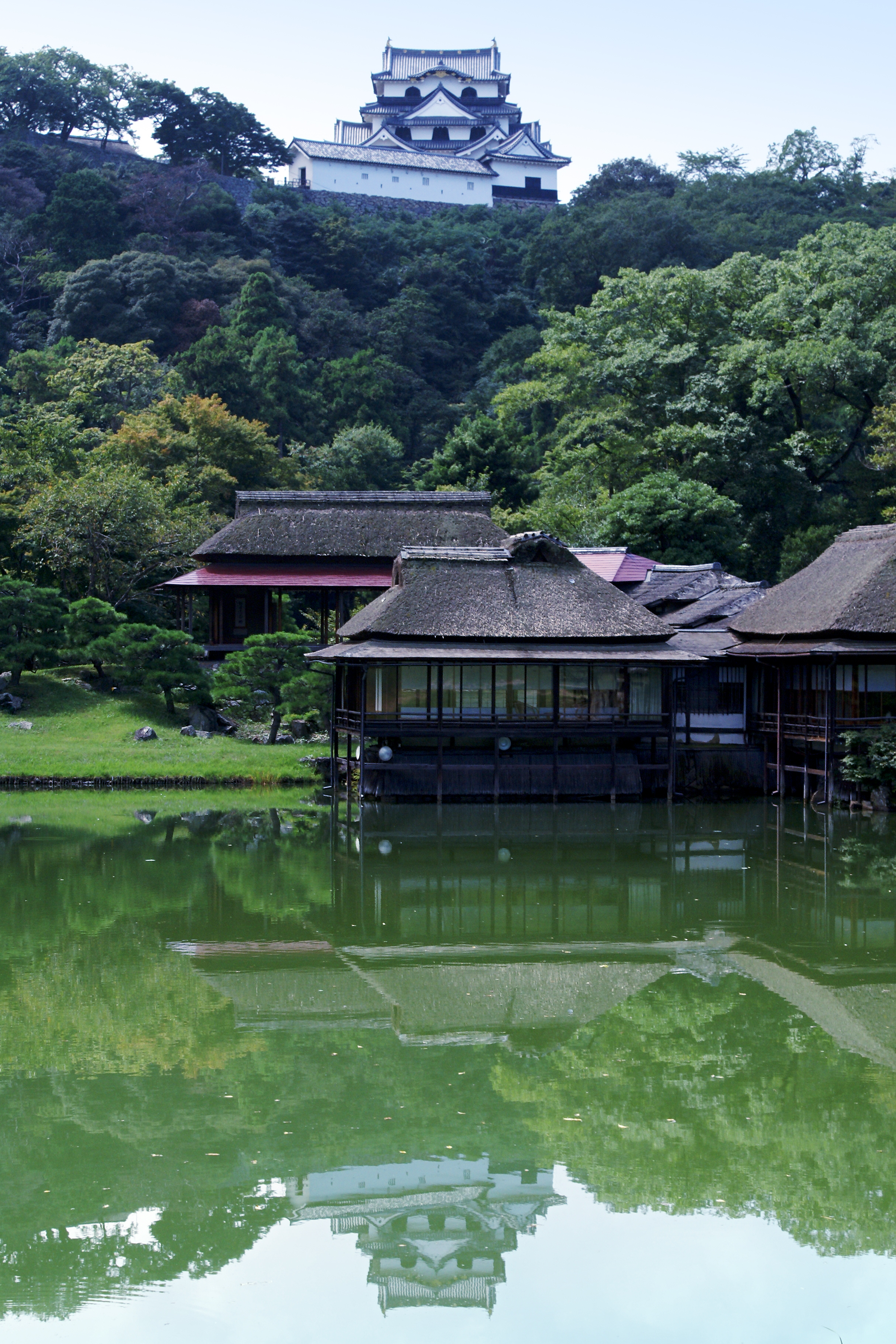
Shakkei example of Hikone Castle in the background of Genkyū Garden (玄宮園)

== Borrowed scenery in garden design ==
A garden that borrows scenery is viewed from a building and designed as a composition with four design essentials: 1) The garden should be within the premises of the building; 2) Shakkei requires the presence of an object to be captured alive as borrowed scenery, i.e. a view on a distant mountain for example; 3) The designer edits the view to reveal only the features they wish to show; and 4) The borrowed scenery is linked with and reflects the foreground of the garden.

== Chinese gardens that borrow scenery ==
- Humble Administrator's Garden, Suzhou
- Summer Palace, Beijing
- Master of the Nets Garden, Suzhou

== Japanese gardens that borrow scenery ==
- Murin-an garden, Kyoto
- Shugaku-in Imperial Villa, Kyoto
- Isuien Garden, Nara
- Ritsurin Garden, Takamatsu
- Genkyu-en, Hikone Castle
- Adachi Museum of Art, Yasugi
- Sengan-en, Kagoshima
- Joju-in garden, Kyoto

== Borrowed scenery and modernism ==
Borrowing scenery, as a technique of design was conceptualized in modernist architectural theory in the 1960s. This understanding was made explicit among Japanese architects, for whom it was the utmost effort to design continuity of interior and exterior space, a major topic in modernist architecture. Architects from the International Style in modern architecture acclaimed things like simplicity and space in Japanese architecture. Seen from the perspective of architecture theory borrowing scenery was seen as a fixed three-dimensional plasticity, whence shakkei is usually translated as "borrowed" scenery.

== Borrowed scenery in the Chinese garden manual Yuanye ==
According to the 1635 CE Chinese garden manual Yuanye (園冶), there are four categories of borrowed scenery, namely: yuanjie (遠借 "distant borrowing", e.g., mountains, lakes), linjie (隣借 "adjacent borrowing", neighboring buildings and features), yangjie (仰借 "upward borrowing", clouds, stars), and fujie (俯借 "downward borrowing", rocks, ponds). The Yuanye has a last chapter titled "Jiejing", "Borrowed Scenery". This chapter makes clear that borrowing scenery is not a single design idea but the essence of landscape design philosophy in its entirety. The ever-changing moods and appearances of landscape in full action are an independent function that becomes an agent for garden making. To be able to make a garden, the garden maker needs to meld with the landscape on the site. It is about the ecology of nature, including man that moves design. This extended meaning of borrowing scenery jiejing is recently getting attention in landscape architecture theory in China.

== Borrowed scenery and the Japanese garden manual Sakuteiki ==
The term borrowed scenery is not mentioned in the oldest extant Japanese garden manual, the Sakuteiki (作庭記; "Records of Garden Making"). However, this text, which is attributed to Tachibana Toshitsuna (橘俊綱, 1028–1094 CE), a son of the Byodoin's designer Fujiwara no Yorimichi (藤原頼通, 990–1074 CE), records as one of the first principles of garden making:

According to the lay of the land, and depending upon the aspect of the water landscape, you should design each part of the garden tastefully, recalling your memories of how nature presented itself for each feature. (tr. Inaji 1998:13)

Three principle tenets guiding Japanese garden organization are,

- shōtoku no sansui (生得の山水; "natural landscape") intending to create in the likeness of nature
- kohan ni shitagau (湖畔に従う; "follow the lakeshore") planning in accordance with the site topography
- fuzei (風情; "appearance; air") capturing and presenting the ambiance

Shakkei, which attempts to capture nature alive rather than create a less spectacular version, can be taken as to allude to the first of these categories.

The origins of an interest in the landscape outside the Heian period gardens, Shinden-zukuri gardens, lie in the increased local travel of the Japanese elite, a layered endeavor involving the bolstering of a national identity separate from China and the display of personal wealth. When they returned from their travels they would want to physically manifest these travels at home in a more ostentatious way than could be accomplished solely with art, weapons, or ceramics. Thus, borrowed scenery was introduced to incorporate the foreign landscapes seen in northern Japan into the southern cities of Nara and Kyoto.

== See also ==
- Japanese gardens
- Chinese garden

== Notes ==
- Wybe Kuitert Borrowing scenery and the landscape that lends - the final chapter of Yuanye, Journal of Landscape Architecture, 2015, 10:2, 32-43,
- Kuitert, Wybe (2015). "Borrowing scenery and the landscape that lends—the final chapter ofYuanye". Journal of Landscape Architecture. 10 (2): 32–43. Bibcode:2015JLaAr..10b..32K. doi:10.1080/18626033.2015.1058570. ISSN 1862-6033. S2CID 142773793.
- Slawson, David A. Secret Teachings in the Art of Japanese Gardens. New York: Kodansha International Ltd., 1987
- Takei, Jiro and Mark Peter Keane. The Sakuteiki: Visions of the Japanese Garden. North Clarendon, VT: Tuttle Publishing, 2001.
- Tsu, Frances Ya-sing. Landscape Design in Chinese Gardens. New York: McGraw-Hill Book Company, 1988.
