= Art history =

Academic study

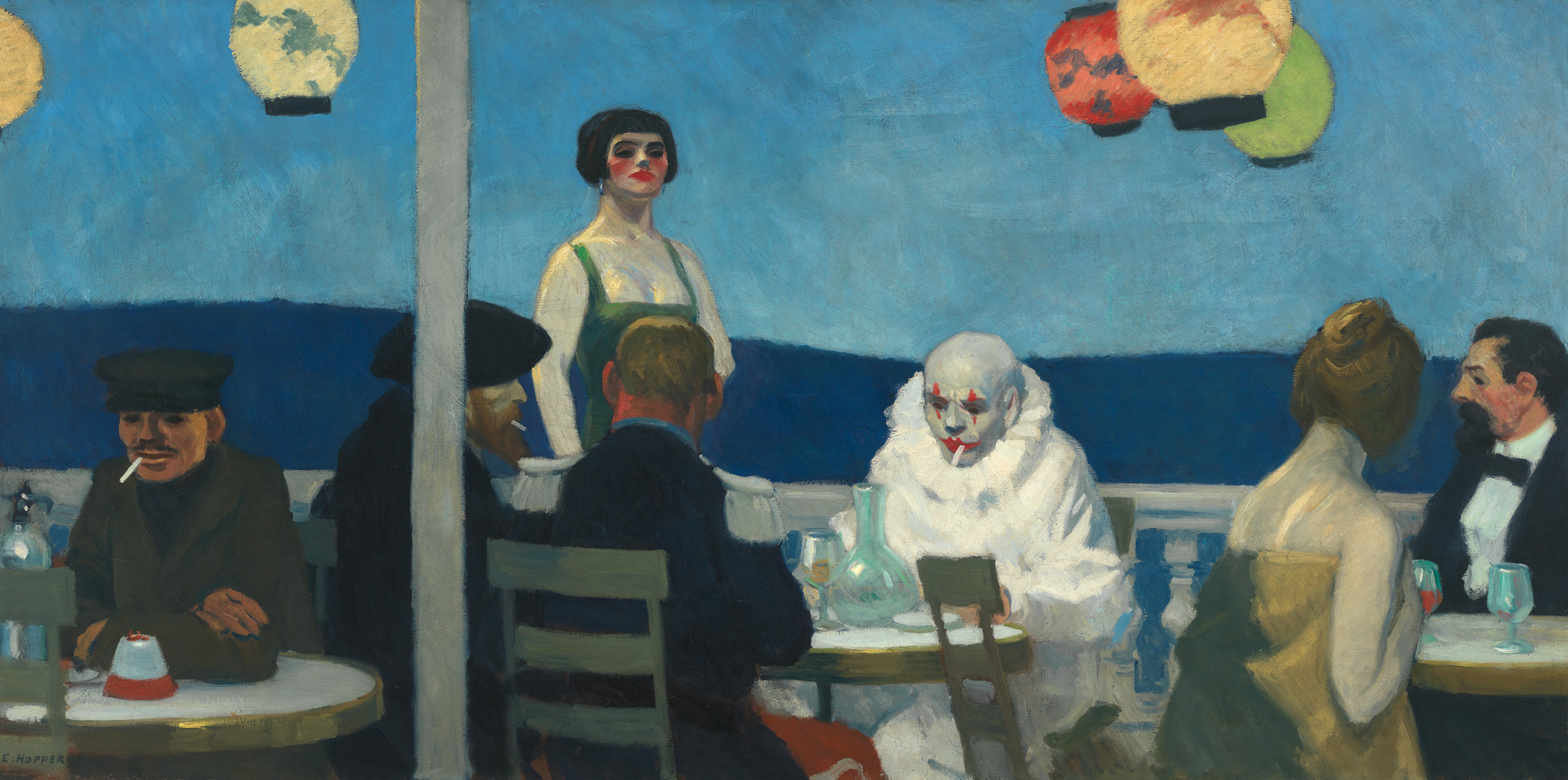
Soir Bleu by Edward Hopper, c.1914

Art history is an academic discipline devoted to the study of artistic production and visual culture throughout human history. Art historians employ historical methods or philosophies such as historical materialism or critical theory, to analyze artworks. They focus on the impact of art on societies and cultures, the relationship between art and politics, and how artistic styles and formal characteristics of works of art have changed throughout history. As a discipline, art history differs from art criticism, which is concerned with establishing a relative artistic value for critiquing individual works, and aesthetics, which is a branch of philosophy.

The study of art history emerged as a way to document and interpret artistic production. Early traditions of art-historical writing developed in several cultures, including Ancient Greece, Imperial China, and Renaissance Italy, each producing influential figures and approaches that shaped later scholarship. As an academic discipline, art history emerged in the 19th century and was a largely Eurocentric field, concentrating on Western definitions of the fine and decorative arts, particularly painting, drawing, sculpture, and architecture.

In the contemporary era, art history has expanded to examine broader aspects of visual culture, including the various cultural, political, and socioeconomic issues related to art. Today, art history is a broad academic field encompassing numerous methodologies and interdisciplinary approaches to the study of artistic production globally, including European, Asian, African, or American Indigenous arts, among others. Some of the subfields include Marxist art history, feminist art history, iconography and the study of symbols, visual culture studies, and design history.

== Methodologies ==
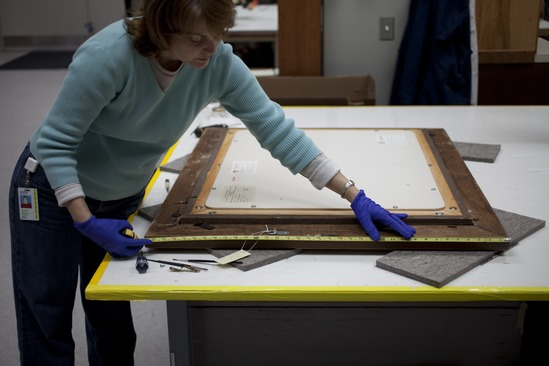
An conservation technician working on a painting. c. 2010

Art historians employ a number of methods in their research so they can examine work in the context of its time. This is professionally done in a manner which respects its creator's motivations and imperatives; with consideration of the desires and prejudices of its patrons and sponsors. A comparative analysis of themes and approaches of the creator's colleagues and teachers along with consideration of iconography and symbolism is part of the examination. This approach examines the work of art in the context of the world within which it was created.

Art historians also often examine work through an analysis of form; that is, the creator's use of line, shape, color, texture and composition. This approach examines how the artist uses a two-dimensional picture plane or the three dimensions of sculptural or architectural space to create their art. The way these individual elements are employed results in representational or non-representational art.

An analysis of iconography is a large branch of art history which focuses on particular design elements of an object. Through a close reading of such elements, it is possible to trace their lineage, and with it draw conclusions regarding the origins and trajectory of these motifs. In turn, it is possible to make any number of observations regarding the social, cultural, economic and aesthetic values of those responsible for producing the object.

Art historians may also work alongside or as art conservators, helping restore and conserve artworks. Conservation is a scientific field that is crucial to historians work, due to them needing to observe a work that is a condition good enough to be examined. Training in art conservation typically involves coursework in chemistry as well as the practice and history of art.

== Notable concentrations and fields of study ==
Most art historians choose a specific historical period within art history to specialize or gain an academic degree in. Concentrations on art movements, periods and certain fields such as Prehistoric art, Ancient art, Medieval art, Renaissance art, Romanticism, Realism, Modern art, Contemporary art, Pop art, Feminist art, Queer art, and much more are common in the academic world. These periods of art movements attempt to cover the broader aspect of art history while distinctively separating them.

=== Feminist art history ===
In the 1970s, Linda Nochlin's essay "Why Have There Been No Great Women Artists?" helped to ignite feminist art history and remains one of the most widely read essays about female artists. This was followed by a 1972 College Art Association Panel, chaired by Nochlin, entitled "Eroticism and the Image of Woman in Nineteenth-Century Art". Within a decade, scores of papers, articles, and essays sustained a growing momentum, fueled by the Second-wave feminist movement, of critical discourse surrounding women's interactions with the arts as both artists and subjects. In her pioneering essay, Nochlin applies a feminist critical framework to show systematic exclusion of women from art training, arguing that exclusion from practicing art as well as the canonical history of art was the consequence of cultural conditions which curtailed and restricted women from art producing fields. The few who did succeed were treated as anomalies and did not provide a model for subsequent success. Griselda Pollock is another prominent feminist art historian, whose use of psychoanalytic theory is described above.

While feminist art history can focus on any time period and location, much attention has been given to the Modern era. Some of this scholarship centers on the feminist art movement, which referred specifically to the experience of women. Often, feminist art history offers a critical "re-reading" of the Western art canon, such as Carol Duncan's re-interpretation of Les Demoiselles d'Avignon. Two pioneers of the field are Mary Garrard and Norma Broude. Their anthologies Feminism and Art History: Questioning the Litany, The Expanding Discourse: Feminism and Art History, and Reclaiming Feminist Agency: Feminist Art History After Postmodernism are substantial efforts to bring feminist perspectives into the discourse of art history. The pair also co-founded the Feminist Art History Conference.

=== Museum studies ===
Art historians are often employed by museums due to their expertise in the field. Galleries, and archives are places where art historians may be in charge of exhibits, research or collections, depending on specialization factors. Museum studies, including the history of museum collecting and display, is now a specialized field of study, as is the history of collecting.

== Timeline of prominent methods ==
=== Pliny the Elder and ancient precedents ===
The earliest surviving writing on art that can be classified as art history are the passages in Pliny the Elder's Natural History (c. AD 77–79), concerning the development of Greek sculpture and painting. From them it is possible to trace the ideas of Xenokrates of Sicyon (c. 280 BC), a Greek sculptor who was perhaps the first art historian. Pliny's work, while mainly an encyclopaedia of the sciences, has thus been influential from the Renaissance onwards. (Passages about techniques used by the painter Apelles c. (332–329 BC), have been especially well-known.) Similar, though independent, developments occurred in the 6th century China, where a canon of worthy artists was established by writers in the scholar-official class. These writers, being necessarily proficient in calligraphy, were artists themselves. The artists are described in the Six Principles of Painting formulated by Xie He.

=== Vasari and artists' biographies ===
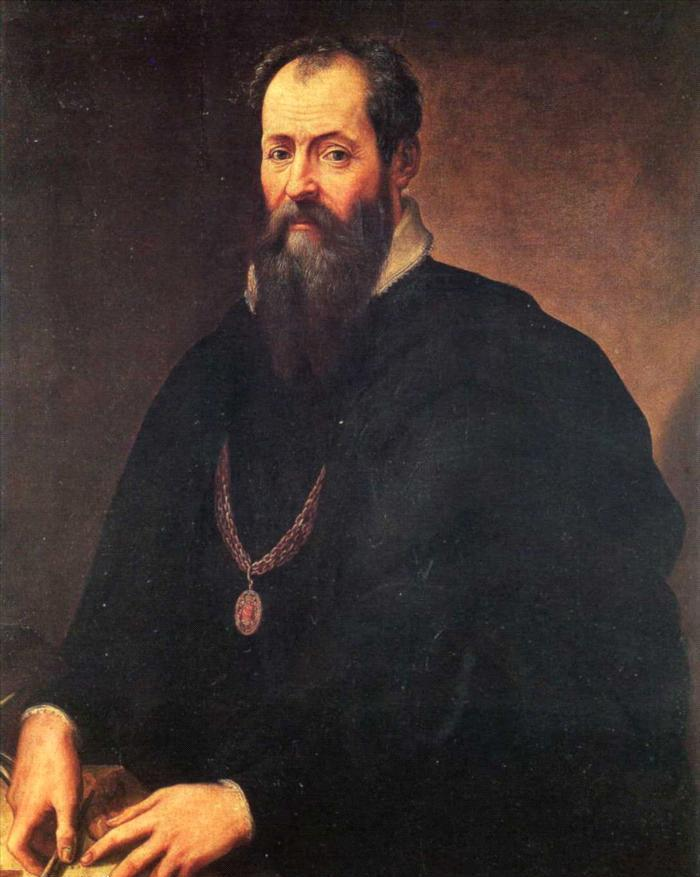
Giorgio Vasari, Self-portrait c. 1567

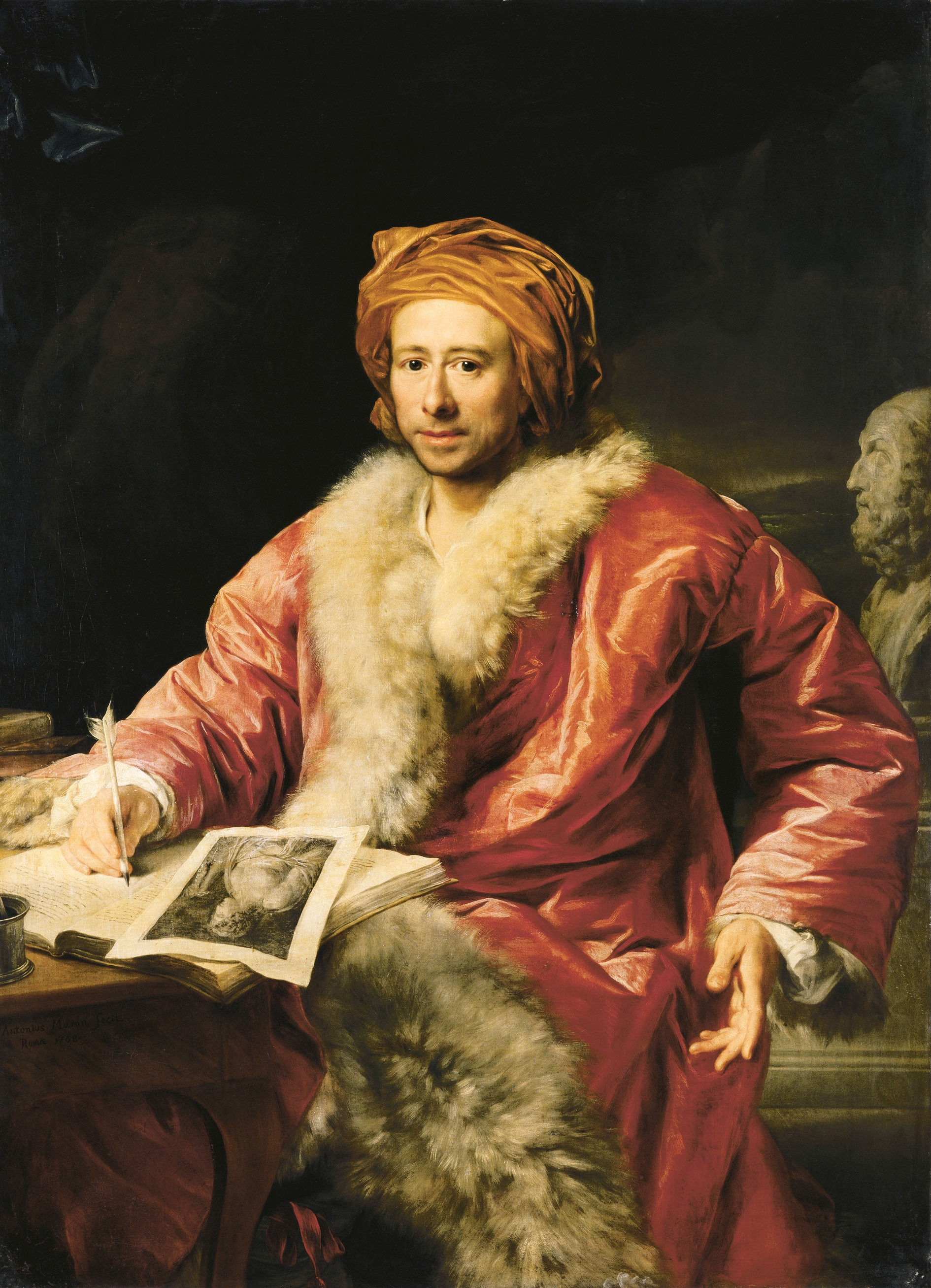
Anton von Maron, Portrait of Johann Joachim Winckelmann, 1768

Giorgio Vasari, a Tuscan painter, sculptor and author of the Lives of the Most Excellent Painters, Sculptors, and Architects, has been credited with writing the first true history of art. He emphasized art's progression and development, which was a milestone in this field. His work was a personal and a historical account, featuring biographies of individual Italian artists, many of whom were his contemporaries and personal acquaintances. The most renowned of these was Michelangelo.

Vasari's writings about art were enormously influential, and served as a model for many.

=== Winckelmann and art criticism ===
Scholars such as Johann Joachim Winckelmann (1717–1768) criticized Vasari's "cult" of artistic personality, and argued that the real emphasis in the study of art should be the views of the learned beholder and not the viewpoint of the artist. Winckelmann's writings thus were the beginnings of art criticism. His two most notable works that introduced the concept of art criticism were Gedanken über die Nachahmung der griechischen Werke in der Malerei und Bildhauerkunst (Reflections on the Painting and Sculpture of the Greeks), published in 1755, and Geschichte der Kunst des Altertums (History of Art in Antiquity), published in 1764 (this is the first occurrence of the phrase 'history of art' in the title of a book). Winckelmann critiqued the artistic excesses of Baroque and Rococo forms, and was instrumental in reforming taste in favor of Neoclassicism. Winckelmann's work marked the entry of art history into the high-philosophical discourse of German culture.

Winckelmann was read avidly by Johann Wolfgang von Goethe and Friedrich Schiller, both of whom began to write on the history of art, and his account of the Laocoön group occasioned a response by Lessing. The emergence of art as a major subject of philosophical speculation was solidified by the appearance of Immanuel Kant's Critique of Judgment in 1790, and was furthered by Hegel's Lectures on Aesthetics. Hegel's philosophy served as the direct inspiration for Karl Schnaase's work. Schnaase's Niederländische Briefe established the theoretical foundations for art history as an autonomous discipline, and his Geschichte der bildenden Künste, one of the first historical surveys of the history of art from antiquity to the Renaissance, facilitated the teaching of art history in German-speaking universities. Schnaase's survey was published contemporaneously with a similar work by Franz Theodor Kugler.

=== Wölfflin and stylistic analysis ===
Heinrich Wölfflin (1864–1945), who studied under Burckhardt in Basel, is considered to be one of the most influential scholars of modern art history. He introduced a scientific approach to the history of art, focusing on three concepts. Firstly, he attempted to study art using psychology, particularly by applying the work of Wilhelm Wundt. He argued, among other things, that art and architecture are good if they resemble the human body. For example, houses were good if their façades looked like faces. Secondly, he introduced the idea of studying art through comparison. By comparing individual paintings to each other, he was able to make distinctions of style. His book Renaissance and Baroque developed this idea, and was the first to show how these stylistic periods differed from one another. In contrast to Giorgio Vasari, Wölfflin was uninterested in the biographies of artists. He proposed the creation of an "art history without names." He also studied art based on ideas of nationhood. He was particularly interested in whether there was an inherently "Italian" and an inherently "German" style. This last interest was most fully articulated in his monograph on the German artist Albrecht Dürer.

=== Riegl, Wickhoff, and the Vienna School ===
In the late 19th century, a major school of art-historical thought developed at the University of Vienna. The first generation of the Vienna School was dominated by Alois Riegl and Franz Wickhoff, both students of Moritz Thausing, and was characterized by a tendency to reassess neglected or disparaged periods in the history of art. Riegl and Wickhoff both wrote extensively on the art of late antiquity, which before them had been considered as a period of decline from the classical ideal. Riegl also contributed to the revaluation of the Baroque.

The next generation of professors at Vienna included Max Dvořák, Julius von Schlosser, Hans Tietze, Karl Maria Swoboda, and Josef Strzygowski. A number of the most important twentieth-century art historians, including Ernst Gombrich, received their degrees at Vienna at this time. The term "Second Vienna School" (or "New Vienna School") usually refers to the following generation of Viennese scholars, including Hans Sedlmayr, Otto Pächt, and Guido Kaschnitz von Weinberg. These scholars began in the 1930s to return to the work of the first generation, particularly to Riegl and his concept of Kunstwollen, and attempted to develop it into a full-blown art-historical methodology. Sedlmayr, in particular, rejected the minute study of iconography, patronage, and other approaches grounded in historical context, preferring instead to concentrate on the aesthetic qualities of a work of art. As a result, the Second Vienna School gained a reputation for unrestrained and irresponsible formalism. This latter tendency was, however, by no means shared by all members of the school; Pächt, for example, was himself Jewish, and was forced to leave Vienna in the 1930s.

=== Panofsky and iconography ===
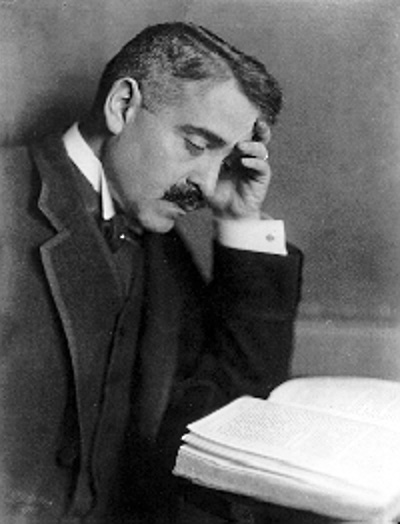
Photographer unknown, Aby Warburg c. 1900

In 1920, a group of scholars gathered in Hamburg to study Iconography. The most prominent among them were Erwin Panofsky, Aby Warburg, Fritz Saxl and Gertrud Bing. Together they developed much of the vocabulary that continues to be used in the 21st century by art historians. "Iconography"—with roots meaning "symbols from writing" refers to subject matter of art derived from written sources—especially scripture and mythology. "Iconology" is a broader term that referred to all symbolism, whether derived from a specific text or not. Today art historians sometimes use these terms interchangeably.

Panofsky, in his early work, also developed the theories of Riegl, but became eventually more preoccupied with iconography, and in particular with the transmission of themes related to classical antiquity in the Middle Ages and Renaissance. In this respect his interests coincided with those of Warburg, the son of a wealthy family who had assembled a library in Hamburg, devoted to the study of the classical tradition in later art and culture. Under Saxl's auspices, this library was developed into a research institute, affiliated with the University of Hamburg, where Panofsky taught.

Warburg died in 1929, and in the 1930s Saxl and Panofsky, both Jewish, were forced to leave Hamburg. Saxl settled in London, bringing Warburg's library with him and establishing the Warburg Institute. Panofsky settled in Princeton at the Institute for Advanced Study. In this respect they were part of an extraordinary influx of German art historians into the English-speaking academy in the 1930s. These scholars were largely responsible for establishing art history as a legitimate field of study in the English-speaking world, and the influence of Panofsky's methodology, in particular, determined the course of American art history for a generation.

=== Marxism and the Frankfurt School ===
By the Mid-20th Century, the ideas of Marxism began to spread rapidly throughout Europe along with a further inquiry of the history of art. The Frankfurt School, using critical theory, were influential figures in the advancement of studying art. Along with Marxists before the 1920s, such as Georgi Plekhanov and Friedrich Engels, using historical materialism, to analyze the development of the arts within society.

Within the Frankfurt School, philosopher Walter Benjamin, wrote his 1935 essay "The Work of Art in the Age of Mechanical Reproduction", in which Benjamin argued that an "aura" is found within artworks: its original presence in time and space. He suggests a work of art's aura is in a state of decay because it is becoming more and more difficult to apprehend the time and space in which a piece of art is created. Benjamin's theory closely relates to Affect theory.

Class society has also been a foundation for studying the development of the arts. In the early 20th Century and late 19th, historical materialism was an active theory of history that was beginning to gain traction, and still to this day is used worldwide by art historians. Georgi Plekhanov is considered to be a pioneer in progressing the use of materialist thinking within the study of art. His work "Historical Materialism and the Arts" written in 1899, describes how historical materialism can be used against an idealist conclusion of art to reach a clearer outlook on the topic. Marxists, like Plekhanov, argue that while artistic periods and revolutions obey their own logic, ultimately art is confined within the limits of the mode of production. Importantly, Marxists believe that the ideas in society, including art, are an expression of one or another of the contending classes existing in that mode of production.

== Professional organizations ==
In the United States, one of the most important art history organizations is the College Art Association. It organizes an annual conference and publishes the Art Bulletin and Art Journal. Similar organizations exist in other parts of the world, as well as for specializations, such as architectural history and Renaissance art history. In the UK, for example, the Association of Art Historians is the premiere organization, and it publishes a journal titled Art History.

== See also ==
- Bildwissenschaft
- Dictionary of Art Historians, a database of notable art historians maintained by Duke University
- Fine art
- Rock art
- Theosophy and visual arts
- Giorgio Vasari, art historian

== Notes and references ==
Sources

- Nelson, Robert S.; Shiff, Richard, eds. (2003). Critical Terms for Art History (2nd ed.). Chicago: University of Chicago Press. ISBN 978-0226571683.
