= Six laws =

Six laws 六法, a multivalent Chinese term, might refer to:

- the lost chapter of the Book of Lord Shang, partially known from quotations
- Six Yogas of Naropa
- Six principles of Chinese painting by Xie He
- Six Codes of law in East Asian countries
