= Dong Yuan =

Chinese artist (932–962)

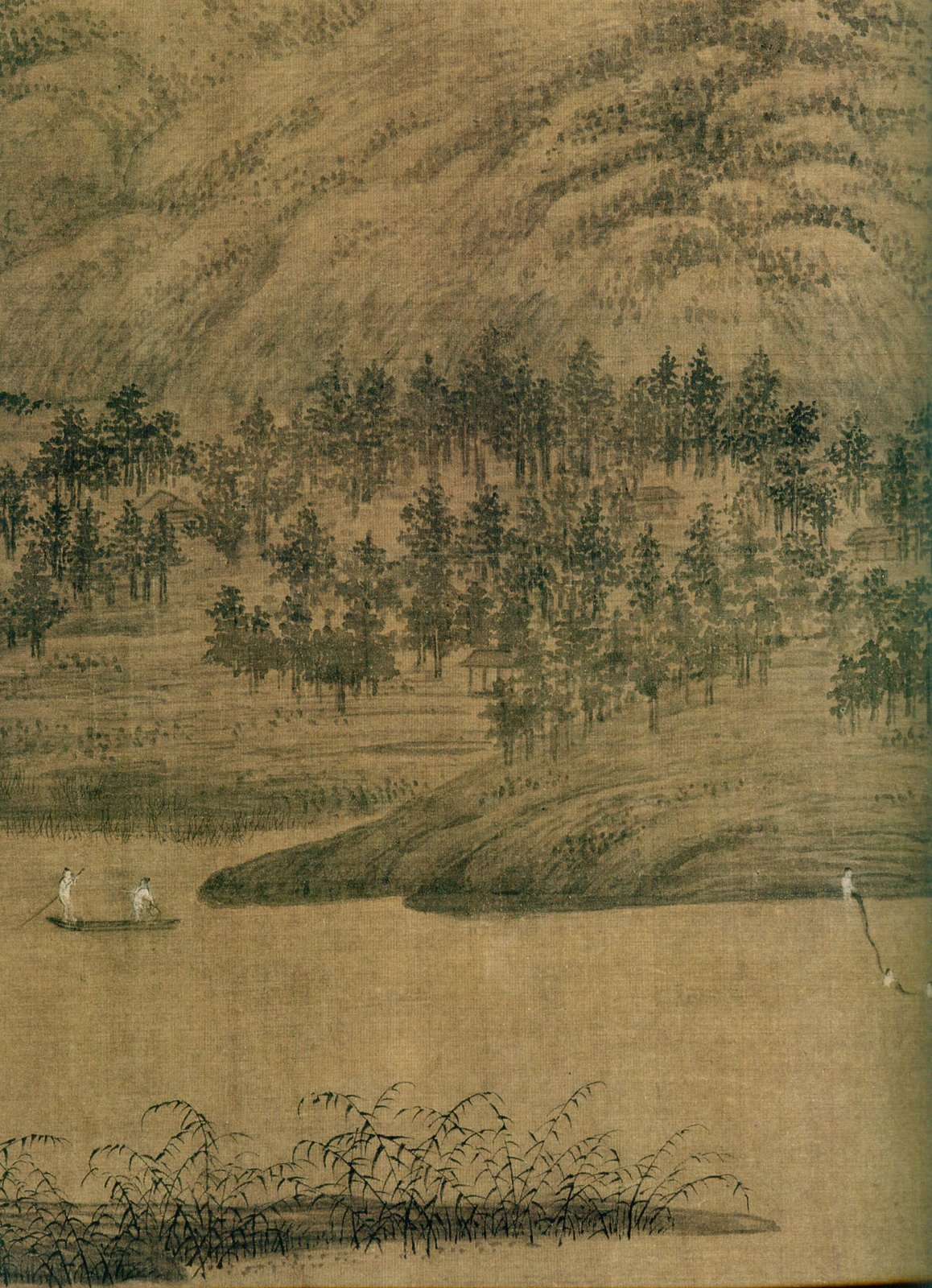
- Detail from Xiao and Xiang Rivers, permanent collection at the Palace Museum. This painting is often considered to be one of Dong Yuan's greatest masterpieces, and it "illustrates the revolutionary impressionism" he had achieved by "means of broken ink washes and the elimination of the outline."
- Born: c. 932; Zhongling, Yang Wu
- Died: c. 962; Southern Tang
- Known for: Painting
- Movement: Southern Tang, Jiangnan style

Dong Yuan (Chinese: 董源; pinyin: Dǒng Yuán; Wade–Giles: Tung Yüan; Gan: dung3 ngion4; c. 934 – c. 962), courtesy name Shuda (叔達), was a Chinese painter of the Southern Tang dynasty.

He was born in Zhongling (钟陵; present-day Jinxian County, Jiangxi Province). Dong Yuan was active in the Southern Tang, a dynasty of the Five Dynasties and Ten Kingdoms period. He was from Nanjing, which was a center for culture and the arts.

He was known for both figure and landscape paintings, and exemplified the elegant style which would become the standard for brush painting in China for the next nine centuries. He and his pupil Juran (巨然) were the founders of the Southern style of landscape painting, known as the Jiangnan Landscape style. Together with Jing Hao and Guan Tong of the Northern style they constituted the four seminal painters of that time.

As with many artists in China, his profession was as an official, here he studied the existing styles of Li Sixun and Wang Wei. However, he added to these masters' techniques; he included more sophisticated perspective.

== Works ==
The Xiao and Xiang Rivers or Scenes along the Xiao and Xiang Rivers, a painting on silk (49.80 cm by 141.30 cm), is one of his best-known masterpieces. It demonstrates his exquisite techniques, and his sense of composition. The clouds break the background mountains into a central pyramid composition and a secondary pyramid, by softening the mountain line, he makes the immobile effect more pronounced.

The inlet by breaking the landscape into groups makes the serenity of the foreground more pronounced, instead of simply being a border to the composition, it is a space of its own, into which the boat on the far right intrudes, even though it is tiny compared to the mountains. Left of center, he uses his unusual brush stroke techniques, later copied in countless paintings, to give a strong sense of foliage to the trees, which contrasts with the rounded waves of stone that make up the mountains themselves. This gives the painting a more distinct middle ground, and makes the mountains have an aura and distance which gives them greater grandeur and personality. He also used "face like" patterns in the mountain on the right. A painting attributed to Dong Yuan, The Riverbank, is housed in the Metropolitan Museum of Art, and was a gift from New York financier Oscar Tang, though some scholars believe it may be a modern forgery by Zhang Daqian.

== Gallery ==
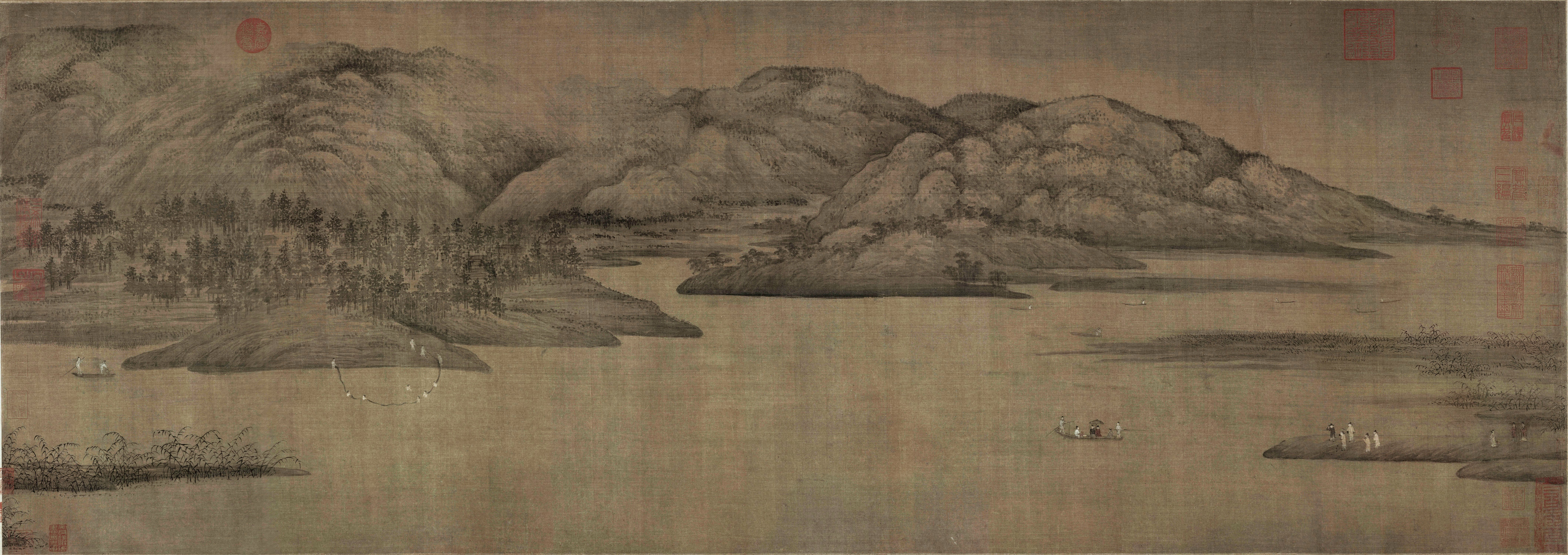
Xiao and Xiang Rivers (潇湘图). Part of a handscroll, ink and color on silk, Palace Museum, Beijing.

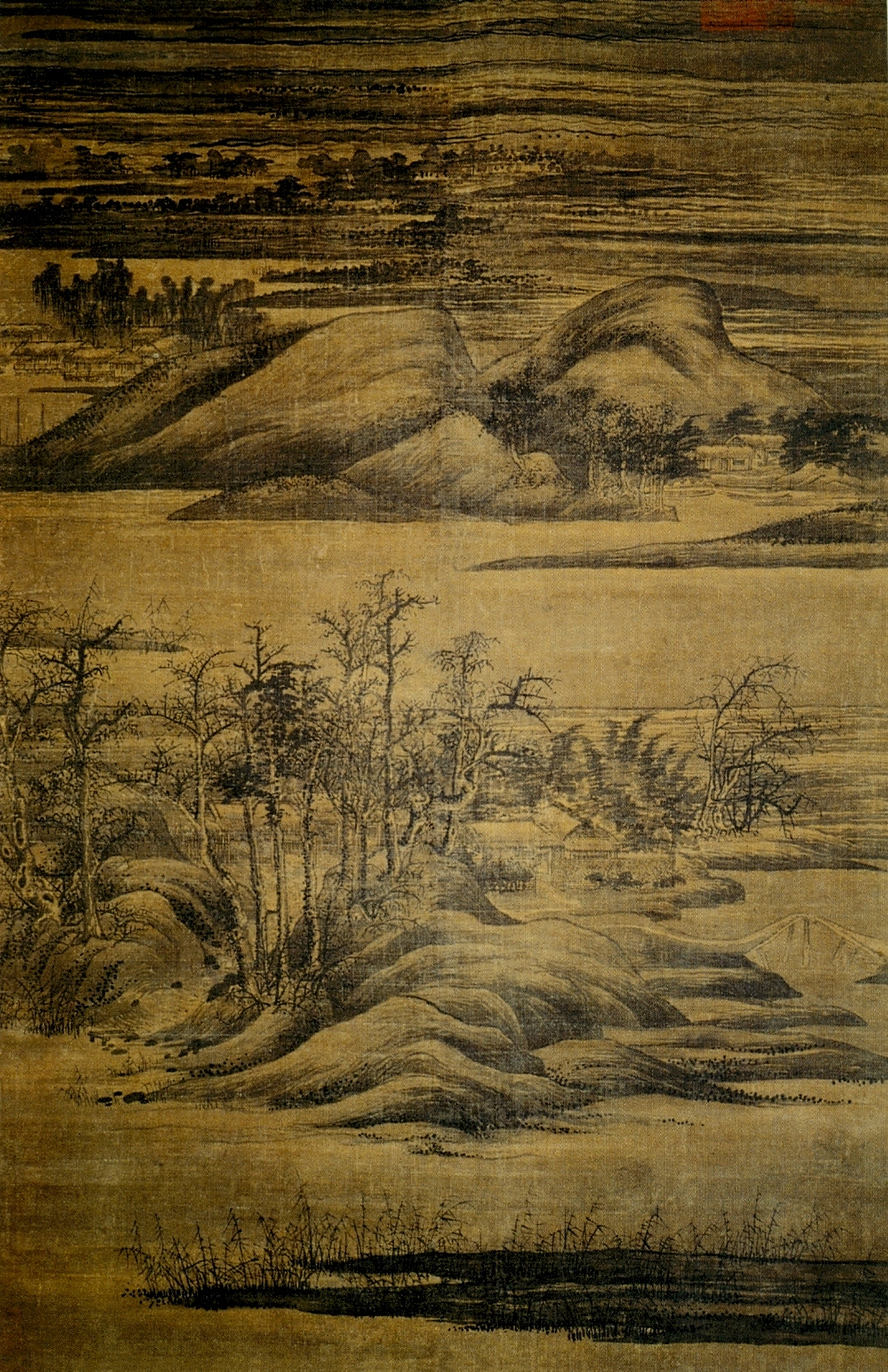
Wintry Groves and Layered Banks, ca. 950. Hanging Scroll, ink and color on silk, Kurokawa Institute, Japan.

Dongtian Mountain Hall (洞天山堂图). National Palace Museum, Taipei.

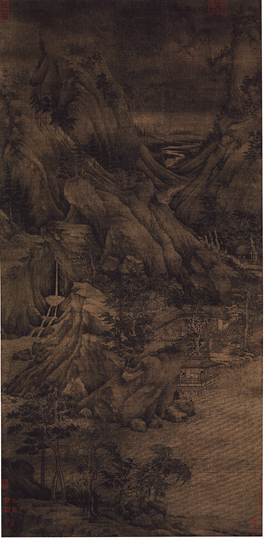
Along the Riverbank or The Riverbank at the Metropolitan Museum of Art.

== See also ==
- Culture of the Song Dynasty
- Chinese painting
- Chinese art
- Eight Views of Xiaoxiang
- History of Chinese art
- Xiaoxiang
- Xiaoxiang poetry
