= The Craft of Gardens =

1631 work on garden design by Ji Chen of the late Ming dynasty

Chinese name
- Traditional Chinese: 園冶
- Simplified Chinese: 园冶
Transcriptions
Standard Mandarin
- Hanyu Pinyin: Yuán Yě

Japanese name
- Kanji: 園冶
- Hiragana: えんや
Transcriptions
- Romanization: En'ya

Yuanye (Chinese: 園冶), variously translated as The Garden Treatise or The Craft of Gardens, is a 1631 work on garden design by Ji Cheng of the late Ming dynasty. It is now considered the definitive work on garden design of the many produced during that period, and has been labeled as the first monograph dedicated to garden architecture in the world, and among the great masterpieces of garden literature.

== Structure ==
The work is broken into three volumes. Volume one focuses on overall principles, in particular: situation, layout, buildings and their fittings. Volume two contains descriptions and illustrations of decorative balustrades. Volume three covers doorways, windows, walls, decorative pavements, artificial mounds, rock selection, and a final chapter, chapter ten on borrowed scenery (jie jing).

== Emphasis ==
The work is primarily focused on architectural features, rather than natural features. Contrasts have been drawn between this and other classic works of East Asian garden design, such as Sakuteiki (of the Japanese Heian period) which concentrates on water and rocks, and numerous Japanese works of the Edo period (Tsukiyama teizoden, Sagaryuniwa kohohiden no koto, Tsukiyama sansuiden), to suggest a fundamental difference in approach between Chinese and Japanese garden design - namely, emphasis on architectural and natural features, respectively. However in face of a more advanced understanding of the last, conclusive chapter ten of the book it is clear that natural features are in fact the prime theme of Yuanye.

== Last Chapter Ten: Jie jing ==
The title of the last chapter of Yuanye is Jie jing 借景, borrowing scenery. The text presents jie jing not as a single design idea of borrowing scenery as is usually believed. Rather it deals with the essence of landscape design philosophy in its entirety. The ever-changing moods and appearances of landscape in full action are understood by the author as an independent function that becomes an agent for garden making. The object and subject, as either the landscape or the garden maker, shift continuously moving towards the conclusion: landscape and garden maker are both object and subject and are interchangeable. To be able to make a garden, the garden maker needs to meld with the landscape on the site, while natural phenomena become mnemonics for common knowledge as expressed in well-known passages in classic literature or poetry. It is the ecology of nature, including man, which motivates and moves design.

== See also ==
- Chinese garden

== Bibliography ==
- Ji Cheng: Craft of Gardens, Yale University Press, 1988, Translated by Alison Hardie ISBN 0-300-04182-9
- Yuanye, le traite du jardin, Ji Cheng, Traduit par Che Bing Chiu ISBN 2-910735-13-3
- The Garden as Architecture. Inaji, Toshiro. 1998. ISBN 4-7700-1712-X
- Wybe Kuitert: Borrowing scenery and the landscape that lends - the final chapter of Yuanye Journal of Landscape Architecture 2015, 10:2, 32-43,
