= Xie He (artist) =

Chinese art historian

Xie He (simplified Chinese: 谢赫; traditional Chinese: 謝赫; pinyin: Xiè Hè; Wade–Giles: Hsieh He; fl. 6th century) was a Chinese art historian, art critic, painter, and writer of the Liu Song and Southern Qi dynasties. He is known for the "six principles of Chinese painting", which was found in the preface to his book The Record of the Classification of Old Painters (古畫品錄).

== Six principles of Chinese Painting ==
According to Xie He, the six elements that define a painting are:

1. "Spirit Resonance" (qiyun 气韵) or vitality (shengdong 生动), and seems to translate to the nervous energy transmitted from the artist into the work. The overall energy of a work of art. Xie He said that without Spirit Resonance, there was no need to look further.
2. "Bone Method" (gufa 骨法) or the way of using the brush (yongbi 用笔). This refers not only to texture and brush stroke, but also to the close link between handwriting and personality. In his day, the art of calligraphy was inseparable from painting.
3. "Correspondence to the Object" (yingwu 应物) or the depicting of form (xiangxing 象形), which would include shape and line.
4. "Suitability to Type" (suilei 随类) or the application of color (fucai 赋彩), including layers, value and tone.
5. "Division and Planning" (jingying 经营) or placing and arrangement (weizhi 位置), corresponding to composition, space and depth.
6. "Transmission by Copying" (chuanyi 传移) or the copying of models (moxie 模写), not only from life but also the works of antiquity.
