= Guan Tong =

Chinese painter

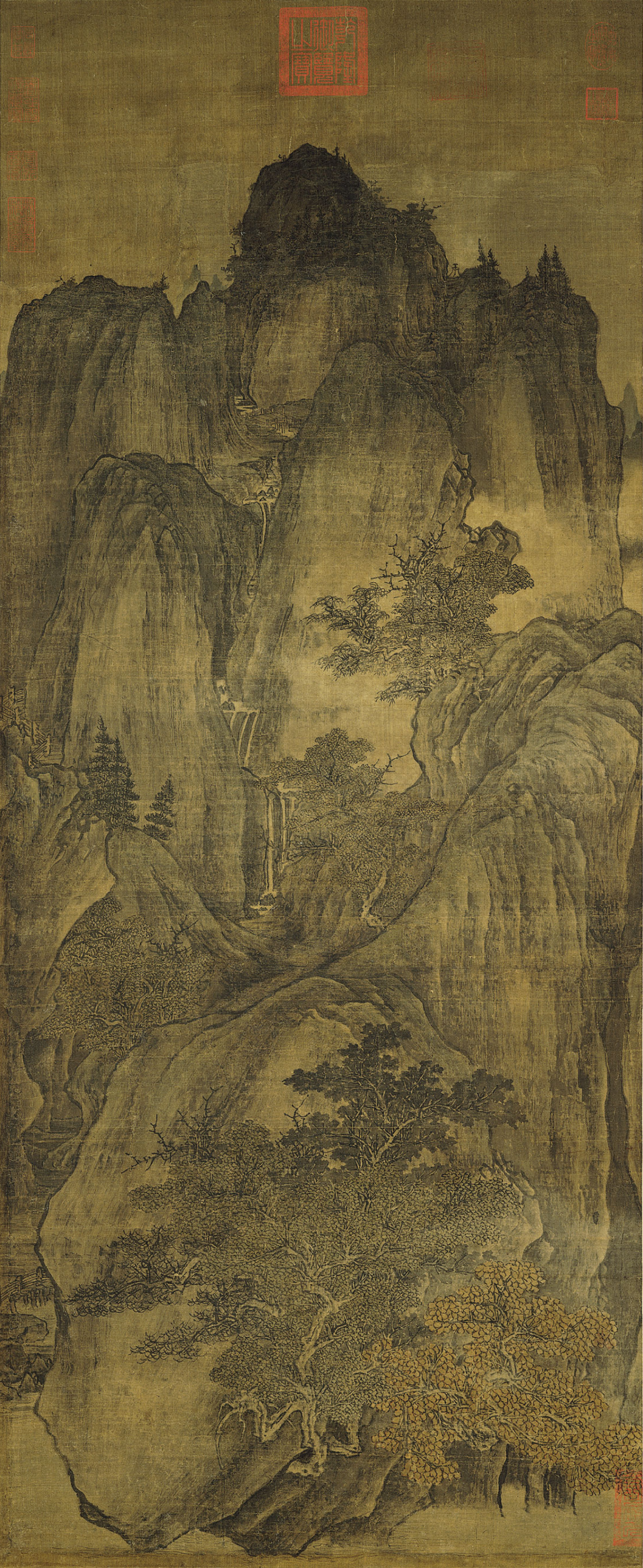
- Guan Tong's Autumn Mountain Shadow. Light color on silk. National Palace Museum, Taipei, Taiwan
- Known for: Painting
- Movement: Northern Landscape style

Guan Tong (simplified Chinese: 关仝; traditional Chinese: 關仝; pinyin: Guān Tóng; Wade–Giles: Kuan T'ung) (c. 906-960) was a Chinese painter of the Northern Landscape style during the Five Dynasties and Ten Kingdoms period and early Song dynasty from the city of Chang'an. He was a pupil of Jing Hao, and known as a critical figure in the development of the era's monumental landscape painting. His landscape paintings achieved a believable and compelling portrayal of the natural world, an achievement typifying the tenth-century artists drive in the portrayal of nature. The great popularity Guan's distinctive style achieved is one measure of the popularity of landscape painting at the time.

Autumn Mountain Shadow is one of the paintings attributed to Guan Tong, and although there are several works attributed to him, there are no extant works bearing his signature. In this picture a barely visible steep path climbs through the rugged mountains. The work appears to be the visual equivalent of the poems describing hard journeys such as Li Bai's The Road to Shu is Hard (Shudao nan). Guan's works focus also on the representation of the cyclical seasons of nature: a concept central to Chinese medicine and many schools of Chinese philosophy.

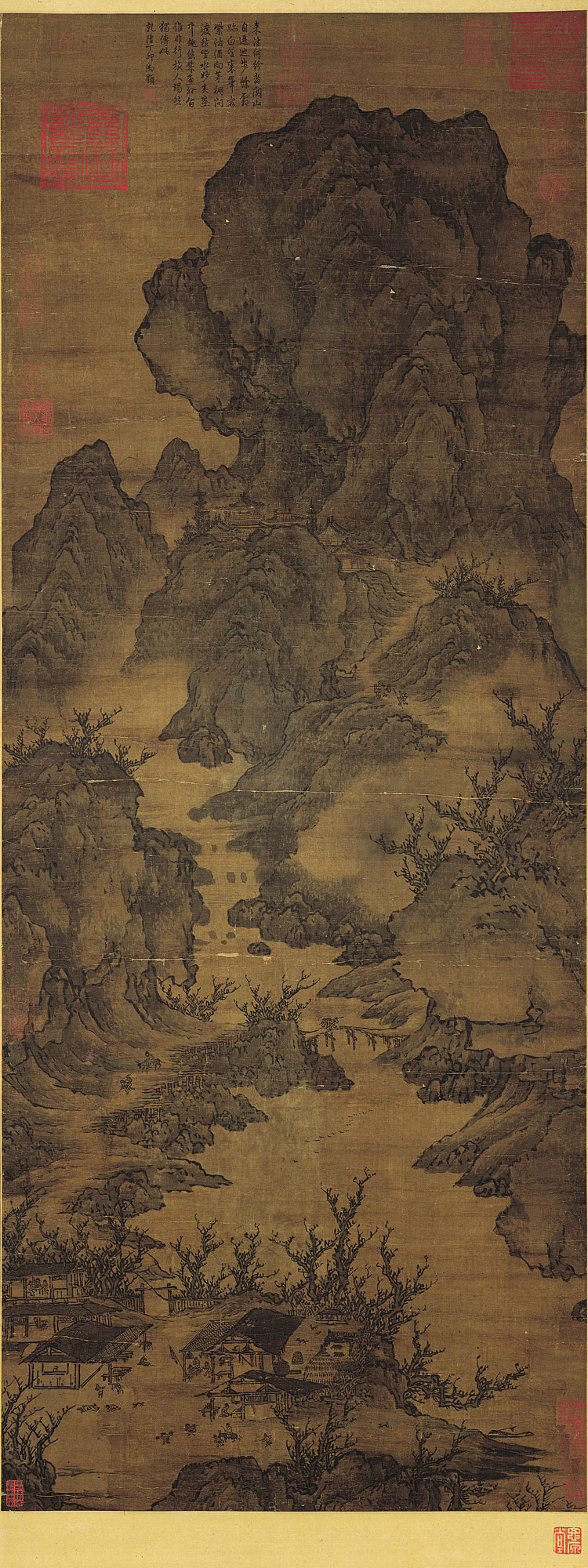
Passing Through Mountains Silk hanging scroll (56.8 x 144.4 cm) National Palace Museum, Taipei

Guan Tong favored the use of 'axe chopped' brushstrokes, Fu Pi Cun, to depict the angular rocky forms of the northern mountains. His strong peaks and densely compacted composition represents the northern tradition in its most likely form as scholars understand it today. Scholars describe Guan's works, along with certain pieces by his teacher Jing Hao, as advanced and impressive pieces for their era, and not works that should be counted as inferior or preliminary to the mature landscape art of the Song.

"Mid-Spring Goldleaf" in the Temple of Hangzhou is another work thought to have been created by Guan, though some have attributed it to Dai Li instead.

Twentieth-century artist Chang Dai-chien forged a painting which was successfully passed off as an original by Guan Tong; the painting was purchased by the Museum of Fine Arts, Boston in 1957 and was assumed, at the time, to be a work by Guan Tong. The painting is considered one of Chang's most ambitious and audacious forgeries.
