= Fan Kuan =

Song dynasty Chinese landscape painter

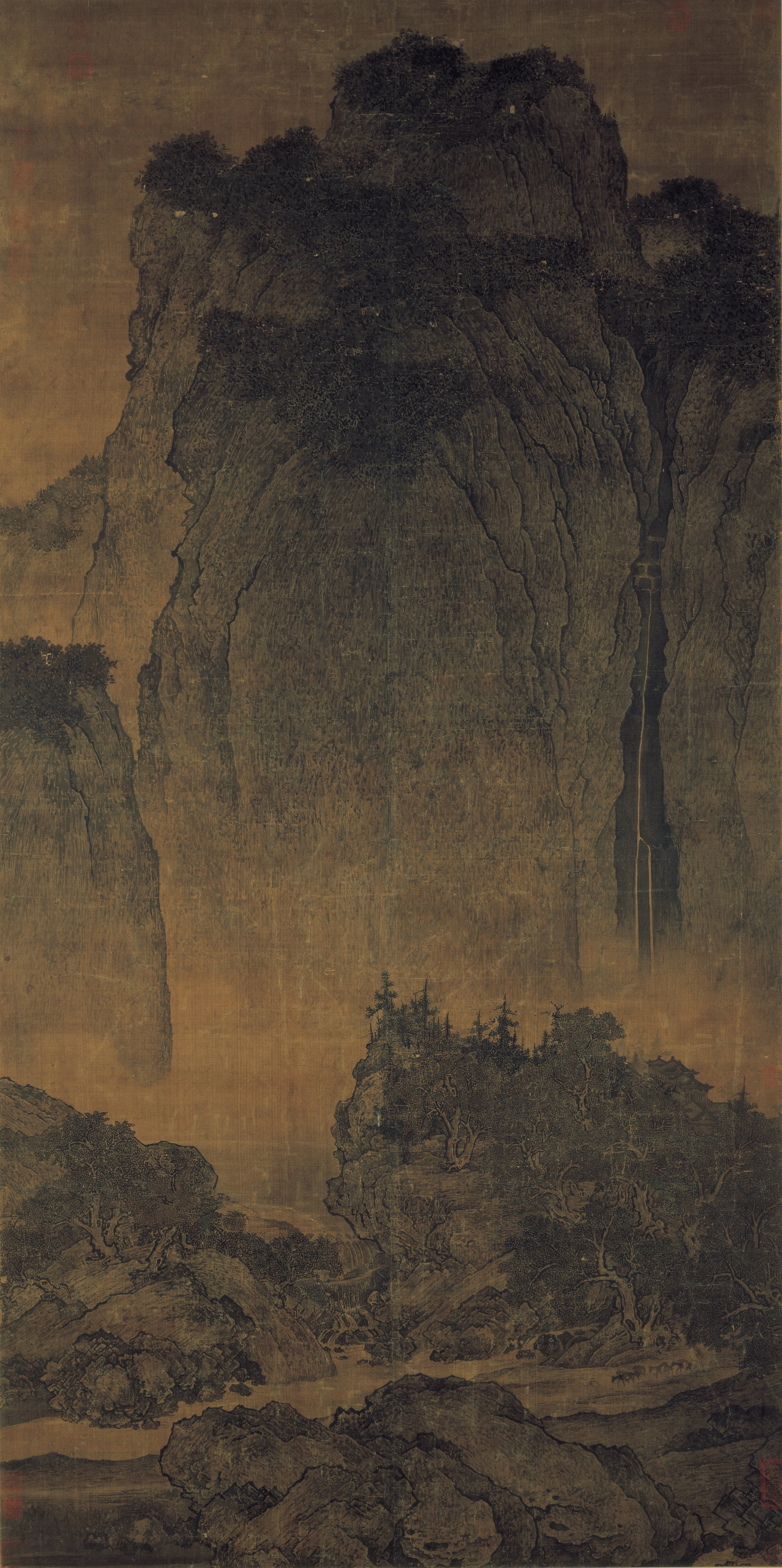
- Travelers among Mountains and Streams (谿山行旅), ink and slight color on silk, size 6¾ ft x 2½ ft. National Palace Museum, Taipei
- Born: c. 960; Hua-yuan (Today: Yaozhou District), Shaanxi Province
- Died: c. 1030
- Known for: Landscapes
- Movement: Northern Landscape style

Fan Zhongzheng (c. 960 – c. 1030), courtesy name Zhongli, better known by his pseudonym Fan Kuan (Chinese: 范寬; pinyin: Fàn Kuān; Wade–Giles: Fan K’uan), was a Chinese landscape painter of the Song dynasty. He was both a Daoist and a Neo-Confucianist.

Travelers among Mountains and Streams, a large hanging scroll, is Fan Kuan's best known work, possibly his only surviving one, and a seminal painting of the Northern Song school. It establishes an ideal in monumental landscape painting to which later painters were to return time and again for inspiration. The classic Chinese perspective of three planes is evident - near, middle (represented by water and mist), and far. Unlike earlier examples of Chinese landscape art, the grandeur of nature is the main theme, rather than merely providing a backdrop. A packhorse train can barely be seen emerging from a wood at the base of a towering precipice. The painting's style encompasses archaic conventions dating back to the Tang dynasty.

The historian Patricia Ebrey explains her view on the painting that the:

...foreground, presented at eye level, is executed in crisp, well-defined brush strokes. Jutting boulders, tough scrub trees, a mule train on the road, and a temple in the forest on the cliff are all vividly depicted. There is a suitable break between the foreground and the towering central peak behind, which is treated as if it were a backdrop, suspended and fitted into a slot behind the foreground. There are human figures in this scene, but it is easy to imagine them overpowered by the magnitude and mystery of their surroundings.

Fan's masterpiece Travellers among Mountains and Streams bears a lost half-hidden signature rediscovered only in 1958.

== See also ==
- Culture of the Song dynasty
- Chinese Painting
- Chinese art
- History of Chinese art
