= Juran (painter) =

Chinese landscape painter

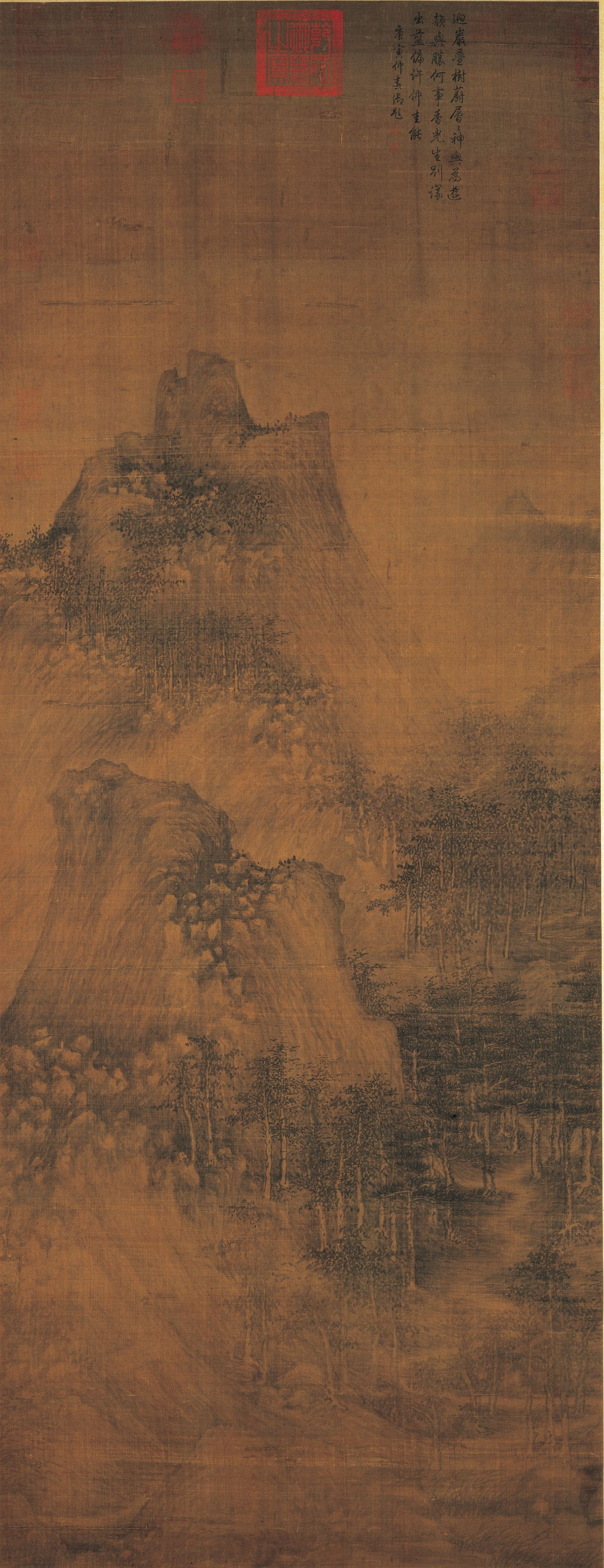
- Storied Mountains and Dense Forests. Hanging Scroll, ink on silk 144x55.4. National Palace Museum, Taipei, Taiwan.
- Known for: Painting
- Movement: Southern Tang

Juran (Chinese: 巨然; Wade–Giles: Chü-jan) (fl. 10th century) was a Chinese landscape painter and Buddhist monk of the Southern Tang and Northern Song dynasties.

Very little is known about Juran's life, and not even his family name is known (Juran is his Buddhist name). He was a native of Chiang-Ning and worked at the Southern Tang court in Jinling (today Nanjing). Around 975 Li Yu, the last ruler of the Southern Tang, surrendered to the Northern Song dynasty. Like many, Li Yu and his court officials were to move to the Northern Song capital, Bianjing (now Kaifeng); Juran went with them. He lived and worked at the K'ai-pao Buddhist temple in Bianjing, but quickly rose to prominence as landscape painter.

There are a few works that have been attributed to him on various grounds: two hanging scrolls in the collection of the National Palace Museum in Taipei, Taiwan (Storied Mountains and Dense Forests and Xiao Getting the Orchid Pavilion Scroll by Deception), and one hanging scroll in the collection of the Cleveland Museum of Art (Buddhist Monastery by Streams and Mountains). All these works show influence of Dong Yuan's style of rounded contours and soft brushstrokes, but no sign of the older painter's horizontal, level-distance landscape format. According to contemporary sources, Juran also painted a wall painting, Morning Scenery of Haze and Mist, very highly regarded by the artists of the time, but this work is lost.

== Gallery ==
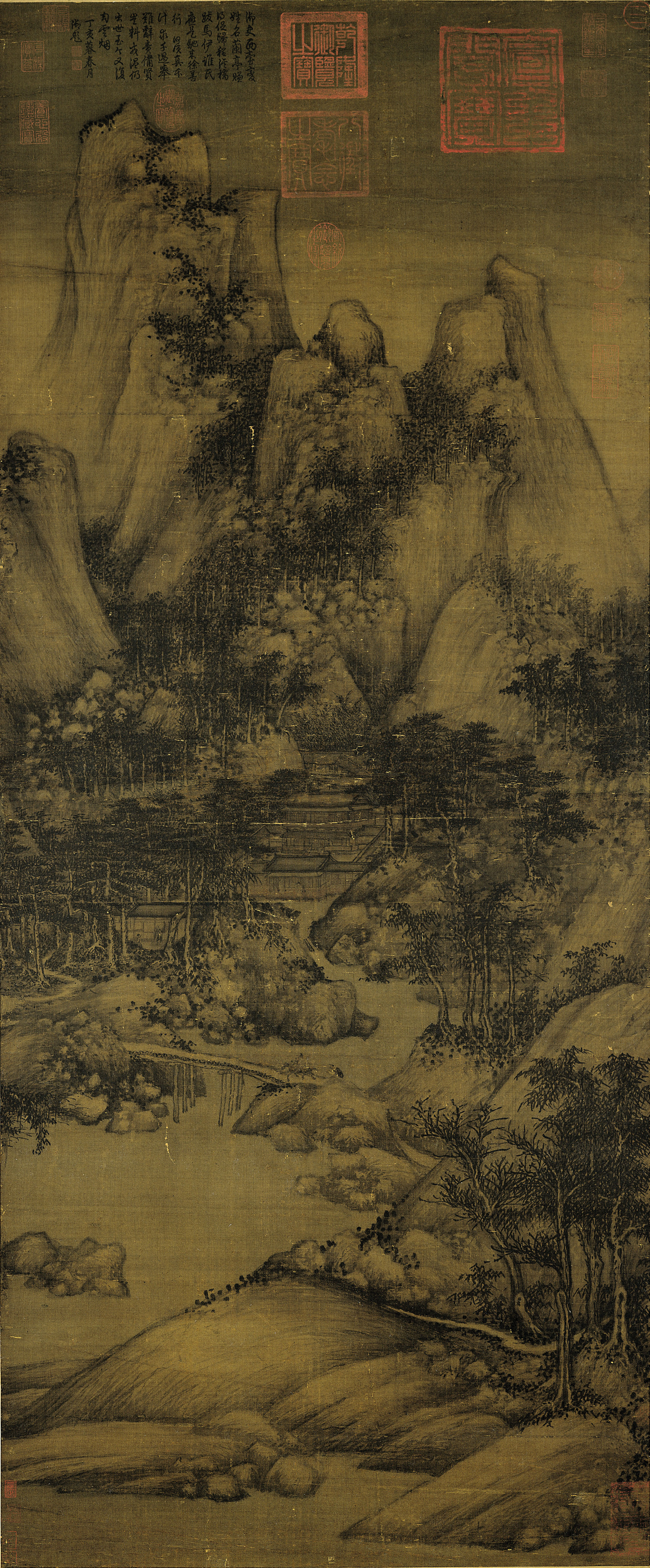
Xiao Getting the Orchid Pavilion Scroll by Deception
144.1 × 59.6 cm, National Palace Museum

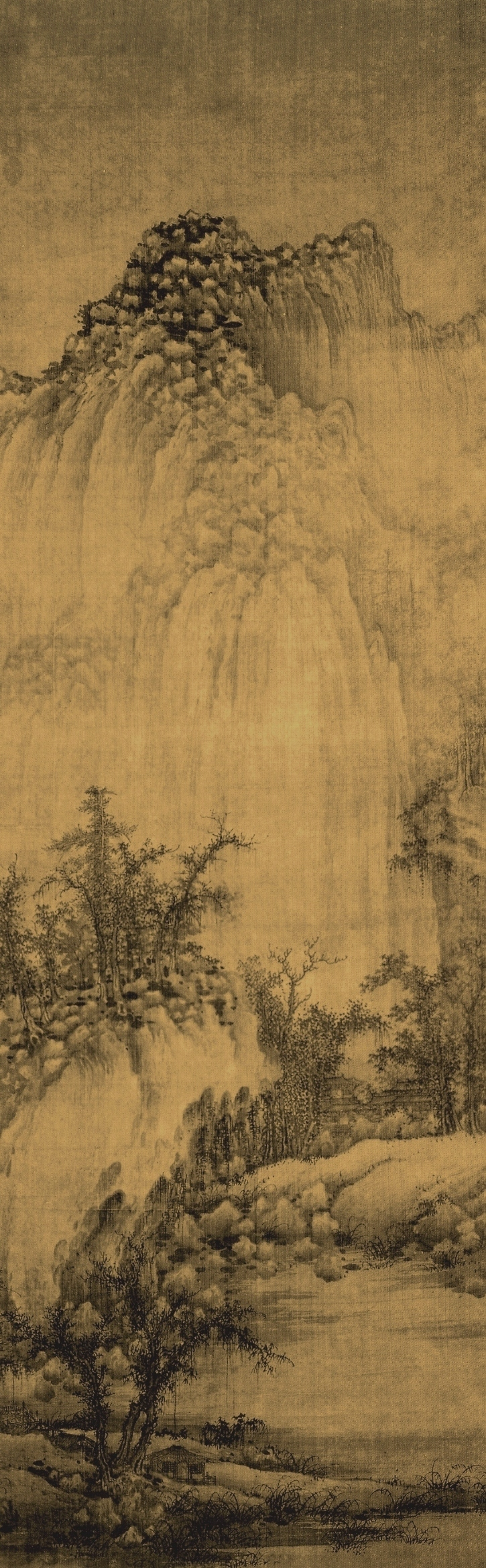
Buddhist Monastery by Streams and Mountains
185.4 × 57.5 cm, Cleveland Museum of Art

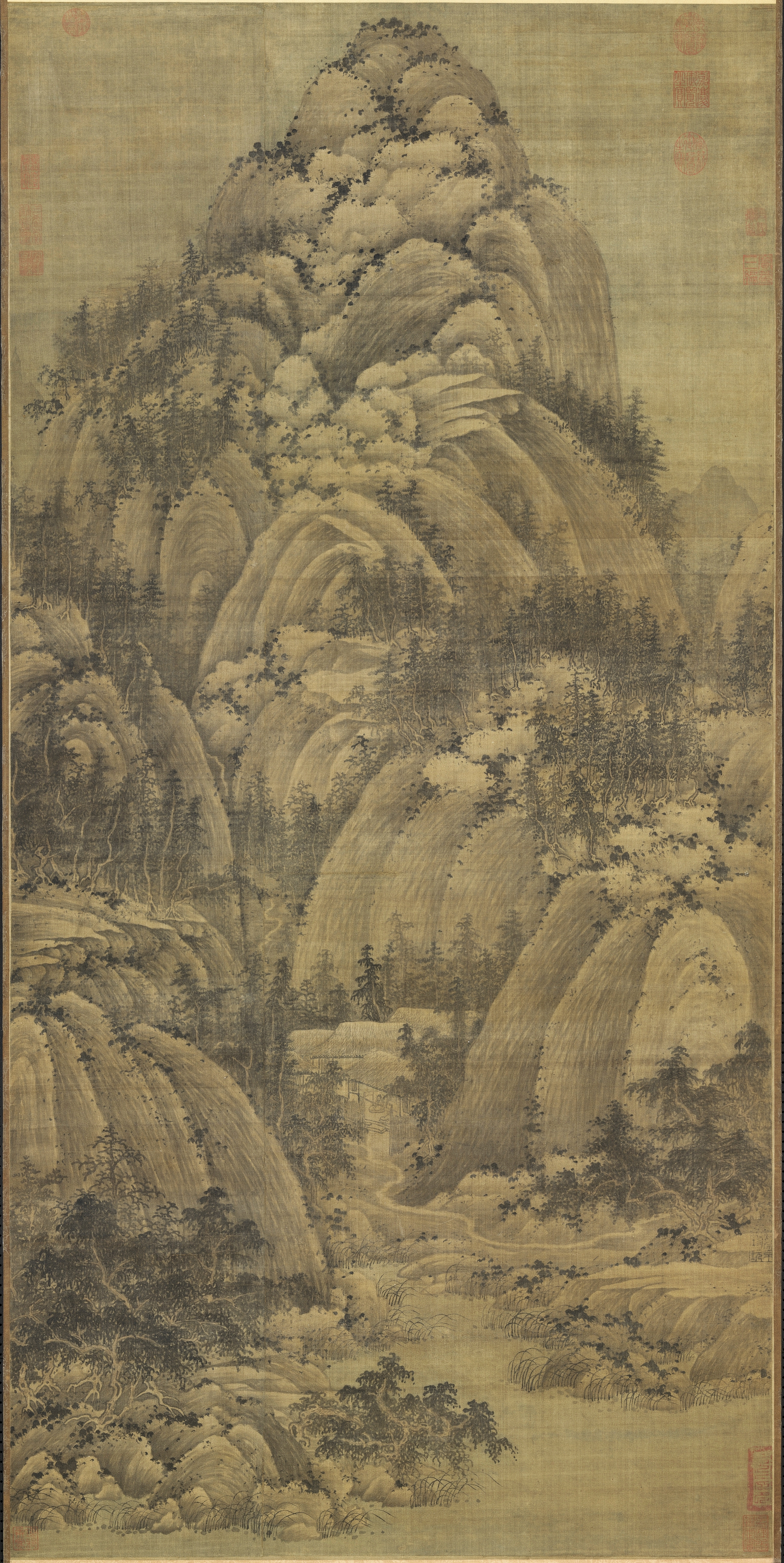
Seeking the Tao in Autumn Mountains
156 x 77.5 cm, National Palace Museum

== See also ==
- Culture of the Song dynasty
- Chinese painting
- Chinese art
- History of Chinese art
- Orchid Pavilion Gathering
