= Asobi (ancient Japan) =

Shinto priestesses and entertainers in Heian-period Japan

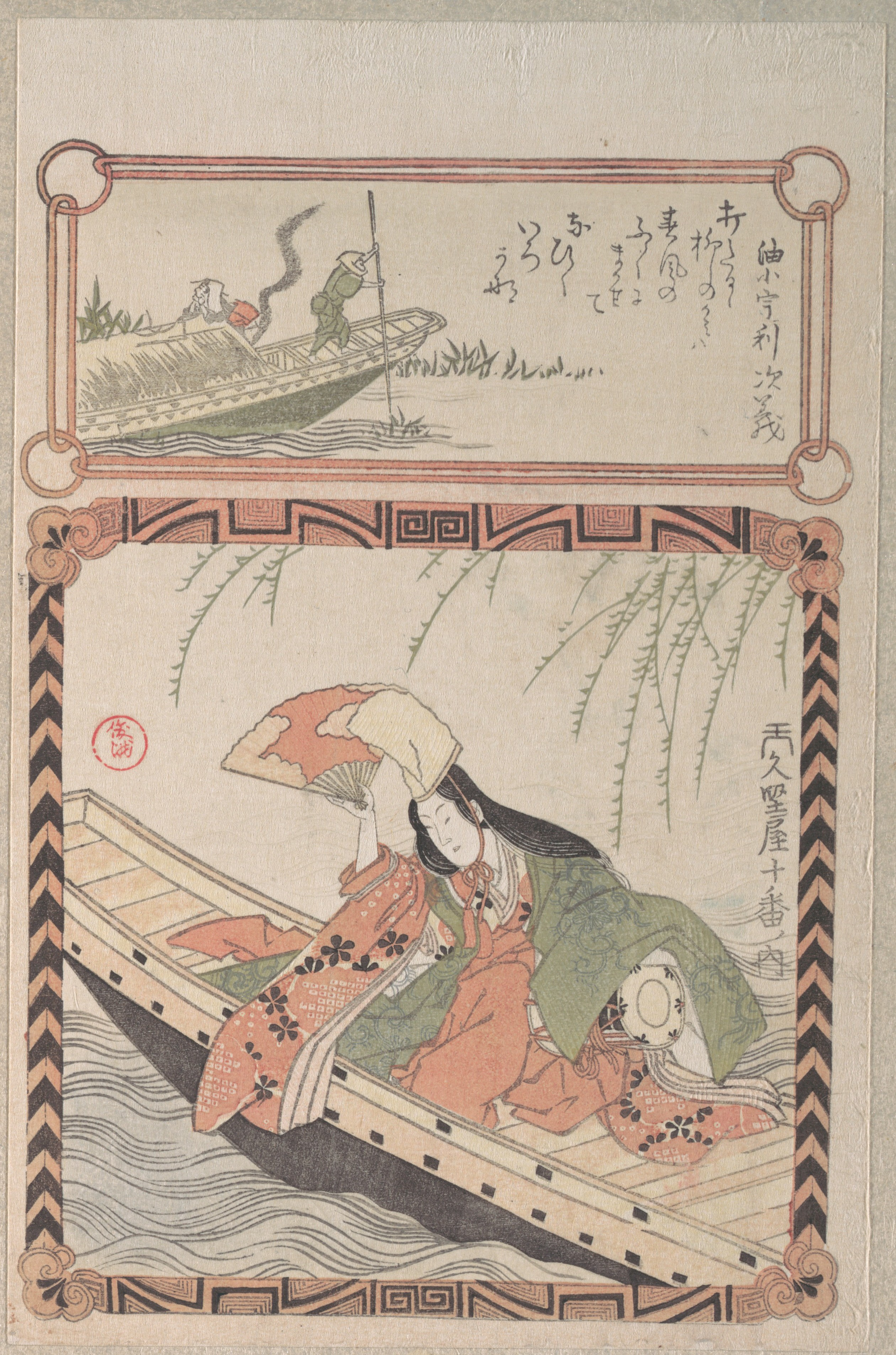
Asobi sitting on the boat, Kubo Shunman (1757–1820)

Asobi (遊) (also sometimes known as 遊部, asobi-be) were Shinto priestesses devoted to the goddess Ame-no-Uzume-no-Mikoto during the Heian period (794–1185) in Japan. Originating as performers of shamanistic rituals performed to appease the souls of the dead, asobi originally functioned as priestesses designed to deal with death. Though they played a role in conducting royal funerals, with the introduction of Buddhism and Confucianism in the 700s, the place of asobi in royal funerals disappeared, and they instead became known for their imayō songs. In combination with receiving gifts for sexual favors, imayō became the source of wealth for asobi.

After the Taihō Reform Code in 701 and the Yōrō code of 718, the public began to develop unsavory views toward the practices of asobi. Though they conducted business similarly to prostitutes, they were considered to be performers because of their musical talents. Yahochi being the term for prostitute, the kanwa dictionary Wamyō Ruijushō (compiled by Minamoto no Shitagō in the 930s) describes the difference as follows: "Those who wander about in the daytime are called asobi, while those who wait until nighttime and then engage in wanton sex (inbon) are called yahochi." Asobi were sometimes disparagingly referred to as yūjo, by one of their similar successors' names: shirabyōshi, kugutsu, and yukun, or referred to under the umbrella term for prostitutes of yahochi.

== History of the term ==
Asobi priestesses worshipped the goddess Ame-no-Uzume-no-Mikoto and believed themselves to be her descendants. The term asobi is said to come from a myth about the goddess Ame-no-Uzume on the origins of the Japanese nation recorded in the Kojiki (Record of Ancient Matters). The myth is as follows:

Amaterasu had a brother by the name of Susano-no-Mikoto. He repeatedly pranked Amaterasu which drove her to hide away in a rock cave. Her retreat brought darkness to the celestial realm and gods gathered at the cave. Ame-no-Uzume-no-Mikoto danced in front of the gathered gods. Divinely possessed, she became half-naked and exposed her breasts and lower body to the crowd. This made the gods burst into laughter. Upon hearing the commotion, Amaterasu peeked out of the cave to quell her curiosity.

Ame-no-Uzume's actions are labeled in the Kojiki as Asobi, which directly translates to "play". Ame-no-Uzume's actions were essentially a shamanistic ritual now interpreted as the archetypal funerary ritual performed to appease the soul of the dead. Before changes in the early 700s, asobi functioned as priestesses designed to deal with death and the relief of society from potential chaos and communal paralysis. They brought collective renewal in times of loss through transformational magic. From the myth as well as their social function, the archetypal image of asobi became that of a priestess and entertainer who mediated the worlds of light and darkness, or life and death.

== Asobi-be ==
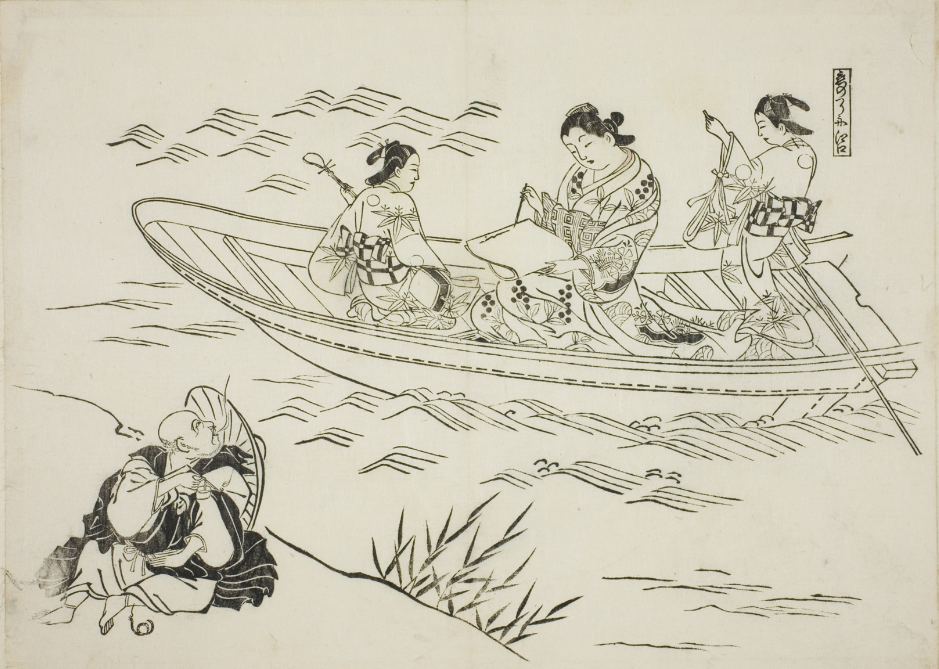
Asobis in a Boat on the Eguchi River, print by Okumura Masanobu

The special lineage group who served the royal morticians were called the asobi-be. Asobi-be lineage was succeeded by female clan members, but included some male members who worked as assistants. The asobi-be had exclusive access to royal coffins during enshrinement. They performed ritual dances and incantations that were passed down secretly through generations. Their rituals were considered crucial for deaths in the imperial court so they were granted immunity from conscript labor and taxes. They also had a distinct naming practice. In contrast to the standard convention during the Heian period, which identified both men and women in name by their parents, office, status, or court occupation, asobi used personal names. Somewhat similar to stage names, this naming practice indicated asobi occupied a position outside the hierarchy of the court and patriarchal family.

After the introduction of the Taihō Reform Code of 701 and the Yōrō Code of 718, unsavory views of asobi-be emerged. These codes adopted the legal and administrative system of China in attempts to consolidate central government power. Much of China's system was based on Confucianism, and as such many areas of Japan enforced the Confucian ethic of hard work, with a large shift in focus to agriculture production. Since asobi-be were exempt from conscripted labor, they did not contribute to agrarian processes and were viewed as non-productive. A section of the Yōrō code describes asobi as such:

Asobi-be are groups of people engaged in funeral services, exempt from taxes and conscript labor. Since they live without working and are allowed to move freely around, they are called asobi-be.

Asobi-be services began to carry a negative implication and the asobi-be as a whole became an expendable component of society. As the Taihō reforms became more entrenched in society, Buddhism took root. Buddhist priests, which consisted of mostly males, took over imperial funerary operations and the asobi-be lost their status. Once the center of the religious sphere, asobi-be became a part of periphery society.

After being pushed out of their role in funerary proceedings, asobi women were forced to find a new way to survive which led them to use their traditional dances and songs to survive. This, however, did not provide them enough funds to survive, leading them to turn to prostitution. Despite taking part in sexually explicit acts, societally asobi were not considered prostitutes as they did not solicit money, only accept gifts. At the time there was no legislation on prostitution in Japan, making it hard to distinguish between prostitutes and sexual partners who received gifts.

== Imayō – music and prostitution ==
After having been forced out of their profession's original focus, asobi had begun to take up permanent domiciles by the late 11th century. The most fabled asobi colonies concentrated at Eguchi along the Yodo River. The river served as the main passageway of travel from the inland sea to the capital of Heian-kyō. As the ports became busier with an increase in trade, asobi performances became more popular. Additionally alongside the river, there were many shrines that people pilgrimaged to, many of these pilgrims took part in and supported the asobi women. They became so popular that the Yūjoki (Record on Courtesans; c. 1087) describes their quarters as lining the doors of Kanzaki and Kanishima in the Settsu Province. Asobi sometimes visited the homes of patrons but customers could be entertained at dwellings similar to travelers inns located along highways called shuku. Some asobi even became landowners, a privilege held only by the upper echelons of Heian society.

Asobi were trained in performing songs of the imayō genre. Imayō songs had a wide variety of topics that appealed to all audiences: Buddhist doctrines, Buddha and his disciples, Buddhist saints, mountain ascetics, woodcutters, fishermen, gamblers, potters, barrier-keepers, Shinto shrine priestesses, trees, birds, snails, dragonflies, grasshoppers, and clothing. Some of the lyrics of the imayō come directly from sutras or vignettes of everyday life. The imayō were sung to the beat of a small drum, but as all that remains of them is their lyrics, little is known of their rhythm or melody. The imayō became a popular form of music in the Heian courts, which attracted many aristocratic men.

Asobi had an internal structure, headed by a headmistress called a chōja, so, or mune. The headmistress would have achieved her status through superior imayō skills and immense personal charm. She could also be chosen based on wealth or personal connections, as some asobi came from prominent families who had fallen from power. This role was often passed down hereditarily through mother and daughter. The mistress would work to protect the group members from exploitative customers, maintain group order, and distribute goods as needed amongst members.

Most asobi transactions were conducted on the water. The average asobi boat carried at least three members: one principal asobi who sang while beating a small drum; an apprentice asobi who looked after her mistress and held a large parasol; and an elderly, retired asobi in charge of rowing the boat. The reason asobi could openly solicit to their customers during broad daylight in front of onlookers was because they were considered talented performing artists. Without their musical qualifications, they would have been considered yahochi and had to conduct business according to certain rules. Their talent and magnetism also meant that high-level aristocrats were not afraid to admit they enjoyed the company of asobi, and it was not unheard of for asobi to marry into noble families.

It is also said that the asobi in their post-Buddhist form were not only entertainers, but retained some of their previous shamanistic elements. Having sexual intercourse with an asobi could be seen as a sacred act, as the asobi replicated the performance of a wife. One example of this is found within Fujiwara no Akihira's portraits of a lieutenant's family:

The fourth daughter is a shaman (kamunagi), skilled in divination, entertaining the kami with kagura dances, summoning them by plucking the string of a catalpa bow, and speaking with the voices of the dead. When she dances her sleeves billow like those of wizards at play, and when she sings her tones are dulcet and sublime, like the voice of a bird in the Gokuraku paradise. The atonal sound of her koto reaches down to the kami of earth, while the arhythmic beat of her drum makes foxes prick up their ears. And so men and women from all over the realm follow one after the other to see her and high and low from near and far crowd around her. Their offerings of rice pile up until there is no place to put them; their paper offerings accumulate until there is no time to count them. As for her husband, he is a scribe in the Right Equestrian Bureau and a neighborhood chief south of Shuchijō.

== Changes in societal perspectives ==
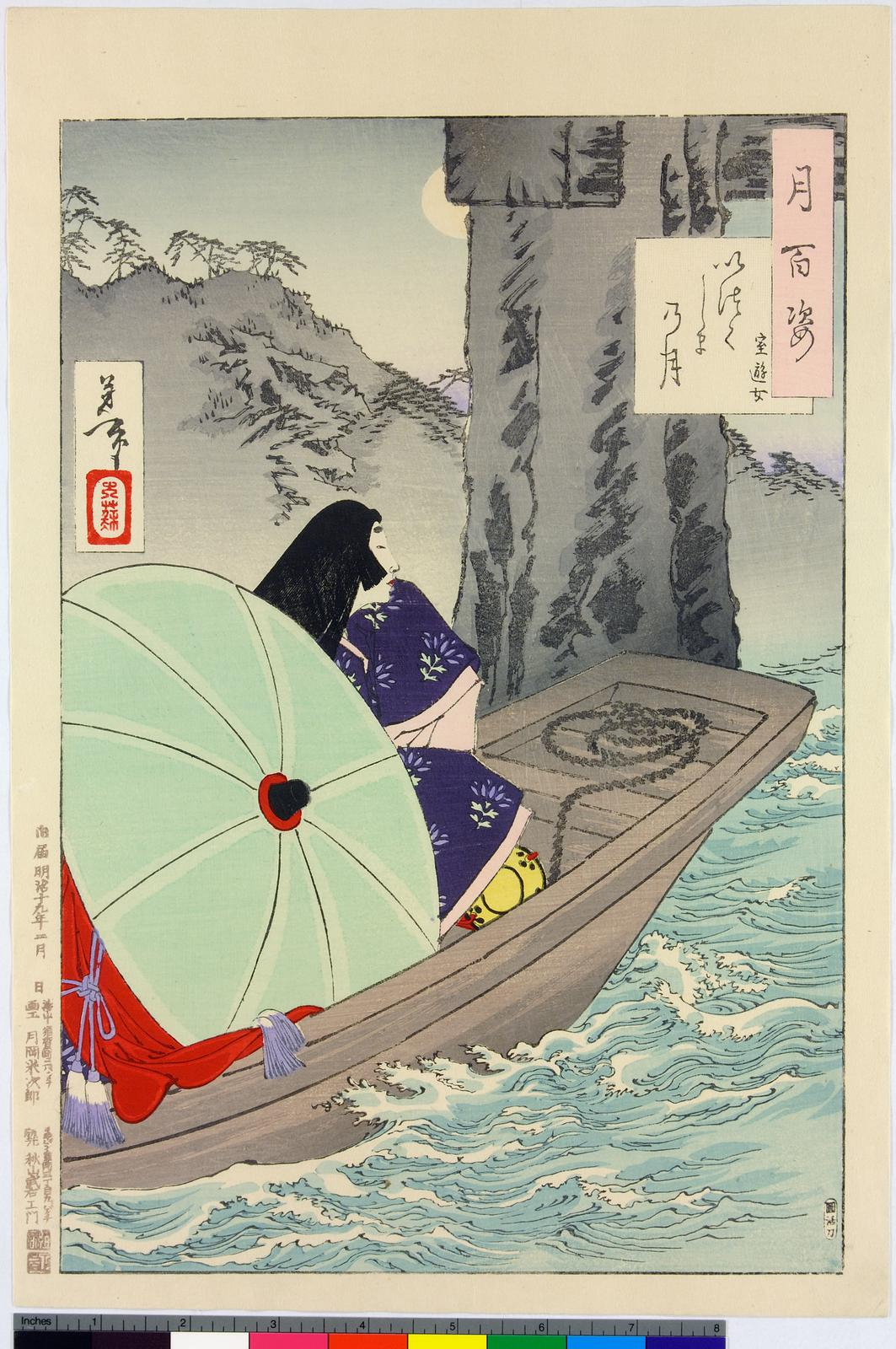
Muro's Asobi,Tsukioka Yoshitoshi, 1886

In the Kamakura period (1185–1333), many ideas changed about the ethics revolving around asobi women. Two documents from 1261 by officials at the Kasuga shrine complained that some priests had participated in sexual relations with female pilgrims; these actions were described as evil, and, in 1285, Emperor Go-Uda prohibited men and women from mixing during worship and prevented them from staying overnight. Buddhists however were unwilling to brand women as wrongdoers, instead focusing on the trade resulting in them offering solutions for their pain. In some tales, the asobi would take vows and achieve rebirth in paradise where others portray asobi as incarnations of Bodhisattvas. Buddhists began to spread the idea that asobi would violate men's control over their sexuality and therefore prevent their perusal of enlightenment. There are many testimonies from this time period that speak out against the asobi women, one example being Prince Genji from The Tale of Genji:

But Genji thought that whether a relationship was interesting or touching depended on the woman, and that there was no advantage to getting oneself involved in even a casual affair with someone a bit inconstant. He found the coquetry of the asobi distasteful.

Another example of the changing opinions of the asobi comes from the poet Saigyō in Senjūshō:

They must have become sexual entertainers because of karma from their past lives. How sad it is that they try to maintain their brief lives for just a little while by committing deeds strictly forbidden by the Buddha! We cannot avoid blame for our own transgressions, but isn't it much worse to lead multitudes of others astray?

This is held in direct opposition to the prior description of asobi women by Fujiwara no Akihira in Shinsarugakuki:

In the daytime she carries a huge parasol and offers her body to customers of high and low estate, and at night she drums the side of her boat and tenders her heart to travelers. Her vigor in soliciting lovers, her knowledge of all sexual positions, the merits of her lute strings and buds of wheat, and her mastery of the dragon's flutter and the tiger's tread techniques – all are her endowments. Not only that, she has the voice of a bird in Amida's paradise, as well as the face of an angel.

== Asobi and other female entertainers ==
=== Kugutsu ===
Asobi are often conflated with the kugutsu, but these are two separate groups of women who despite similarities are not the same. Kugutsu women were a part of a nomadic group that included both men and women. The men of this group worked at home while the women sang imayō and practiced prostitution like the asobi women. Kugutsu women practiced in different environments than the asobi working mostly in interior walkways in Aohaka, Sunomata, and Nogami. One of the most well-known men from this group is Ōe no Masafusa (1041–1111), an advisor to Emperor Go-Sanjō (1032–1073) who has one of the best descriptions of kugutsu women in his essay Kairaishiki:

The kugutsu have no fixed abodes and no permanent households. They live in animal-hair tents and drift from place to place in pursuit of food and water, just like the northern barbarians. All the men are skilled in archery on horseback and make their living by hunting. They twirl pairs of swords, juggle as many as seven balls, make wooden puppets dance, and stage wrestling competitions between puppets made of peachwood. The way they make these puppets act like living people resembles the feats performed by Chinese magicians. They transform sand and pebbles into gold coins and change grass and twigs into birds and animals. Indeed, their hands are quicker than a person's eyes! The women paint narrow curved eyebrows on their faces, use powder to make false teardrops on their cheeks, saunter in a flirtatious manner, and smile as if their decayed teeth hurt them. They adorn themselves with rouge and powder, sing seductive songs, and play voluptuous music, thereby pursuing sexual pleasure. Their parents and their husbands do not admonish them. They frequently entertain travelers, but they do not hesitate to spend a whole night of pleasure [with a single man]. Since their many lovers indulge them with valuables such as embroidered and brocade clothing, golden hair ornaments, and boxes decorated with gold, the women can't help but treasure these things.

=== Shirabyōshi ===
During the late Heian period the kagutsu and asobi were joined by the shirabyōshi, who sang imayō and performed a unique dance using swords. This dance was first performed in male dress. Along with other female performers, these women quickly grew patronage from elite men in the courts, one of the most famous being Emperor Go-Toba, who, during the Kamakura period, invited many women on excursions and made many of these women his concubines. In many ways, the shirabyōshi gained more popularity than the asobi, as the poet Fujiwara no Teika's diary Meigetsuki says:

Today, shirabyōshi were hired. It is said that they arrived wearing entirely new costumes. This time, asobi were not given clothing.

== Changes in religious beliefs ==
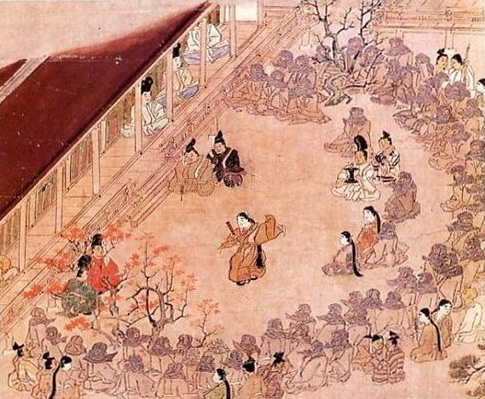
Honen shonin eden - dance, Hōnen Shōnin eden (ca. 1307)

In order to ensure business prosperity, asobi began worshipping the god Hyukudaifu (also called Hyakudayu or Momodayu), generally represented in male form. Hyakudaifu worship is a phallic cult with objects of veneration represented by male genitalia made of wood, paper, or stone. Yūjoki records say asobi women kept thousands of these objects. The cultic practice comes from the belief that praying to these objects and honoring Hyakudaifu would ensure continued success in drawing in male customers. This practice of worship, however, went beyond private observance, and asobi often took pilgrimages to shrines famous for Hyakudaifu practices, like the Hirota Shrine and the Sumiyoshi Shrine. Coincidentally, these shrines also were popular religious destinations for aristocrats from the capital. These chance encounters led to more business for the asobi and the beneficial results promoted the effectiveness of the Hyakudaifu cult among asobi. This led to more offerings for the shrines and economic support for the asobi.

== Go-Shirakawa ==
Emperor Go-Shirakawa (1127–1192) was absorbed with the art of imayō since he was a young child. During his reign, he fell in love with an asobi named Tamba-no-tsubone, who became one of his secondary wives. They had a prince and she makes appearances in his memoirs. He is known for his integral connections to the imayō art form, spending years cultivating his imayō skills before and through his reign. It was not unusual for him to forego sleep and endure physical discomforts to master the art. His infatuation caused him to be seen as an anomaly of the court and gave him an unsavory reputation; however, this did not deter him, and he summoned imayō singers of low social status to the imperial residence, especially asobi, to teach them their art form. Some of these women took part in critical discussions of the imayō art form, showing pride in their profession. This created a dialogue between the upper and lower class and helped restore some status to the asobi community.

One such woman by the name of Kane was the lady-in-waiting for his mother. In the year 1157, he invited an imayō expert by the name of Otomae, an elderly woman in her 70s, to his court. She came from the most authentic imayō lineage, and the emperor dedicated his time to relearning the art in its entirety. She taught him for over a decade and then made him the successor of her school of imayō. Every year after Otomae's passing, the emperor would hold a memorial service and sing at the anniversary of her death.

Go-Shirakawa compiled the largest imayō lyric collection into a book inspired by Otomae: Ryōjin Hishō ('Secret Selection of Music'). The book took him two decades to compile, completing the work in 1179. The Ryōjin Hishō is an important document in analyzing ancient culture in Japan. Imayō lyrics are one of the few resources that exists to this day that not only show the viewpoint of elite women, but also allow lower-class women their chance to express themselves and the world around them. The songs speak on the lives of the asobi women and their thoughts on their profession, the people they meet, and the ideas about gender that surround them daily through stereotypes and prejudices.

== Notable historical figures recorded as interacting with asobi ==
- Emperor Ichijō (r. 986–1011)
- Emperor Go-Sanjō (r. 1068–1072)
- Emperor Fujiwara Michinaga (966–1027): Gave favor to an asobi named Kokannon at Eguchi in the year 1000.
- Yorimichi (992–1074): Fell in love with an asobi named Nakanogimi at Eguchi in the year 1031.
- Emperor Go-Shirakawa (1127–1192)
- Minamoto Yoritomo (1147–1199)
- Fujiwara Akihira (989–1066)

== See also ==
- Shirabyōshi
- Yūkaku
