= Asobi =

Asobi may refer to:

- Asobi (遊), also known as asobi-be (遊部), Shinto priestesses in Heian period (794–1185) Japan.
- Asobi, a pet-like robot in the video game The Playroom
- Games, a 1971 film by Yasuzo Masumura
- Asobi, a mini-album by Tomohisa Yamashita
- Asobi (song), a 2014 song by Gesu no Kiwami Otome
