= Yuriwaka =

Japanese folk character

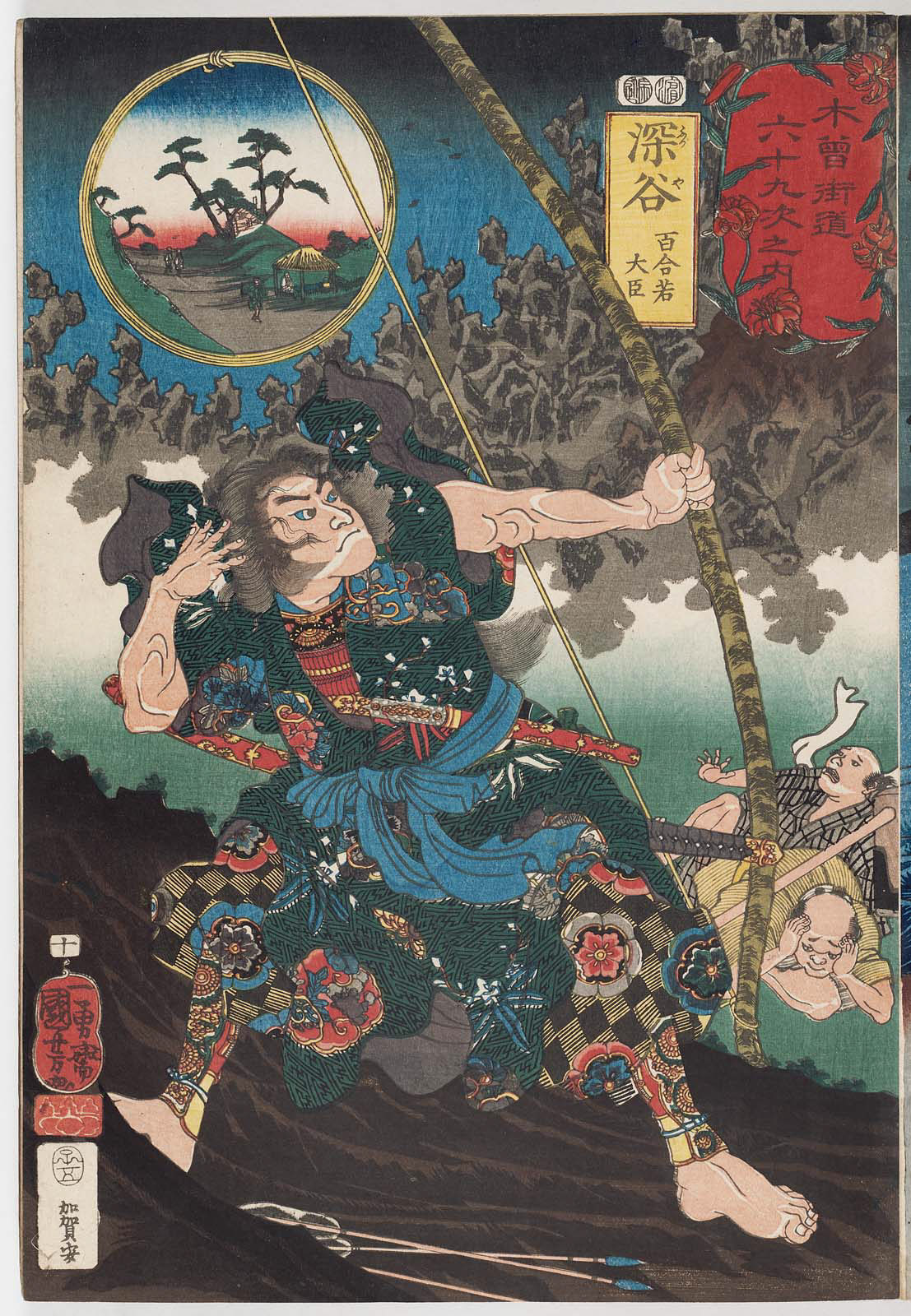
Yuriwaka Daijin having released his bow, set in Fukaya-shuku (1852). ―Kuniyoshi's series on the 69 stations of the Kiso-kaidō. Museum of Fine Arts, Boston, Bigelow collection. (Note: Legend usually associates him with Kyushu where he was governor, and he was famed for iron bow, not a wooden branch one as here.)

Yuriwaka (百合若), also Yuriwaka Daijin or Minister Yuriwaka (百合若大臣), is the titular hero of a Japanese tale of vengeance. Yuriwaka, famed for his enormous iron bow, is victorious as a general against the Mongolian forces, but is abandoned on an island by a traitorous subordinate (Beppu) who usurps his governorship. Yuriwaka's hawk (Midori-maru) couriers back a letter to his wife, who prays to the shrine, and through divine intervention, Yuriwaka returns to the province of his governorship. He withholds his identity until the opportune moment to prove his prowess on his iron bow, and avenges himself on the traitor.

The tale has been regarded as a Japanese rendition of the Greek epic of Ulysses, but a number of commentators have rejected this assumption, finding no convincing account of how the tale could have been transmitted. The common explanation is that Christian missionaries introduced the tale. The oldest known reference is from 1514, giving the names of the hero and the hawk. Formerly the oldest was thought to be a record of Yuriwaka being narrated in February 1551, a short time after the first European missionary contact with Japan.

The "Tale of Yuriwaka" (or "The Minister Yuriwaka") has existed in the form of librettos for performance in the kōwakamai dance since the late Muromachi period (16th century or even earlier), and later adapted for the jōruri puppet play and kabuki theater. The story has also been transmitted in folktale form widely throughout Japan, with a tradition that is particularly strong in the southerly Ōita Prefecture where the tale is set. Variants have also been recited in Oki Island by local priestesses.

== Texts ==
It had been thought that the oldest reference to this work occurred in the diary of Yamashina Tokitsugu (Tokitsugu kyō ki) in the entry for February 10, 1551 where the work recorded as "Yuriwaka" in hiragana was said to have been narrated in Kyoto that day. However it has been pointed out that the Ungyoku wakashō (1514) can be quoted with a passage that reads "Yurikusa-waka daijin, discarded on an island, and the hawk Midori-maru, etc."

The oldest manuscript copy of the work is the libretto for the kōwakamai dance in the "Daigashira Sahei collection", dated to the late Muromachi period,. This old text is simply entitled Daijin ("Minister"), and the hero is variously called Yurikusa-waka (百合草若), Yurikusa, or Yuriwaka (ゆりわか). (with the ministerial title "-daijin" appended to these names).

There is also a Noh theater play "Yuriwaka-kusa" dated also to late Muromachi, and here too the protagonist is written variously as "Yuriwaka-kusa" or "Yuriwaka".

Later copies of Yuriwaka Daijin appeared in woodblock-printed storybooks known as Texts for Kōwaka dances (舞の本, Mai no hon), dating to the 16th to early 17th centuries. (Note: Even though Mai no hon is literally "book of the dance", it is not a collection of libretti for performance, but storybooks for reading.) Some of these texts have been reprinted by modern publishers, for example, the Keichō 14 (1609) text and the Kan'ei era text (1620s to 40s)

There also survives Yuriwaka Daijin as performed in "sermon-ballads" (説経節, sekkyō-bushi) or "sermon-puppetry" (説経操り, sekkyō-kuri), ascribed to a performer named Higurashi Kodayū (日暮小太夫). It dates to Kanbun 2 (1662). (Note: The sermon text is incomplete; Yokoyama's modern edition restores the lacunae using the Keichō 14 (1609) Mai no hon text (reprinted in Heibonsha's Tōyō Bunko series).)

== Setting ==
Although the kōwakamai dance version of the Tale of Yuriwaka is set during the reign of Emperor Saga, and involves a Mongolian invasion that purportedly occurred in the year 816, the historically well-established Mongol invasions of Japan took place much later, in the 13th century.

== Summary ==
Below is a summary of the Yuriwaka tale as given in the kōwakamai texts.

=== Early life ===
Yuriwaka (Note: He is called Yurikusawaka(?) (百合草若) in the Daigashira Sahei collection text, considered the earliest.) was born after his childless father Kinmitsu (公満), the Minister of the Left under Emperor Saga, prayed to the Kannon goddess of mercy of Hatsuse-(no)-tera (初瀬寺) temple in Yamato Province (now Hase-dera). (Note: The sermon text gives the father's full name as Shijō Kinmitsu (四条公満), and the adult name Yuriwaka received in the rite of passage as Kinyuki (公行).) Yuriwaka becomes Minister of the Right at age 17, and marries the daughter of major counselor Akitoki.

=== Battle with Mongols ===
By divine oracle, Yuriwaka is appointed general to face the "Mukuri" (Mongols) (Note: From Mukoku (Mongolia).) who have landed their fleet in Hakata in the south of Japan. He is armed with an iron bow measuring 8 shaku 5 sun (approximately 8.5 feet), and 363 arrows. (Note: The bow and arrows were greased with mermaid oil.) He is granted governorship of Tsukushi Province, while leaving his wife to reside in neighboring Bungo Province.

The Mongols had been driven away by kamikaze "divine winds". (Note: In some versions, they first retreat to Mongolia, then foray back out to sea.) Yuriwaka leads a fleet of ships in pursuit, and eventually (Note: Eventually after a 3 year standoff.) a naval battle unfolds at Chikura-ga-oki ("open sea of Chikura"), (Note: The text notes Chikura-ga-oki is at a shiozakai or a border between two ocean currents, an oceanic front.) supposedly somewhere between Japan and China/Korea.

On the Mongolian side, a general (Note: A general of the Kirin nation.) spews his breath causing a fog, but this is dispelled by Japanese deities. Buddhist inscriptions also turn into arrows and swords, attacking the Mongols. Yuriwaka fights ferociously, spending nearly all his arrows in battle. He gains victory when the four Mongolian grand generals succumb. (Note: The generals are named Ryōzō, Kasui, Flying Cloud, and Running Cloud. The first is killed, second commits suicide, the other two are captured.)

=== Treachery and vengeance ===
Yuriwaka wishes to repose on "Genkai-ga-shima" island (which may or may not be Genkai Island (Note: A later passage reveals this island lies north of Iki's bays, which geographically contradicts identification with Genkai Island. It may therefore be some other island in the Genkai Sea.) and falls into slumber for 3 days, as happens when such a hero exerts his "mighty strength". (Note: The original kōwakamai text says "As is the wont of mighty strength (大力の癖やらん)".) Subordinates named the Beppu brothers hatch a plot and report Yuriwaka dead, causing him to be left abandoned on this island. Beppu Tarō, the elder sibling, is promoted governor of Tsukushi.

Beppu Tarō makes amorous advances on Yuriwaka's wife. But the faithful wife is resolved to commit suicide should her true husband not return, and begins to bestow personal effects such as her biwa and koto, and releasing kept animals, which included a hawk named Midori-maru. The hawk reaches the island where his master is marooned, and brings back Yuriwaka's letter written in blood on oak leaves. Learning of her husband's survival, she tries to make the hawk deliver inkstick and inkstone but the bird falls by the weight and its body is found awash.

The wife prays at Usa Shrine for the husband's safe return, and the wish is granted. A fisherman and his boat is blown away by wind from the inlet of Iki Province, finds Yuriwaka on "Genkai-ga-shima" island, and brings him back to the Japanese mainland. Yuriwaka arrives in Hakata but he is so haggard-looking that no one recognizes him. Beppu on a whim decides to employ the strange man, and entrusts him to an old man named Kadowaki.

Around this time, Beppu has decided to execute Yuriwaka's wife who would not show him any affection. This is prevented by Kadowaki who sacrifices his daughter instead. In the kōwakamai dance text, it is an unnamed girl who was executed by drowning in Mannōga-ike (まんなうが池) pond. (Note: The term used here for the drowning is "kindling-dunking" (柴漬, fushi-zuke), whereby the convict is wrapped up in sticks, weighted and drowned.) (Note: The self-sacrificing girl is named Manju-hime (萬壽姫) in the Oita legend, and recorded in the foundation story of Manju-ji.)

In the New Year's archery ceremony at Usa Shrine, Yuriwaka (now known as "Koke-maru") is ordered by Beppu to accompany him as an assistant to hand out the arrows. Yuriwaka mocks all the archery contestants and is ordered to shoot an arrow himself. Yuriwaka thereupon demonstrates his ability to draw and fire the famed iron bow, definitive proof that he is Yuriwaka of the strongbow. The men of Ōtomo clan and the Matsura band prostrate themselves. Beppu Tarō surrenders but is not forgiven, and meets a gruesome death by sawing his head over 7 days. (Note: Although Irie interprets the passage to mean "the head was cut off and pulled/dragged around", there are two variant transcriptions or hiki-kubi which when written as "引き首" has ambiguous meaning, but when written as "挽首" means "sawing".) Yuriwaka rewards his fisherman rescuer with Iki Province and Tsushima Province, and appoints Kadowaki to a position of governance (mandokoro) at his plantation estates (shōen) in Tsukushi Province. Yuriwaka himself goes to the capital and becomes a general.

== Legends ==
The legend occurs throughout Japan, distributed widely from Okinawa to Hokkaido, a heavy concentration in Kyushu, especially Oita Prefecture.

=== Legend in Oita ===
The English translation in an anthology by folklorist Richard Dorson is similar to this.

In the Oita version, Yuriwaka is born as the son of Kinmitsu, the Minister of the Left. He grows up to be a brave youth, known for his skill with the bow an arrow. The iron bow is already in his possession in his youth. He marries a princess named Kasuga-hime, and is appointed kokushi (governor) of Bungo Province.

Yuriwaka is ordered to dispel the vast army of Mongols (or "Muguri") invading Japan, and defeats them decisively in a sea battle off Tsushima island. After the victory, he is betrayed by his subordinate Beppu Tarō, and left abandoned on Genkai Island. Beppu Tarō returns to Japan and submits a false report that Yuriwaka died of illness, thereby gaining an appointment of the governorship over Bungo that has been left vacant.

Kasuga-hime is accosted by Beppu Tarō, but incredulous of Yuriwaka's demise, releases the hawk Midori-maru with a letter tied to its leg. The hawk reaches Genkai Island, and Yuriwaka sends a reply written in blood. Kasugahime then ties inkstone, brush, and ink stick to the hawk to deliver, but the bird is overcome by weight and falls to the sea, washing up on Yuriwaka's island.

Yuriwaka gains passage on a storm-drifted fishing boat, and upon his return to Bungo conceals his identity, assuming the pseudonym "Koke-maru", entering service under Beppu Tarō. At the New Year's archery ceremony, Yuriwaka ridicules Beppu and demonstrates his own skill by drawing the famed iron bow (which proves his identity). Yuriwaka shoots the treacherous Beppu Tarō and exacts his revenge. Yuriwaka is reunited with his wife, and regains the governorship.

The girl who had sacrificed herself to receive the death penalty in place of Yuriwaka's wife is known as Manju-hime (万寿姫) in this Oita tradition, and is the daughter of the gatekeeper old man. Her drowning is set at the pond named Makomo-no-ike (菰の池), and on that spot the hero erected the temple Makomo-yama Manju-ji. (Note: As noted, Manju-hime is described in the engi or the story of the founding of Manju-ji.) Also, to pay respect to the hawk Midori-maru, he erected the Jingu-ji temple on Takao-yama.

=== Iki Island pracitces ===
The legend as found on Iki Island is considered a composite of various tales.

Here, shamanistic miko priestesses, locally called ichijō, perform a ritual by placing a bow atop a shallow bentwood box called the yuri (盒), while reciting the Yuriwaka sekkyo.

According to the text of the Yuriwaka sekkyo published by Shinobu Orikuchi, Yuriwaka was Momotarō the peach boy (or someone with that childhood name), who later leads troops to vanquish oni (ogres).

In a variant, the father is Sumiyaki Kogorō (Kogorō Charcoalmaker) from Usuki, Ōita, also known as Man no chōja (万の長者). He had great wealth but no children and loses in a contest with Asahi no chōja who is not so wealthy by blessed with children. Afterwards, he prays day and night to the Kannon, which is answered when Yuriwaka is born. The Yuriwaka daijin marries the general's daughter Teruhi-hime (輝日姫), going on an ogre-subjugating campaign to Keiman (芥満) country, ruled by Akudoku-ō (悪毒王) identifiable as Akuro-ō). He is betrayed by the Shikibu-dayū brothers, and left abandoned on a small isle in Keiman, but returns to wreak his vengeance.

=== Traditions regarding the hawk ===
The hawk Midori-maru is enshrined in Kodaka Jinja on Genkai Island.

There is a local tradition that Yuriwaka was abandoned on Meshima in the Danjo Islands, southeast of Gotō Islands. The Ōdai Myōjin (鷹大明神) shrine there is said to be built in veneration of the hawk, Midori-maru.

In Seirō, Niigata, Yuriwaka's hawk Midori-maru (翠丸) came to live in a forest near the Takao Kannon-ji temple, according to one record (Echigo noshi), and the founding story of the Kannon hall at Mount Seirō(copied 1608) says the building was founded to enshrine the hawk.

== Relation with Homer's Odyssey ==
Tsubouchi Shōyo claimed Homer's Odyssey was transmitted to Japan in some form, and adapted into Japanese to become Yuriwaka (Waseda bungaku, 1906).

Similarity of the names Ulysses and Yuriwaka, and motif of the wives buying time to fend off suitors (Penelope does so by weaving) are some of the parallels

Tsubouchi while allowing that it is not known "which country's folk" might have passed on the epic, he arrived at the idea that it might have entered through "Sakai or Yamaguchi". These places are connected with Portuguese missionaries, and Tsubouchi's view is considered a theory of transmission by the early Portuguese in Japan (Nanban-jin). Shinmura Izuru's Nanbanki is an even stronger advocate of the theory.

=== Opposition ===
This theory was at one time under sharply attack by such men as Tsuda Sōkichi, Yanagita Kunio, Takano Tatsuyuki, Watsuji Tetsurō.

The main thrust to the opposition's argument is that tales of this type are widely disseminated worldwide, and the similarities can be coincidental. And Yuriwaka was performed already in 1551, only 7 years after the Portuguese reached Japan and brought the Tanegashima rifle, which is insufficient time for the story to be absorbed and adapted, according to Kanesaki Takeo

=== Support ===
Among Tsubouchi's supporters are, aside from Shinmura, Esther Lowell Hibbard (professor at Doshisha University) and James. T. Araki. Araki argued that even if Yuriwaka was performed as early as 1551, it was possible for Francis Xavier's interpreter Juan Fernandez to have transmitted the tale around 1550. (Note: Araki points out that the Latin form Ulyxes is quite close to Yurikusa, which is the older form of Yuriwaka.) Some papers that express agreement are Imoto Eiichi (2004) and Matsumura Kazuo (2016) The proponents point out that Ulysses and Yuriwaka demonstrate parallel motifs at each stage in the plot, unlike other like tales.

=== Further interpretation ===
The premise that Araki, etc. relies on is that the oldest record dated to 1551. But it has since become known that Ungyoku waka shō (雲玉和歌抄) predates it, making it more problematic for the Portuguese transmission theory. However, if one take Tsubouchi and Niimura's definition Nanban-jin theory more broadly to include Muslims living in Asia, there is still a viable possibility, as Minakata Kumagusu ha pointed out.

Inoue Shōichi rejects Tsubouchi's theory of transmission during the Portuguese missionary period, and regards it a story spread widely throughout Eurasia in prehistoric times. Yuriwaka bears resemblance to the central Asian epic of Alpamysh, which perhaps carried the storyline eventually to Japan. Yuriwaka and the Kōga Saburō legend may have both traced such an Asiatic route, as conjectured by Ōbayashi Taryō and others.

Regarding Minamoto Yoshitsune is the theory that Yoshitsune is Genghis Khan (義経=ジンギスカン説; "Mongols" being the common factor with Yuriwaka). Looking further, one discovers that a Yoshitsune fairy tale called Onzōshi shimawatari bears similarity to Yuriwaka.

== See also ==
- Kōda Rohan
- Kōwakamai
- Mongol invasions of Japan
- Shinmura Izuru
- Takano Tatsuyuki
- Ueda Kazutoshi
