= Esther Lowell Hibbard =

American educator

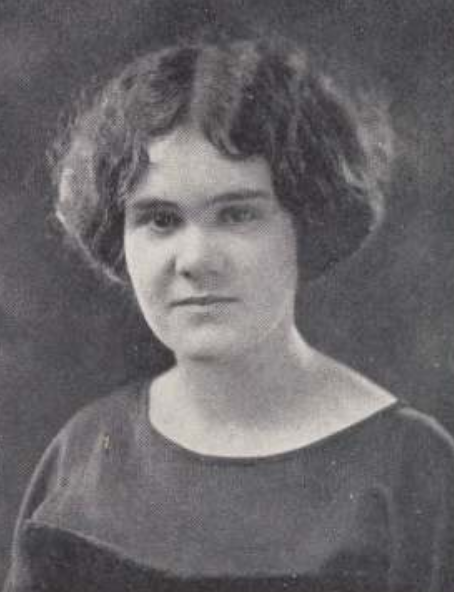
- Esther Lowell Hibbard, from the 1924 Mount Holyoke College yearbook
- Born: September 23, 1903; Tokyo
- Died: 1999 (aged 95–96); California
- Occupations: Writer, educator, translator, college administrator

Esther Lowell Hibbard (September 23, 1903 – 1999) was an American writer, educator, college administrator, and translator, based for much of her life in Japan. She was on the faculty of the Doshisha Women's College of Liberal Arts from 1929 to 1941, and from 1946 to 1988.

== Early life ==
Hibbard was born in Tokyo, the daughter of American missionaries Carlisle V. Hibbard and Susan Eugenia Lowell Hibbard. Both of her parents were from Wisconsin. Her father worked for the YMCA in Tokyo. She live part of her childhood in Manchuria; her younger brother Lowell died there in 1909. She completed her undergraduate studies at Mount Holyoke College, and earned a master's degree in English at the University of Wisconsin, Madison. In 1944, she completed a doctorate at the University of Michigan, with a dissertation titled "The Yuriwaka Tradition in Japanese Literature".

== Career ==
Hibbard taught English and music at Doshisha Girls' School in Kyoto from 1929 to 1941. She took an interest in the culture and traditional arts of Japan; she visited Shinto shrines, studied woodcarving, and learned to play the koto. She was evacuated from Japan along with most other American missionaries in 1941, during World War II. In the United States during the war, she taught Japanese in Chicago. She taught at Northwestern University from 1944 to 1946.

In 1946, Hibbard returned to teach at Doshisha, and by 1948 was dean of the women's college. She also ran a Christian summer camp at Lake Biwa, and edited the Japan Christian Quarterly. She retired from Doshisha in 1988, but taught in Japan a few more years, at Tohoku Gakuin.

In her later years, Hibbard translated Japanese hymns, and wrote a memoir of her childhood, "And gladly teche": Memoirs of a Missionary Kid (1988).

== Selected bibliography ==
- The Ulysses Motif in Japanese Literature (1946)
- Readings in English Prose ad Poetry for Advanced Classes (textbook, 1934, 1956)
- Fun and Festival from Japan (children's book, 1956) (co-author, with Alice E. Gwinn)
- Ha Deusu. Refutation of Deus by Fabian (1963) (translated by Hibbard)
- "And gladly teche": Memoirs of a Missionary Kid (1988)

== Personal life ==
In 1973, Hibbard moved back to the United States, and lived in a retirement community for former church workers in Claremont, California. She died in 1999. The Carlisle V. Hibbard Papers at the Wisconsin Historical Society are a rich source on Esther Lowell Hibbard's career.
