= Kusemai =

Kusemai (曲舞, くせまい) is a dance-like art form originating from medieval Japan (roughly, the Kamakura and Muromachi Periods). It was particularly popular during Japan's Nanboku Period (CE1336-1392) up through the end of the rest of the Muromachi Period (CE 1336–1573). Kusemai is sometimes simply characterized as a Japanese form of song and dance with a strong irregular beat - emphasis is placed on the beat at the expense of the melody.

Kusemai is sometimes referred to in classical and medieval Japanese simply as mai (舞), or “dance.” While the modern Japanese kanji spelling of kusemai is 曲舞, written variants of the kanji are found in written records as 久世 舞 (kuse-mai) and 九世 舞 (kuse-mai). The “dance,” or pre-arranged physical movements of kusemai, are widely held to be the root of kōwakamai’s dance-element.

The type of music that accompanies the kusemai performance particularly flourished around Kyoto and Nara, in the 14th and 15th centuries. The name can be roughly translated as "peculiar/unconventional dance." Although dance was originally involved with the performance, it was of minor importance, and probably involved the performer simply stamping the beat.

== Summary ==
Kusemai's origins are unknown but it appears to have started in the late 15th to early 16th centuries. A Muromachi Period illustration titled Shichijuuichi-ban shokunin utaawase (七十一番職人歌合) depicts a kusemai performer in contrast to another shirabyōshi (白拍子) performer. Since the garments and musical accompaniment of both kusemai and shirabyōshi, which came about at the end of the Heian Period, are so similar some scholars believe that shirabyōshi is the root of kusemai.

A kusemai performance consists of a story/narrative tale and rhythmic musical accompaniment. The performer recites the narrative lines while dancing to the music [performed by separate musicians]. The dancer was either a man or a young boy (chigo, 稚児).

The young boy-dancer costume consisted of suikan (水干, Heian period-style garments), ōguchi (大口, a long, loose fitted, pleated skirt), and tall style eboshi cap. Adult male dancers wore warrior-class garments called hitatare (直垂) in place of suikan. Dancers also held a folding fan which served as a basic performance prop.

There are also performances called onna no kusemai (女曲舞) or jokyokumai (女曲舞) in which women wear the male performer's clothes and perform kusemai.

The kusemai “Yamauba” and “Hyakuman” are said to be the oldest performances of kusemai, having been transmitted from time immemorial to the present. Also, kōwakamai, which is sometimes considered a style of kusemai, is known to have been created sometime in the Muromachi Period and has been passed down to the present day.
