= Kōwakamai =

Japanese dance

Kōwakamai (幸若舞) is a Japanese recitative dance, originating in the 15th century and popular during the Sengoku and early Edo periods (late 16th to early 17th centuries). Although kōwakamai has dance and musical components, scholars consider its textual component as an independent literary genre.

Kōwakamai may have evolved from the dance form called kusemai of the 14th century, sharing its origins in traditional court dance and music with nō and kabuki. Little is actually known about how the dance was performed in the warlord to shogunate periods. A remnant of the kōwakamai is performed every year on January 20 at Tenman-jinja, a shintō shrine in Ōe.

== History ==
Kōwakamai (along with Noh) is a form of entertainment enjoyed by warrior-class families during Japan's medieval age. Kōwakamai performances were celebratory but also the cause for sorrow. Many of the pieces are sorrowful tales, ranging from resoundingly sympathetic tales dealing with the loss of life and defeat. The piece titled "Atsumori which depicts Taira no Atsumori and Kumagai Naozane at the Battle of Ichi-no-Tani is especially popular for these reasons.

When considering the kōwakamai lineage and the creation of kōwaka dance pieces (幸若舞曲, kōwaka-bukyoku) (the actual kōwakamai written-texts), one Momonoi Naoaki (桃井直詮) is usually accredited. Momonoi Naoaki claimed to be the grandson of Momonoi Naotsune, who in turn was a descendant of Minamoto no Yoshiie. Momonoi Naoaki's childhood name was "Kōwakamaru" (幸若丸), from which it is said the term "kōwakamai" gets its name.

Kōwakamaru was born in Nyū district, Echizen Province. (Note: In the Kowaka keizu no koto, the opening paragraph describes Naotsune's heir Naokazu (who died 1370), and his son "Naotada" got his wife from Kyoto pregnant; she later gave birth to Naoaki (Kōwakamaru) in Hozenji Village, Nyū district (Sasano 1943, pp. 191–192).) (Note: His birthyear and age of death are given variously by sources (Sasano (1943), p. 23). He was born Ōei 12 (1405) and died 1470 in according to the oldest surviving genealogical document, dating to the early Edo period (Araki (1964), p. 21). According to one of the Hachirokurō genealogies, he was born Meitoku 4 (1393, and died Bunmei 2, year of "metal rat", 1471, but that year was not the year of the rat, hence possibly miscopied from Bunmei 12 or 1481 (Fujita 1934, pp. 283–).) After his father's death he entered Mt. Hiei (probably Enryaku-ji temple). (Note: Either became young male attendant (稚児, chigo) to Monk Kōrin (光林坊, Kōrinbō) aka Senshin (詮信)), or was sent to Kōrin Cloister (光林房, Kōrinbō) in the care of his uncle Senshin.) (Note: Becoming a boy at "Mt. Hiei" meant entering Enryaku-ji or joining the ranks under Hiyoshi Shrine, probably as a Buddhist chanter.) At age 16, he accompanied the chief priest of Enryaku-ji (天台座主, tendai zasu) to the imperial court in Kyoto, and then became employed by the court by Retired Emperor Shōkō's decree. In Kyoto, his talents in music and dance became renowned, (Note: "音声無類の器用にて (Sound and voice of peerless adroitness)") and eventually initiated the Kōwaka style.

Several accounts describe how Kōwakamaru developed the new art form. His talent for shōmyō (Buddhist chant) being recognized, he received tutelage under the kusemai dance master Jifuku-dayū (?) (地福大夫), beginning his lessons with Chang Liang (張良, Chōryō) and Manjū (満仲). Or, while in Kyoto he was taught Heike in melodies similar to the Kōwaka, then devised tunes different from his master. (Note: Japanese text: "平家の本 (book of Heike)" , "師伝の外なる妙曲 ( skilful tunes other than what was taught from his instructor)") Or that the art blossomed when he adapted the sōshi narrative "Yashima-gun" and set it to music, to great acclaim. (Note: Kōwaka Hachirokurō Naoyoshi (直良)'s record from Genroku 11 (1698) states he and another boy named Komai-maru collaborated in the Yashima-gun's tune.)

=== Echizen Kōwaka troupe ===
Thus Momonoi Naoaki (Kōwakamaru) founded the Kōwaka troupe, and afterwards styled his clan's name as the "Kōwaka family". The family had three branches: the Hachirokurō, Yajirō, and Kohachirō, named after the founder's sons and son-in-law, and were based in Nyū district of Echizen Province, thus they have been called the "Echizen Kōwaka troupe (Echizen Kōwaka-ryu)". (Note: To distinguish from the Daigashira style, an offshoot of the art, described below.)

Kōwakamai reached its peak during the 16th century when the actors received small fiefdoms (chigyō) from warlords Oda Nobunaga, Toyotomi Hideyoshi and the like. When Tokugawa Ieyasu founded the shogunate, the clan received 300 koku of rice as stipend, and the three families took turns serving in rotation.

=== Daigashira School ===
The Daigashira School of kōwakamai was founded by Yamamoto Shirozaemon (山本四郎左衛門), who learned the art from Kōwaka Yajirō Naoshige. Shirozaemon passed the art to his disciple Mukadeya Zenbē (百足屋善兵衛) then to Ōsawa Jisuke Yukitsugu (大沢次助幸次). In Tenshō 10 (1582 CE) Yukitsugu was invited to Kyūshū by the lord of Chikugo Province's Yamashita Castle, Kamachi Shigeharu/Shigeyuki (蒲池鎮運), and his cousin, the lord of Yanagawa Castle, Kamachi Shigenami where he taught the performance style and transmitted the art form to the lords and their vassals. That style of kōwakamai became Ōe kōwakamai.

=== Decline ===
In the early parts of the Edo period, kōwakamai performances were given annually at the court of the shogunate. But the art had gone into obscurity by the Genroku era (1688–1704), and had fallen into complete oblivion by the Meiji period in the 19th century.

The Daigashira School Ōe kōwakamai has been transmitted to the present day, surviving in the Ōe district of Miyama, Fukuoka. (See §Restoring the kōwakamai art below).

== Kōwakamai corpus ==
Many kōwakamai pieces represent variations of tales found in other texts and genres. However, the kōwakamai versions contain variations such as shortening or extending the dramatic prose of given scenes within an episode.

Kōwakamai originally had "sanjūroku-ban" (三十六番) thirty-six numbers in the standard repertoire. Anecdotally, there were thirty-six otogi-zōshi storybooks at the imperial court that the founder set to music. But according to one genealogical document, (Note: Kōwaka keizu no koto) a larger number of pieces were culled to a canon of thirty-six pieces during the time of Kohachirō. The standard thirty-six texts were also later wood-block printed in storybooks called Texts for Kōwaka dances (『舞の本』」, Mai no hon).

There were outside-the-canon pieces added, raising the total to forty-two pieces. Some fifty total texts survive today. (Note: The count might be smaller, if one excluded short pieces such as "Matsueda" (松枝) and "Rōjin" (老人))

For argument's sake kōwakamai fall into the following categories: Ancient tales, Minamoto tales, Heike tales, Yoshitsune tales, Soga tales, and miscellaneous tales.

- Ancient tales:
  - Chronicle of Japan (日本記, Nihongi)
  - Iruka (入鹿)
  - The Great Woven Cap (大織冠, Taishokukan)
  - The Minister Yurikawa (百合若大臣, Yuriwaka-daijin)
  - Shida (信田)
- Minamoto tales:
  - Manjū (満仲)
  - Kamada (鎌田)
  - Kiso's Supplication (木曾願書, Kiso Gansho)
  - Ibuki (伊吹)
  - The Portent of Dreams (夢合, Yume-awase)
  - The Assemblage of Horsemen (馬揃, Uma zoroe)
  - Beach Outing (浜出, Hamaide)
  - The Nine-holed Shell (九穴貝, Kuketsu no kai)
  - Mongaku (文覚)
  - Nasu no Yoichi (那須与一)
- Heike tales:
  - The Island of Sulphur (硫黄島, Iōgashima)
  - The Island Construction (築島, Tsukishima)
  - Atsumori (敦盛)
  - Kagekiyo (景清)
- Yoshitsune tales:
  - Tokiwa at Fushimi (伏見常盤/伏見常葉, Fushimi Tokiwa)
  - Tokiwa's Dispute (常盤問答/常葉問答, Tokiwa mondō)
  - The Scroll of the Flute (笛之巻, Fue no maki)
  - Chronicle of the Future (未来記, Miraiki)
  - Leaving Kurama (鞍馬出, Kuramade)
  - The Fold of the Eboshi (烏帽子折, Eboshi-ori)
  - Koshigoe (腰越)
  - The Night Attack at Horikawa (堀河夜討, Horikawa youchi)
  - Escape to Shikoku (四国落, Shikoku ochi)
  - Shizuka (静)
  - Togashi (富樫)
  - Search of the Shoulder-trunk (笈探, Oi-sagashi)
  - The Battle of Yashima (八島/屋島, Yashima)
  - Izumi's Fortress (和泉城, Izumigajō)
  - Kiyoshige (清重, Kiyoshige)
  - Takadachi (高館)
- Soga tales:
  - The Reluctance to Slay the Soga Brothers (切兼曽我, Kirikane Soga)
  - The Adulthood Rites of the Soga Brothers (元服曽我, Genbuku Soga)
  - Wada's Wine-feast (和田酒盛, Wada sakamori)
  - The Soga Brothers and the Kosode Shirt (小袖曽我, Kosode Soga)
  - Laud of the Sword (剣讃嘆, Tsurugi sandan)
  - The Night Attack by the Soga Brothers (夜討曽我, Youchi Soga)
  - Slashing the Ten Challengers (十番斬, Jūbangiri)
- Miscellaneous
  - The New Piece (新曲, Shinkyoku)
  - Chang Liang (張良, Chōryō)

== Description of the art ==
Evidentiary documentation is too sparse to provide any detail on how kōwakamai was performed in its inception or during its heyday in the late 16th to the early 17th centuries. In the early period, kōwakamai was not starkly distinguishable from the kusemai: both involved two players and both were apparently interchangeably called "two person dance (二人舞, nininmai), or simply "dance (舞, mai). (Note: Sasano gives a list of records of performances. Some refer to just the "two person dance". One record from Meiō 6 (1497) explicitly states that kōwakamai was a two person dance (Sasano 1943, p. 71).)

The surviving kōwakamai (the form transmitted in the Ōe region) involves three players, the principal tayū and two supporting actors named waki, and shite. (Note: Or tayū, shite, and sashi.) The principal and the supporters were dressed alike, a suwō top, long version of the hakama trouser, and no mask, but they wore different types of eboshi hats. (Note: The principal wore tate eboshi designating higher status, the supporters wore ori eboshi)

The kōwakamai performers do not impersonate characters, and do not "act", they merely narrate the lines spoken by the personae dramatis. Also there are no choreographic movements involved that can be recognized as "dance" in the usual European sense.

=== Kusemai influence ===
Kōwakamai is often assumed to have developed from the kusemai, although some commentators do not think this is firmly established. One basis of making the connection are the records stating kusemai being performed by a certain "Kōwaka-tayū" of Tanaka Village in Echizen Providence. This plausibly referred to Kōwakamaru or one of his immediate successors, so the dance must have been the same thing as kōwakamai, or, a "transitional" form approaching it. Scholars say this is kusemai performed by men is of a "different order" from the dance which is otherwise known as kusemai, namely, the courtesan dance as described by Zeami, or a dance show primarily featuring physically attractive women and boys.

== Restoring the kōwakamai art ==
The Japanese government has designated kōwakamai to be an intangible cultural heritage (ICH) (重要無形民俗文化財, jūyōmukei minzoku bunkazai). The folk custom is practiced in the town Setakamachi Ōe in Miyama City, Fukuoka Prefecture.

Although almost nothing is truly known about how kōwakamai was performed at the time of its greatest popularity, performances are held annually in Japan as part of a local festival of sorts. The instrumental melodic arrangements of eight ballads as well as the method of their oral recitation have been restored by the Kōwakamai Preservation Society in Setakamachi Ōe, Miyama City in Fukuoka Prefecture. On 20 January 2008 "Atsumori", "Takadachi", and "Yōchi Soga" were performed by the Kōwakamai Preservation Society's adult troupe. "Atsumori" was performed by the young adult troupe. And "Hamaide" and "Nihongi" were performed by the elementary school-age troupe. The tale "Atsumori" is particularly well known because of its depiction of Oda Nobunaga. Before Oda departs for the Battle of Okehazama, he does a choreographed dance and recites the famous lines, "Although a man may be alive on earth for fifty years, in heaven those fifty years are but an instant—a dream." This performance of "Atsumori" was also performed in Kyoto by the Kōwakamai Society in February 2009.

At the same time as the Kyoto "Atsumori" performance, "Ataka" was also staged. Both performances were recorded on CD & DVD by the Kyoto City University of the Arts' Research Centre for Japanese Traditional Music.
