= Water-dropper (calligraphy) =

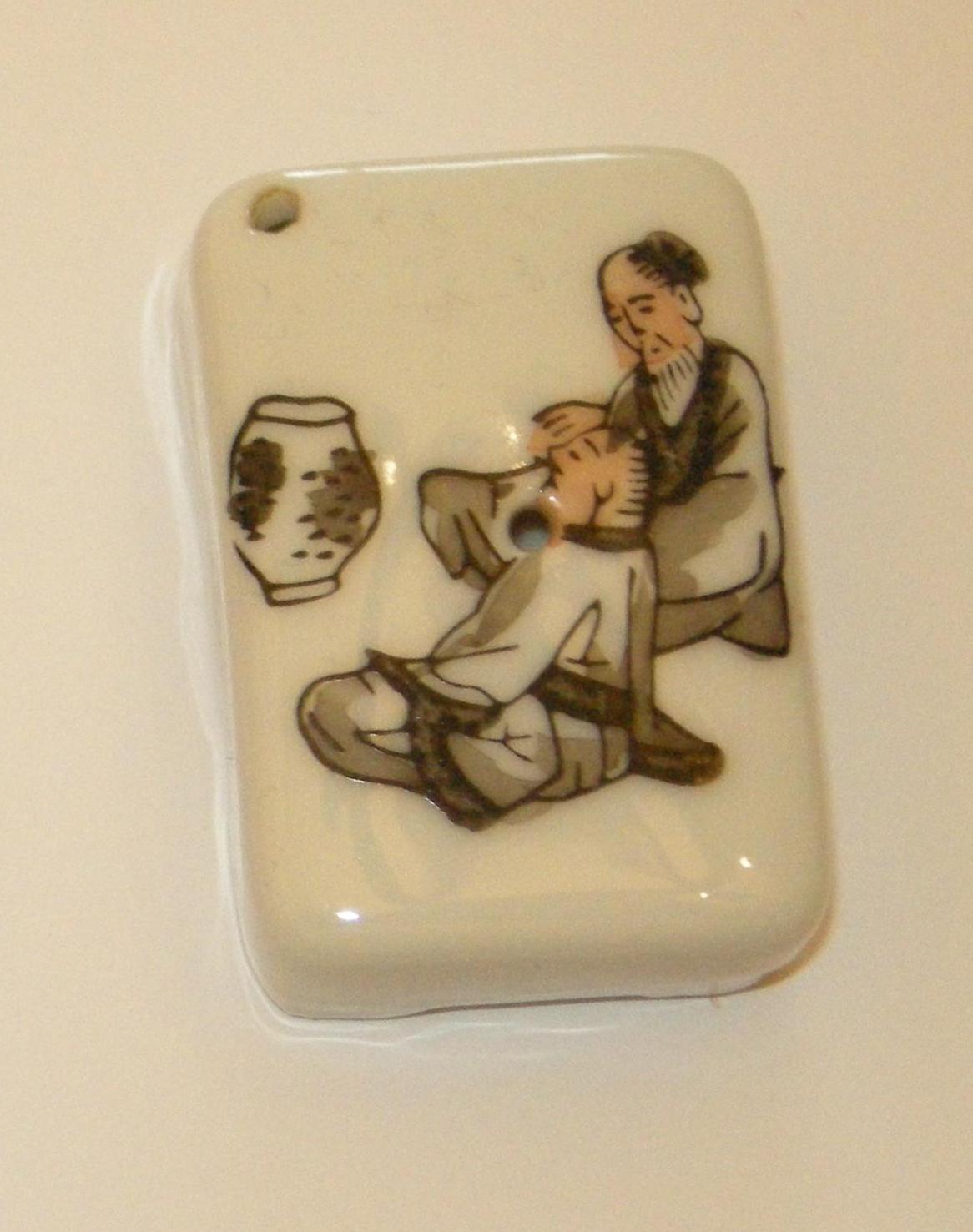
Water-dropper

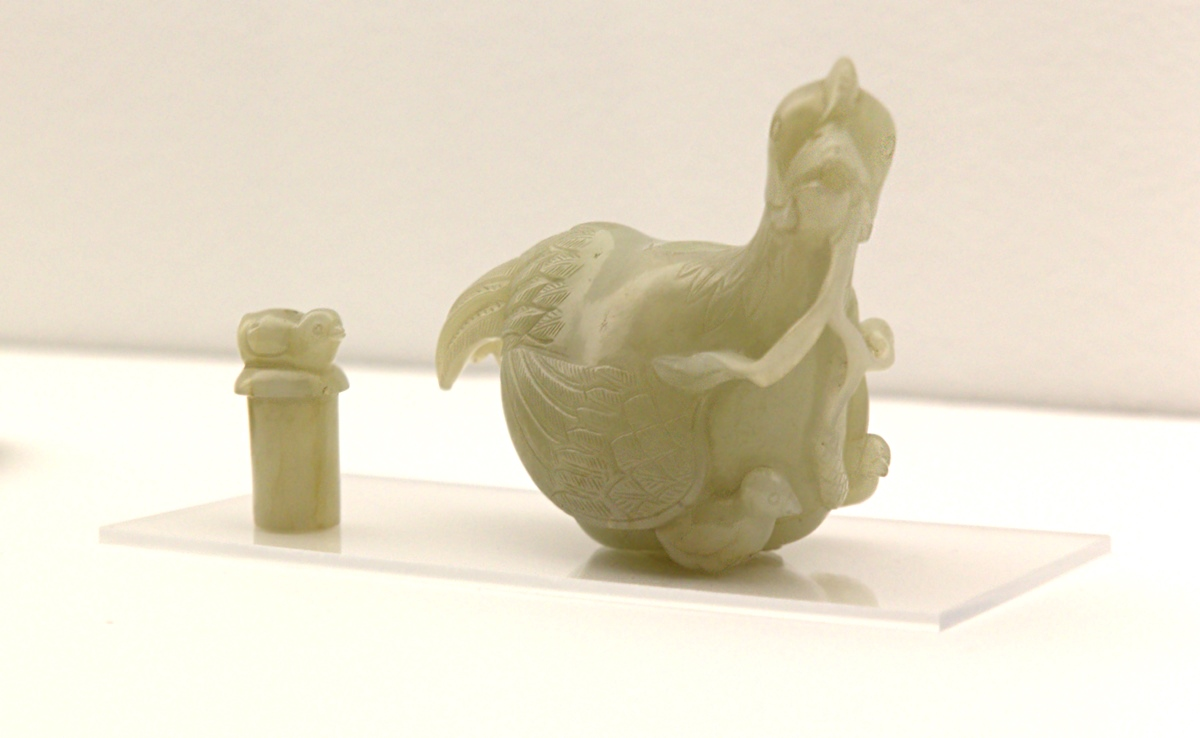
A hen-shaped water dropper

A water-dropper (Japanese: 水滴, Hepburn: suiteki; Chinese: 水滴; pinyin: shuǐdī) is a small device used in East Asian calligraphy as a container designed to hold a small amount of water. In order to make ink a few drops of water are dropped onto the surface of an inkstone. By grinding an inkstick into this water on the inkstone, particles come off and mix with the water, forming ink.

Water-droppers may be made of copper, jade or other stone, or ceramic. A water-dropper has two small holes for water and air, and is designed so that only a few drops of water can fall at one time.

There are a few types of water-droppers.

Type of water-dropper	Hanzi / Kanji	Pinyin	Rōmaji
Water-dropper with pouring spout and a handle	水注	shuǐzhù	suichuu
Water-droppers in diverse forms with large openings	水中丞	shuǐzhōngchéng	suichuujou
Jar-like water-droppers with large opening	水盂	shuǐyú	suiu
Frog shaped water-dropper	蟾蜍	chánchú	senjo
