= Gu Erniang =

Chinese artist

- Known for: Inkstone carving
- Spouse: Gu Qiming

Gu Erniang (Chinese: 顧二娘; fl. 17th – 18th centuries) was a famous Chinese inkstone artist who lived in the Qing dynasty, during the reign of Kangxi Emperor. Throughout her career, she was regarded as the best of her profession in China.

There are at least one dozen surviving inkstones attributed to Gu, but most are likely to be forgeries. No existing inkstone has been proven to have been made by Gu.

There is little existing information on Gu's personal life due to the lack of biographical writing about artisans during the Qing dynasty.

== Life ==
Gu was born to the Zou (Chinese: 鄒) family, possibly around 1664. She married Gu Qiming, the heir to the line of Suzhou inkstone carvers established by his father, Gu Delin, who was highly acclaimed in his trade. Gu likely learned inkstone-making from her husband and father-in-law. Following the passing of Delin and Qiming sometime after 1692, Gu took over the household trade. She attained widespread fame for her inkstones during her career from 1700 to 1722. She adopted two sons; one died prematurely, and the other, Gongwang, did not continue the Gu line of inkstone making. Gu died sometime between 1725 and 1733.

== Career and Artistry ==
Gu's career began following the deaths of her father-in-law and husband, who ran a successful inkstone-making business in Zhuanzhu Lane, Suzhou. Within a handful of years after their deaths, Gu had established herself as the heir of the Gu house and had become very successful in her own right. She was often entrusted with enlarging the ink pool of old inkstones, which was considered the most difficult task for an inkstone carver.

Gu's patrons often wrote poems and encomiums for the inkstones they received from her, which note information about the motifs she used in her work. She is thereby known to have created "warm," "elegant," "refined," and "subtle" inkstones, which have featured knotted designs, phoenix motifs, apricot blossom and swallow motifs, among others. Gu has additionally been quoted describing her approach to inkstone making:

An inkstone is carved from a piece of rock; it would have to become round and lively as well as fat and opulent before the wonders of carving is made apparent. If the inkstone appears dull, dry, emaciated, and stiff, it is in fact the original face of the rock. Then what good did the carving do?

The Gu house of inkstone-making reached would reach peak during Gu Erniang's career. She was considered "peerless in her day." Despite her widespread fame and popularity, some contemporaries viewed Gu with dismissal or suspicion, as women were not thought to be rightful heirs in traditional patrilineage.

== Legacy ==
There are textual records of inkstones created by Gu, mostly from tributes written by her patrons. None of these records indicate that Gu signed her works. However, all existing inkstones attributed to Gu are signed in some way, and these signatures differ greatly from each other. Additionally, no existing inkstone attributed to Gu matches the description of a written record of her work. As a result, most surviving inkstones attributed to Gu are likely to be forgeries. The amount of highly skilled forgeries of Gu's work made during her lifetime is seen as indicative of her fame at the time. The motifs that appear throughout these inkstones also provide insight as to the types of inkstones she was known or thought to produce.

Following Gu's death, forgeries of her works were often engraved with poems that promoted an "ultra-feminine persona," presumably to attract collectors. A popular poem described Gu as having bound feet, which she used to check the quality of stones brought to her; this detail was likely invented to eroticize Gu, and it is not known if her feet were bound in reality. These portrayals of Gu contradict those by her patrons that knew and met with her during her lifetime.

Gu's work continues to be highly prized today; an authentic Gu inkstone is considered a "holy grail" among Chinese inkstone collectors.

== Attributed works ==
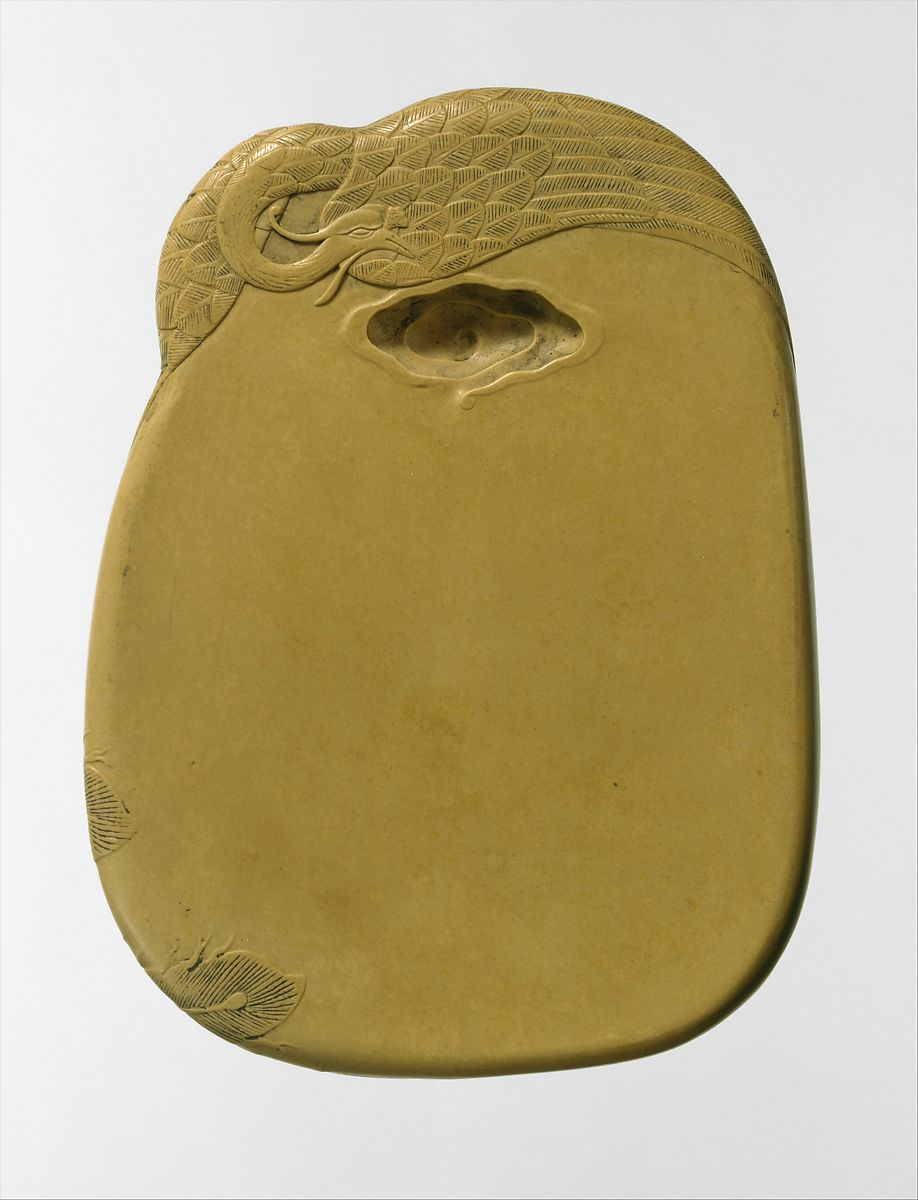
Inkstone with phoenix design (front), Metropolitan Museum of Art

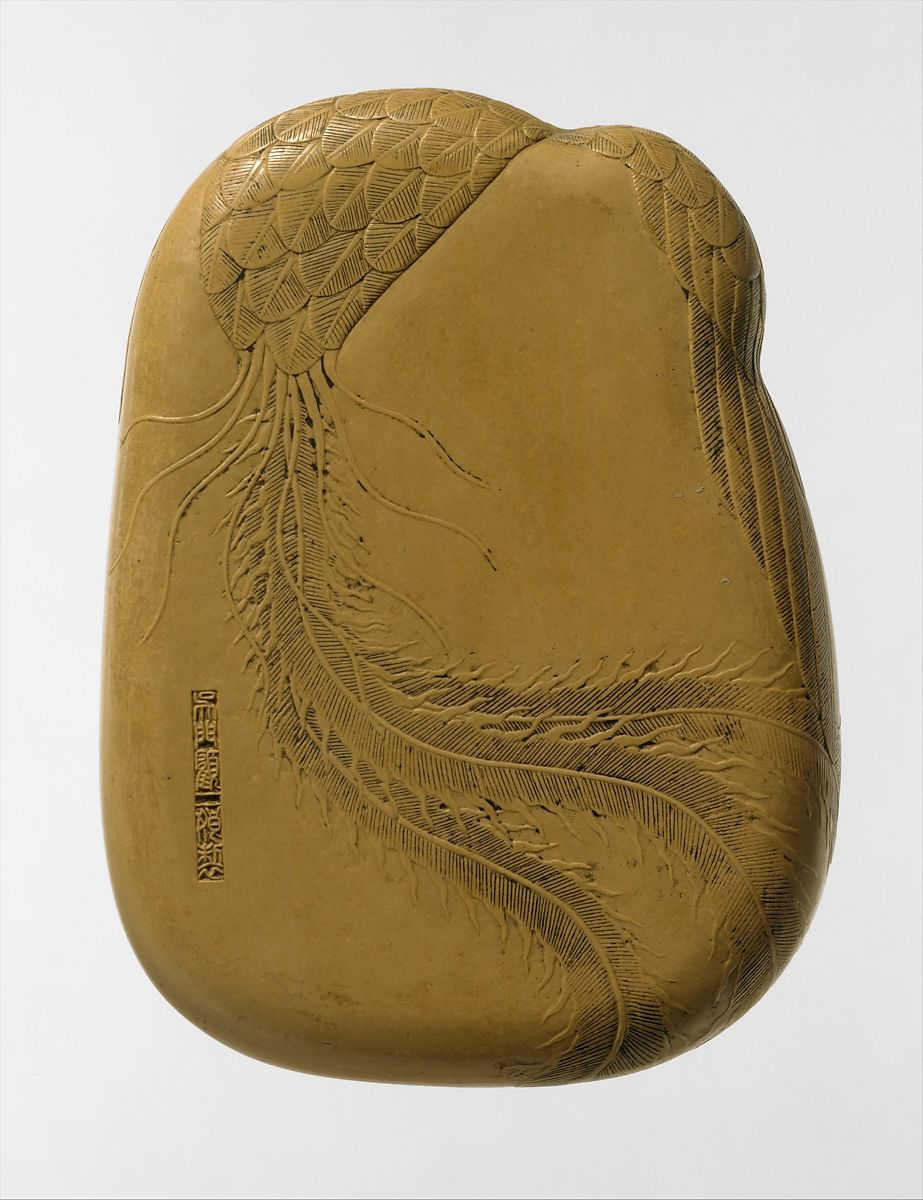
Inkstone with phoenix design (back), Metropolitan Museum of Art
