= Shirabyōshi =

Type of female entertainer in medieval Japan

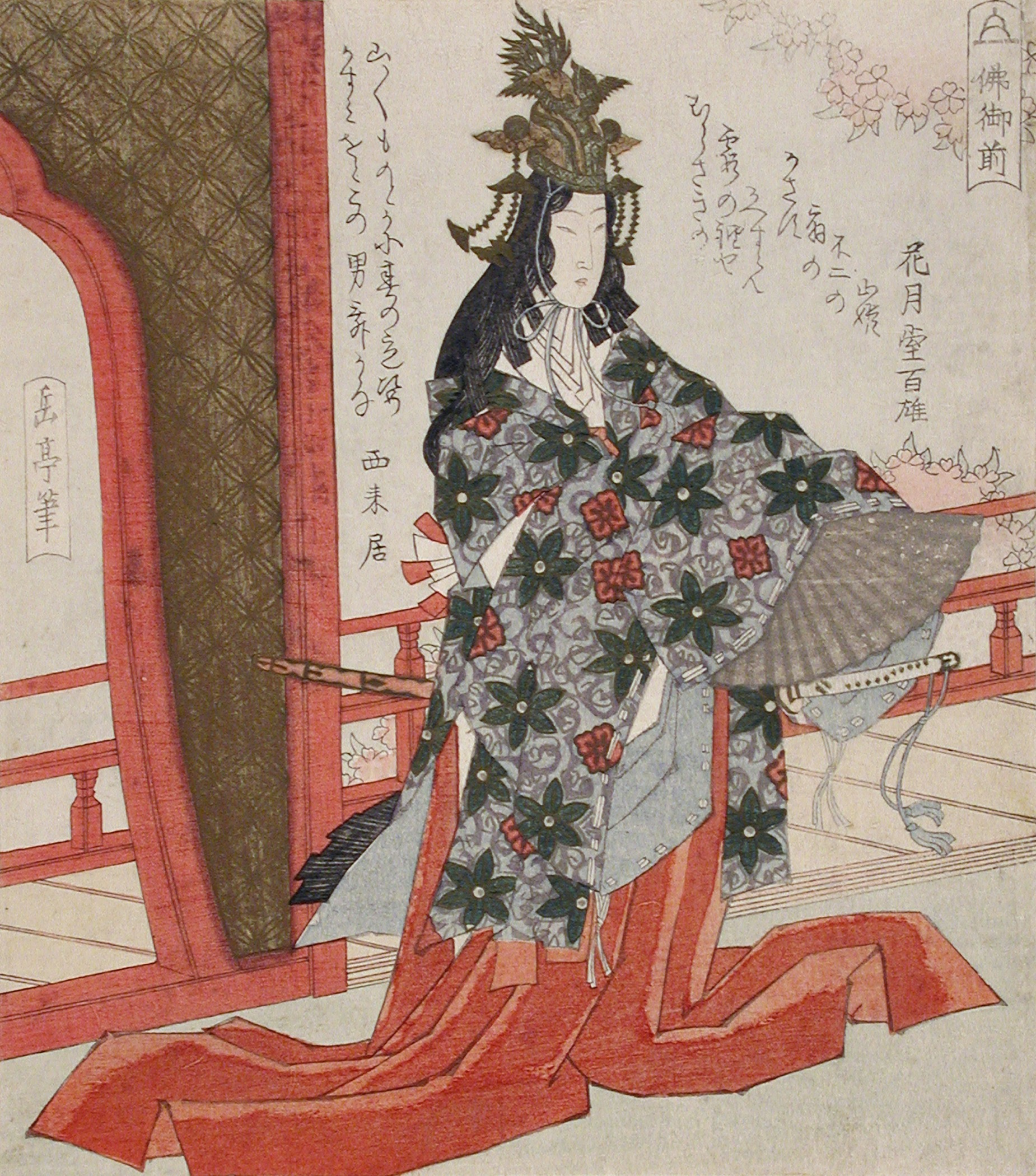
Shirabyōshi Hotoke Gozen performs dance

Shirabyōshi (白拍子) were Japanese female entertainers in the Heian and Kamakura periods who sang songs and performed dances. They danced dressed as men. The profession of shirabyōshi became popular in the 12th century. They would perform for the nobility, and at celebrations. The word shirabyōshi can also refer to the songs they sang and the dances they performed.

They are sometimes referred to as courtesans in the English language, but by nature they were performers. Some shirabyōshi did sometimes sleep with their patrons and give birth to nobles' children, but this was not their intended purpose as entertainers. The best known shirabyōshi were Shizuka Gozen, Giō and Hotoke Gozen, who were featured in The Tale of the Heike.

== History ==
The name shirabyōshi may be interpreted as "white beat" or "simple rhythm"; it may refer to the white suikan robe they wore, or alternatively the hyōshi (拍子) rhythm of the imayō (今様, lit. 'trendy') songs that they sang and danced to, which were also performed by asobi. Shira (白) means "white", although scholars believe that it should be interpreted as "plain" (素; also pronounced shira); in this interpretation shirabyōshi therefore refers to the lack of musical accompaniment apart from the rhythmic hyōshi percussion.

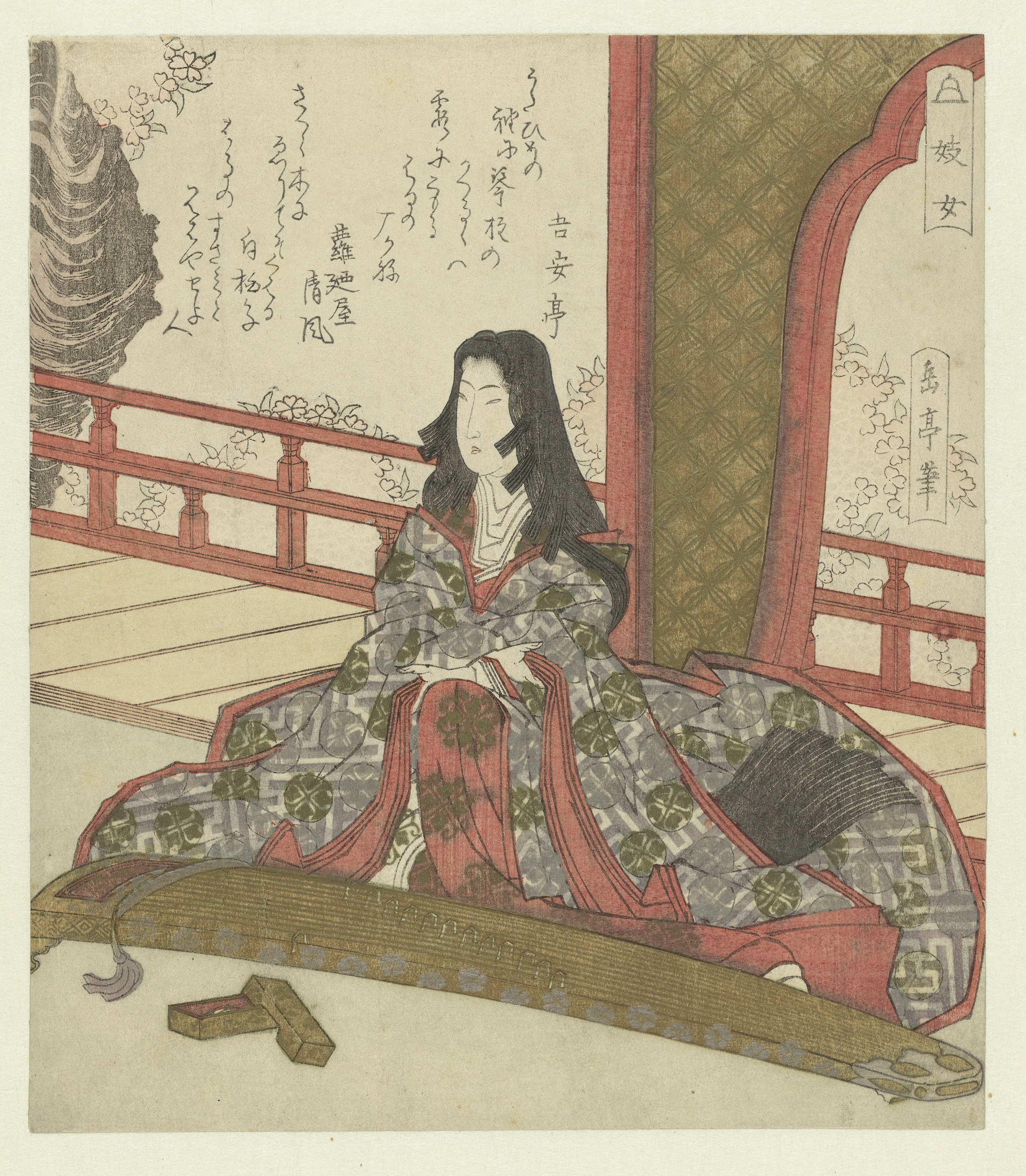
Shirabyōshi Gijo playing the Zither

Shirabyōshi appeared during the mid-Heian period (794–1185). During a time of transition of power and societal change, a change in fortune for some aristocratic families resulted in the daughters of these families needing to perform as shirabyōshi in order to survive. As educated and cultured ladies, they become a superior group of entertainers noted for their singing, dancing and poetry as well as beauty. Shirabyōshi became popular as entertainers in the 12th century, and many women then chose to be shirabyōshi because of their popularity. A shirabyōshi was always a woman who dressed in men's attire. They were popular in the late Heian and early Kamakura period in the 12th century, but during the 13th century, their status declined. They disappeared around the end of the Kamakura or the beginning of the Muromachi period in the 14th century.

It has been said that the shirabyōshi culture greatly influenced Noh drama by bringing forth kusemai, an unorthodox form of dancing, and introducing it to Noh.

== Attire and appearance ==
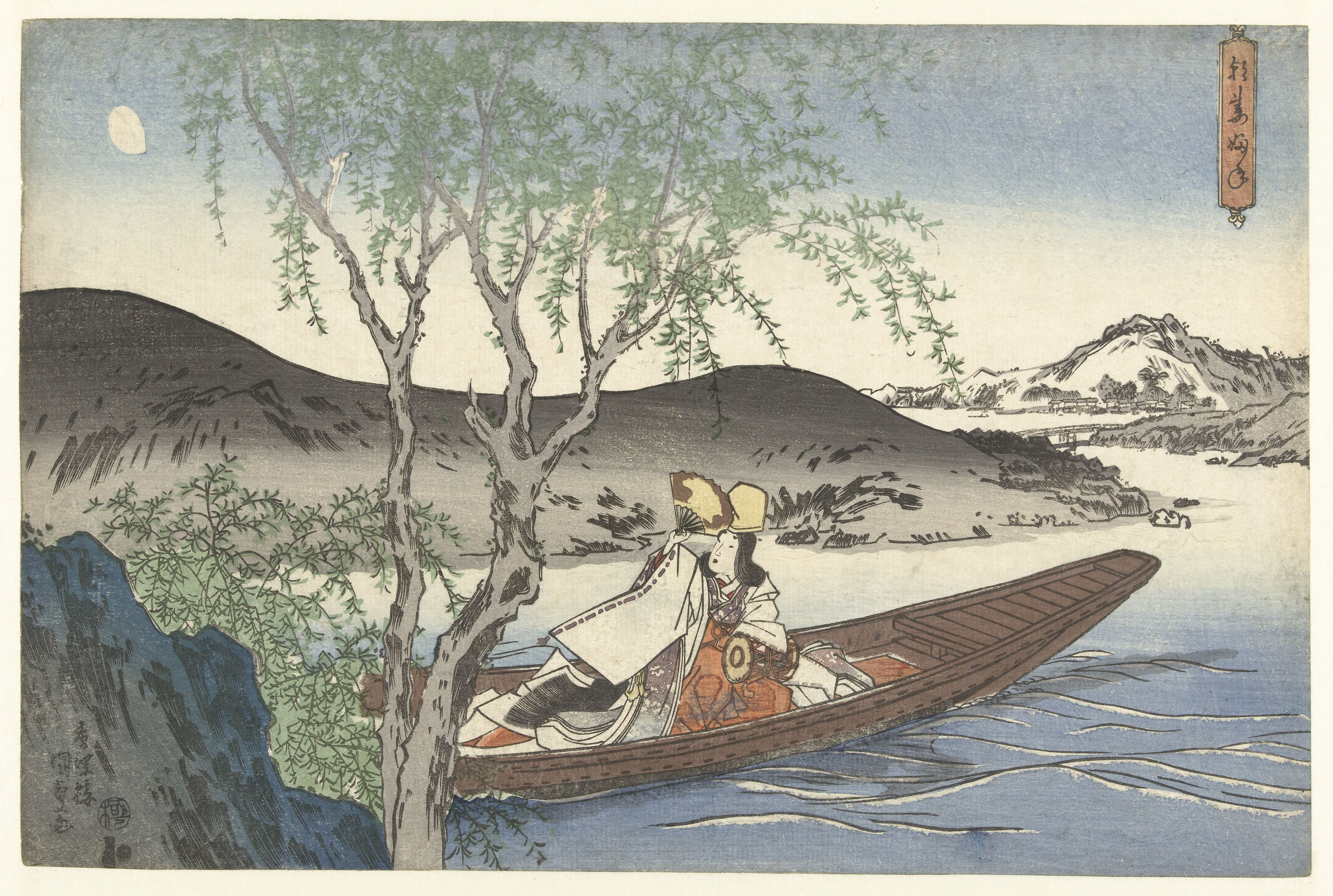
Shirabyōshi dancer in Asazuma boot

Shirabyōshi were recognizable for their clothing, which was Shinto-inspired. It was a man's outfit and featured the following:

- A tate-eboshi hat; tall black hat worn at court
- A tachi a samurai's sword
- Red hakama, worn primarily by men
- White suikan and red suikan, a male Shinto outfit
- A kawahori hand fan, which men carried

Shirabyōshi also wore oshiroi, white face makeup. This would cover their face and neck, and their eyebrows would be painted higher on the forehead (hikimayu). Their hair was worn simply, and was left long and pulled back into a loose ponytail secured with a ribbon called a takenaga.

The tate-eboshi hat and the sword were only worn by shirabyōshi in the early period, and in later eras, they danced only in white suikan, which gave rise to the belief that shirabyōshi were named after the robe they wore.

== Music ==
Shirabyōshi songs were mostly based on Buddhist prayers. The songs were usually slow and rhythmic, with great meaning in the words. They also would sing imayō songs, which were poems using images of nature to convey meanings of circumstances in their lives. These songs typically had lines of seven and five syllables. Trademarks of their music included their voices, the drum and the flute.

== Famous shirabyōshi ==
=== Shizuka ===
Shizuka, commonly referred to as Shizuka Gozen, was the concubine and lover of Minamoto no Yoshitsune, the tragic hero of many folk legends. She was possibly born in 1168, and is popular in folk legends herself. She and Yoshitsune met and fell in love, but by the time she had become pregnant, Yoshitsune was on the run for his life. Shizuka was captured and taken to the shōgun, Minamoto no Yoritomo in Kamakura, Yoshitsune's older brother. There she gave birth to a son, who was, according to some versions of the tales, promptly killed by his uncle Yoritomo, but survived in others.

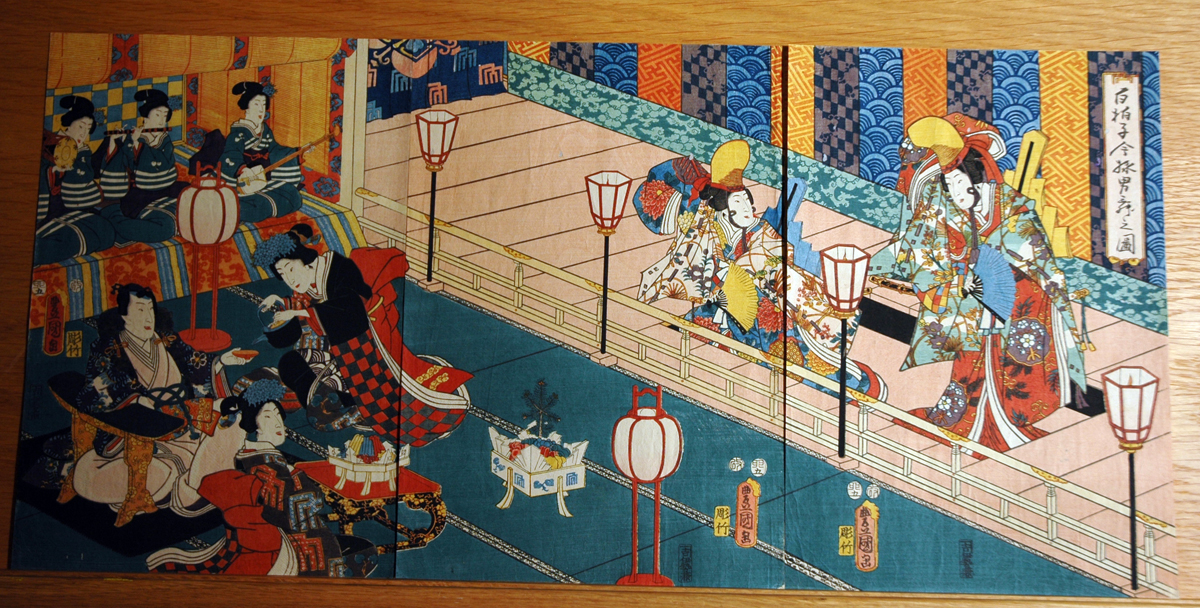
Picture of a Stylish Man's Shirabyoshi Dance

In some tales, Shizuka was then forced to perform a dance for Yoritomo and his wife Hōjō Masako at a temple celebration, where she sang a song of praise for her lover Yoshitsune. This greatly angered Yoritomo, and he intended on having her put to death but Masako begged for her life. Shizuka was freed and sought to follow Yoshitsune, but she learned of his death. She became a nun and died in 1189. Her song is famous and is still sung today by geisha.

=== Giō and Hotoke ===
The story of Giō and Hotoke, featured in the Tale of the Heike, tells of the most famous shirabyōshi, Giō, who had won the heart of Taira no Kiyomori, being ousted by a younger and more talented shirabyōshi named Hotoke. Kiyomori cruelly sent Giō away, which greatly grieved her, and Hotoke was constantly ridden with guilt.

A year later, Giō was asked to perform a dance for Hotoke at Kiyomori's command, who actually intended on humiliating her. In her grief and humiliation, Giō, her sister, and their mother became Buddhist nuns seeking a happier life. A few years later, the guilt was too great for Hotoke, and she too became a nun. She asked for forgiveness from Giō, who willingly forgave her, and the four women lived out the rest of their days in prayer.

== See also ==
- Asobi
