= Otomae =

Japanese singer (1085–1169)

Otomae (乙前; 1085 – 1169) was a Japanese singer. She was a virtuoso performer of the popular songs of that period – imayō (今様) – and was the foremost authority on the form, which had been passed down through generations of female teachers. In her seventies, she passed on her knowledge to the seventy-seventh emperor, Go-Shirakawa, who collected the works in the popular anthology, Songs to Make the Dust Dance on the Beams (Ryōjin Hishō 梁塵秘抄).
