= Eguchi =

Eguchi (written: 江口) is a Japanese surname. Notable people with the surname include:

- Akira Eguchi, pianist
- Fujie Eguchi (江口 冨士枝, born 1932), Japanese table tennis player
- Hisashi Eguchi, manga artist
- Katsuya Eguchi, video game designer
- Takahito Eguchi, video game composer
- Takuya Eguchi, voice actor
- Yoshinori (Yazo) Eguchi, of Kyushin Ryu Jujutsu
- Yōsuke Eguchi, actor

== See also ==
- Eguchi (play), a Noh play
- Eguchi Station, train station in Higashimiyoshi
