= Ryōjin Hishō =

Collection of Japanese folk songs

The Ryōjin Hishō (梁塵秘抄; Songs to Make the Dust Dance on the Beams) is an anthology of imayō 今様 songs. Originally it consisted of two collections joined by Cloistered Emperor Go-Shirakawa: the Kashishū 歌詞集 and the Kudenshū 口伝集. The works were probably from the repertoire of the Emperor's tutor, the aged singer Otomae, whose superlative mastery of the art derived from four generations of teachers. Only a fragment (about 10%) of this work is still extant. These songs were very popular in the 12th century Japan, but quickly fell into disuse in the Kamakura period.
