= Houdian writing brush =

Houdian writing brush or Houdian-Maobi (simplified Chinese: 侯店毛笔; traditional Chinese: 侯店毛筆; pinyin: Hóu-Diàn Máo-Bǐ; "Máo-Bǐ" here means "ink brush"), is a famous kind of ink brushes in China. Along with Huzhou ink brushes, Xuan writing brushes, and Daiyuexuan writing brushes, Houdian ink brushes are among the four most famous.

== History ==
Houdian is a small village in Hubei Province. The activities of manufacturing and producing ink brushes already started in the Ming dynasty. The earliest historic record can be traced back to 1404.

In the Qing dynasty (1644–1911), Houdian ink brushes were largely flourished, especially during the Guangxu era.

== The brushes ==
Houdian brushes have more than 270 different kinds in total. In history, it was more used in traditional Chinese paintings, especially in shan shui paintings.

== See also ==
- Daiyuexuan writing brush: another famous kind of brush.
- Four Treasures of the Study
- Huzhou ink brush: another famous kind of brush.
- Ink brush
- Xuan paper
- Xuan writing brush: another famous kind of brush.
