= Daiyuexuan writing brush =

Daiyuexuan writing brush (simplified Chinese: 戴月轩笔; traditional Chinese: 戴月軒筆; pinyin: Dài-yuè-xuān Bǐ; "Bǐ" means "ink brush"), is a famous brand of ink brush pens in China.

== History ==
The brand was first created by brush pen maker Dai Yuexuan (simplified Chinese: 戴月轩; traditional Chinese: 戴月軒; pinyin: Dài Yuè-Xuān) in Beijing in Late-Qing Dynasty. Dai Yuexuan was a professional craftsman of making ink brushes, and he was originally from Zhejiang Province. Dai learned the techniques from Huzhou, also a city in Zhejiang. Huzhou is very famous of its ink brush-making, and was the largest center of ink brush manufacture and production during that time. Ink brushes made in Huzhou are finely names as Hubi (Huzhou ink brushes).

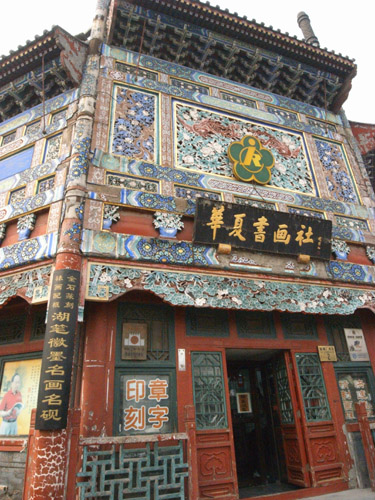
Liulichang, Beijing, where Dai Yuexuan first founded his own business of making ink brushes

Dai went to North China to develop his own business, and finally settled in Beijing, the capital of China. In 1916, Dai opened a shop in Liulichang, Beijing, and it was specialized in ink brush business, including manufacturing, producing, repairing, collecting, and introducing related knowledge and techniques of ink brushes. The shop later would become an ink brush company, and today it's still there in Liulichang (now a cultural district), Beijing.

== The brushes ==
The Daiyuexuan ink brushes are most often seen made of goat hair. In the early production, the goat hair was from South China, especially from Jiaxing, Zhejiang Province.

== Trivial ==
Many top politicians in Beijing are users of Daiyuexuan ink brushes. Chairman Mao Zedong and Premier Zhou Enlai were both long-time users of Daiyuexuan ink brushes, and in Beijing they only used Daiyuexuan brushes.

== See also ==
- Four Treasures of the Study
- Huzhou ink brush: another famous kind of brush.
- Ink brush
- Xuan paper
- Xuan writing brush: another famous kind of brush.
