= Qingtian stone carving =

Chinese traditional stone carving craft

- Sharing the Bright Moon at Home — Work by Xia Furen, 2006
- Chinese: 青田石雕
- Literal meaning: Qingtian stone carving
Transcriptions
Standard Mandarin
- Hanyu Pinyin: Qīngtián shídiāo
- Wade–Giles: Ch'ing-t'ien shih-tiao
Wu
- Romanization: chin1-dia2-zyq8-tiuao1

Qingtian stone carving (Chinese: 青田石雕; pinyin: qīngtián shídiāo; Wugniu: chin1-dia2-zyq8-tiuao1) is a traditional stone carving craft originating from Qingtian County, Zhejiang, China. It is mainly made of the eponymous Qingtian stone (青田石), a rare silicate rock widely regarded as one of the "Four Famous Stones" of China. Its creation requires special attention to the material and is especially known for the technique of "qiaose" (巧色), or the ingenious and artful use of natural colors, textures, and qualities. It is an important part of Chinese seal-stone culture and literati tradition.

The craft of Qingtian stone carving is generally believed to have taken shape during the Tang and Song periods, and entered a period of prosperity during the Ming and Qing dynasties. From the 14th century onwards, Qingtian stone carving gradually grew from a local folk craft into a systematically manufactured commodity, and disseminated both within China and overseas through trade, international exhibitions, and networks of the Chinese diaspora.

After the founding of the People's Republic of China, Qingtian stone carvings were repeatedly exhibited at domestic and international arts-and-crafts exhibitions, and were also used as state gifts in cultural diplomacy. In 2006, Qingtian stone carving was listed in the first batch of China's National Intangible Cultural Heritage.

== History ==
=== Early history ===
A Qingtian stone seal from Qing era, preserved by Suzhou Museum

The use of Qingtian stone as a carving material has a history of more than a thousand years in Qingtian. The Chinese mythic work Classic of Mountains and Seas (山海經) records that the region between the sacred mountains of Ju (櫃山) and Qiwu (漆吳山) once had abundant deposits of jade-like stones, which some later scholars have associated with Qingtian in southern Zhejiang. The earliest surviving relic of Qingtian stone carving is usually identified as a small recumbent pig excavated from a Six-Dynasties period (220-589 AD) tomb and now preserved in the Zhejiang Provincial Museum.

During the Yuan dynasty, Zhao Mengfu is said to have selected Qingtian dengguangdong (燈光凍) stone as a material for seal carving for most of his life as a painter and calligrapher, indicating that Qingtian stone was already appreciated by seal carvers and literati of traditional Chinese society. By the Yuan and Ming periods, Qingtian stone carving had begun to develop as a craft. Artisans used Qingtian stone to produce brush holders, incense burners, Buddhist figures, animals and other objects, and the craft gradually spread among local communities of Qingtian.

During the Qing dynasty, Qingtian stone was used not only as decorative objects but also imperial and scholarly purposes. In 1790, for the Qianlong Emperor's eightieth birthday, the cohort of local bureaucrats led by He Shen and Jin Jian in Suzhou commissioned sets of Qingtian stone seals carved with auspicious characters such as "fortune" (福) and "longevity" (壽) as tribute gifts. The Qingtian County Gazetteer (青田縣志) from Guangxu period (1875-1908) also records the local importance of stone quarrying and carving in Qingtian.

By the late Qing period, stone carving had become an important industry in Qingtian. Numerous workshops sprouted in the local townships of Shankou (山口), Fangshan (方山), and Youzhu (油竹), which had greatly expanded the range of the craft and it into an organized commercial endeavour. This development produced a group of merchants specializing in the sale of Qingtian stone carvings, laying the foundation for the later domestic and overseas circulation of the craft.

=== Domestic and overseas circulation ===
From the 19th century onward, many people from Qingtian began to emigrate abroad. Early Qingtianese migrants discovered that the craftsmanship and designs of their stone carvings attracted the interest of many foreign consumers, and used the carvings as commodities to open overseas markets and expand their influence abroad. According to the Manual of the Panama-Pacific International Exposition (巴拿馬賽會說明書):

Since the stone became known to the world, it has been made into elegant objects for the scholar's studio, seals used by literati, and small curios. Because its price was high, however, its sales were limited. In the 18th year of Guangxu reign (1893), Ji Zhaowang and six other merchants from Shankou village sold stone products in the isles of Nanyang and India, then travelled as far as France, where their business became increasingly successful. Their example was followed by others, who came to regard overseas trade as a promising occupation and looked upon distant foreign lands as if they were marketplaces in the neighbouring villages.

==== International exhibitions ====
Between the mid-19th century to the early 20th century, Qingtian stone carvings appeared several times at major domestic and international fairs and exhibitions.

- In 1900, the Qing government spent 150,000 taels of silver to build an exhibition hall at the Exposition Universelle where Qingtian stone carvings were permitted to be sold wholesale.
- In 1904, Chen Qi, a native of Qingtian, attended the Louisiana Purchase Exposition in St. Louis as a Qing imperial commissioner, together with more than twenty fellow townsmen including Lin Zhuzhai and Fu Tingkui, bring Qingtian stone carvings for exhibition.
- In 1905, Qingtianese merchants including Wu Qiankui and Lin Zicai brought stone carvings and other goods to the Liège International Exposition in Belgium, where they won a bronze medal.
- In 1910, the 2nd year of Xuantong reign, Qingtian stone carvings were exhibited at the Nanyang Industrial Exposition in Nanking and won a silver medal.
- In 1915, after the completion of the Panama Canal, the United States held the Panama Pacific International Exposition. Chen Qi was appointed by the Yuan Shikai government as supervisor of China's participation and director of the preparatory bureau, and the exhibited Qingtian stone carvings won a silver medal.

==== Era of prosperity ====
The Qingtian stone carving store owned by Zhou Xuqin and Zhou Zhishan in New York, 1916

The expansion of overseas markets promoted the rapid growth in the production of Qingtian stone carving. From 1920 to 1936, the craft entered a flourishing period. According to contemporary records, by the late Qing period, there were more than one thousand stone carvers in Qingtian. A 1931 field survey by Wang Heng, an investigator of the Zhejiang Provincial Design Association, estimated that Qingtian stone carvings were produced at about 10,000 boxes per year, with ordinary, medium-grade and special-grade boxes priced at around 30, 60, and 120 Chinese yuan respectively. The annual output value was estimated at about 700,000 yuan. Nearly one hundred people were engaged specificially in quarrying, while more than 2,100 people worked primarily as carvers.

During the Republican period, shops which specialized in selling Qingtian stone carvings were established in major cities along China's southeastern coast, including Wenzhou, Putuo, Shanghai, and Nanjing. Many of these shops also maintained their own workshops, employing stone carvers and combining production with sales. According to the 1933 Records of Chinese Industry (中國實業志), there were 70 to 80 stone-carving workshops in Qingtian and Wenzhou at the time, with the largest workshops employing nearly 40 artisans. Male workers accounted for about three quarters of the workforce, while female workers accounted for the remaining one quarter.

Up until the eve of the Second Sino-Japanese War, Shanghai had the largest consumer market for Qingtian stone carvings. The products sold there included ornamental objects such as flower vases, flowerpots, brush racks, miniature landscapes, folding screens, brush washers, figure and Buddhist images, and seals. Because Shanghai was then China's leading treaty-port city and was connected to Wenzhou by regular steamship services, Qingtian stone carvings intended for markets in Europe, the United States and Southeast Asia were generally first shipped to Shanghai. From there, they were exported by stone-carving merchants, including shops such as Jinyuxiang Bookshop (金玉相圖書店), Qishizhai (奇石齋) and Dongshi Company (凍石公司) mainly clustered in the area around Yu Garden.

=== Since 1949 ===
Following the establishment of the People's Republic of China, the industry of Qingtian stone carvings, which had been left in desolation during the Sino-Japanese War and Chinese Civil War, began to recover. Craftsmen that were displaced or forced out of their occupation gradually returned to the craft during the early years of the People's Republic. The resumption of stability helped to bring number of people engaged in Qingtian stone carving from only 35 in 1953 to 486 in 1956.

Qingtian stone carvings were subsequently used on a number of occasions as state gifts and for diplomatic exchanges. In 1956, works of Qingtian stone carving were presented as state gifts to Kliment Voroshilov, Chairman of the Presidium of the Supreme Soviet of the Soviet Union, and Sukarno, President of Indonesia, during their visits to Hangzhou.

Craftsman Lin Rukui and his artwork "Sorghum"

In May 1964, Chinese poet and historian Guo Moruo visited the Qingtian stone-carving factory and composed a poem praising the craft:

青田有奇石，壽山足比肩。
雕琢青如玉，五彩競相宣。
…… 建國亦猶此，鼓動著先鞭。

Qingtian possesses wondrous stone, Shoushan stands as its equal.
Carved like jade, its colours gleam in splendid harmony.
…
Such is the building of the nation, urged forward by the beating of drums.

==== Cultural Revolution ====
In the winter of 1966, after the outbreak of the Cultural Revolution, many stone carvings depicting classical and traditional subjects were destroyed after being denounced as expressions of the "Four Olds" (四旧), and as "reactionary" works propagating the feudal ideals of "loyal ministers and worthy generals" (忠臣良将) and "talented scholars and beautiful women" (才子佳人). From 1967 to 1969, as like the factional conflicts in most of China at the time, Qingtian too was also torn apart by the local rebel factions named "Gongnongbing" (工农兵) and "Qinggezong" (青革总), and the violent struggles between the two mutually hostile camps had brought severe disruption to the production of stone carvings, some workshops in the town were, at one point, even seized and occupied as factional strongholds.

Spring is Everywhere in China —— Zhang Aiting, 1972

The industry gradually resumed thereafter. Works during this era emphasized overtly Maoist political and ideological themes, with state-approved revolutionary operas and narratives becoming major subjects. Production expanded substantially in the later years of the Cultural Revolution as society moved on from early chaos and China's international relations improved, although it continued to be interrupted by later political campaigns such as Criticize Lin, Criticize Confucius. During Richard Nixon's 1972 visit to China, 500 Qingtian stone carvings of small elephants which symbolize the Republican Party were ordered and shipped back to the United States.

==== Reform and opening up ====
With the fall of the Gang of Four in 1976, Qingtian stone carving entered a renewed period of recovery and development. By the early 1980s, it had once again been incorporated into national arts-and-crafts exhibitions, award programmes, and media coverage.

Ball Vase — Zhu Zhenliang, 1980

In May 1978, during a visit to the Democratic People's Republic of Korea by Hua Guofeng, Chairman of the Chinese Communist Party (CCP), the Qingtian stone carving Herd of Horses (群马) was chosen as a state gift and presented to North Korean leader Kim II Sung. Thereafter, Qingtian stone carvings were frequently exhibited at arts-and-crafts exhibitions in China and abroad, and received awards including the Hundred Flowers Award for Chinese Arts and Crafts (中国工艺美术百花奖).

On 15th December, 1992, China's Ministry of Posts and Telecommunications issued a set of special postage stamps entitled Qingtian Stone Carving, depicting Spring (春), Sorghum (高粱), Bumper Harvest (丰收), and Flowers in Full Moon (花好月圆). In the same year, Qingtian held a ceremony marking the first issue of the stamps as well as the inaugural Qingtian Stone Carving Cultural Festival (青田石雕文化节). These events further expanded the presence of Qingtian stone carving beyond the handicraft field into and the popular culture of China.

In 2004, Qingtian stone carving was listed in the first batch of representative works of provincial intangible cultural heritage of Zhejiang, and was subsequently listed among Zhejiang's nominations for the first national list of intangible cultural heritage. In May 20th, 2006, Qingtian stone carving was formally included in the first national list of intangible cultural heritage of China. 7 artisans specializing in the field were awarded the honorary title Master of Chinese Arts and Crafts by the Chinese State Council.

At the 2010 Shanghai World Expo, 195 Qingtian stone portrait seals were presented to participating dignitaries. At the 2014 APEC summit in Beijing, each of the 21 participating heads of state or government received a Qingtian seal.

In recent years, the study and dissemination of Qingtian stone carving have become increasingly institutionalized. The establishment of the Qingtian Stone Carving Research Centre, a research base for Qingtian seal studies, specialist journals, and related publications has contributed to the systematic cataloguing of carving techniques and their transmission to the wider public. Programmes produced by China Central Television (CCTV), including Treasure Hunt (寻宝), Travel Across China (走遍中国), Exploration and Discovery (探索·发现), and National Treasure Archives (国宝档案), have also featured Qingtian stone carving on several occasions.

== Material ==
A stone carver polishing a work at the Qingtian Stone Carving Museum

Qingtian stone carving primarily derives its materials from the eponymous Qingtian stone, a fine-grained silicate stone known for its smooth texture and highly diverse range of colors, including green, white, yellow, red, black and blue. Some varieties display translucent areas, natural veining, or several colors within a single piece, making them ideal for the crafting of seals, scholar's objects, and ornamental carving. Since individual stones vary greatly in hardness, translucency, color and texture, designs are generally conceived and adapted to the material itself, arranging subjects and compositions according to the stone's natural shape and distribution of colors, an approach that forms the basis of the technique known as "qiaose" (巧色), or the skillful use of color.

Qingtian stone occurs in numerous varieties. Well-known examples include Dengguangdong (灯光冻), Fengmengqing (封门青), Huangjinyao (黄金耀), Lanxing (蓝星), Tanggu Huangbaidong (塘古黄白冻), Hongmudong (红木冻), and Xiaoshundong (小顺冻) quarried in the nearby Yunhe County. Dengguangdong is prized for its translucent texture and soft lustre and is often regarded as one of the finest varieties of Qingtian stone. Fengmengqing has a rich green color and is particularly suited to seal carving. Multicolored stones, meanwhile, are frequently used for compositions depicting figures, birds-and-flowers, or landscapes, allowing carvers to emphasize contrasts and gradations between different layers of colors.

== Gallery ==
Butterfly Lovers — Yang Chuzhao, 1982

Three Monkeys — Chen Jingping, 1999

Underwater World — Chen Xiaofu

A granite sculpture of a galloping horse, crafted using Qingtian stone carving techniques, at the Huajiachi Campus of Zhejiang University

Zhejiang Agricultural University (now the Huajiachi Campus of Zhejiang University): A record of the inscription "Benteng" (奔腾: Galloping) by Chen Yun and the galloping horse sculpture
