= Lüzu Temple =

Taoist temple in Xicheng, Beijing, China

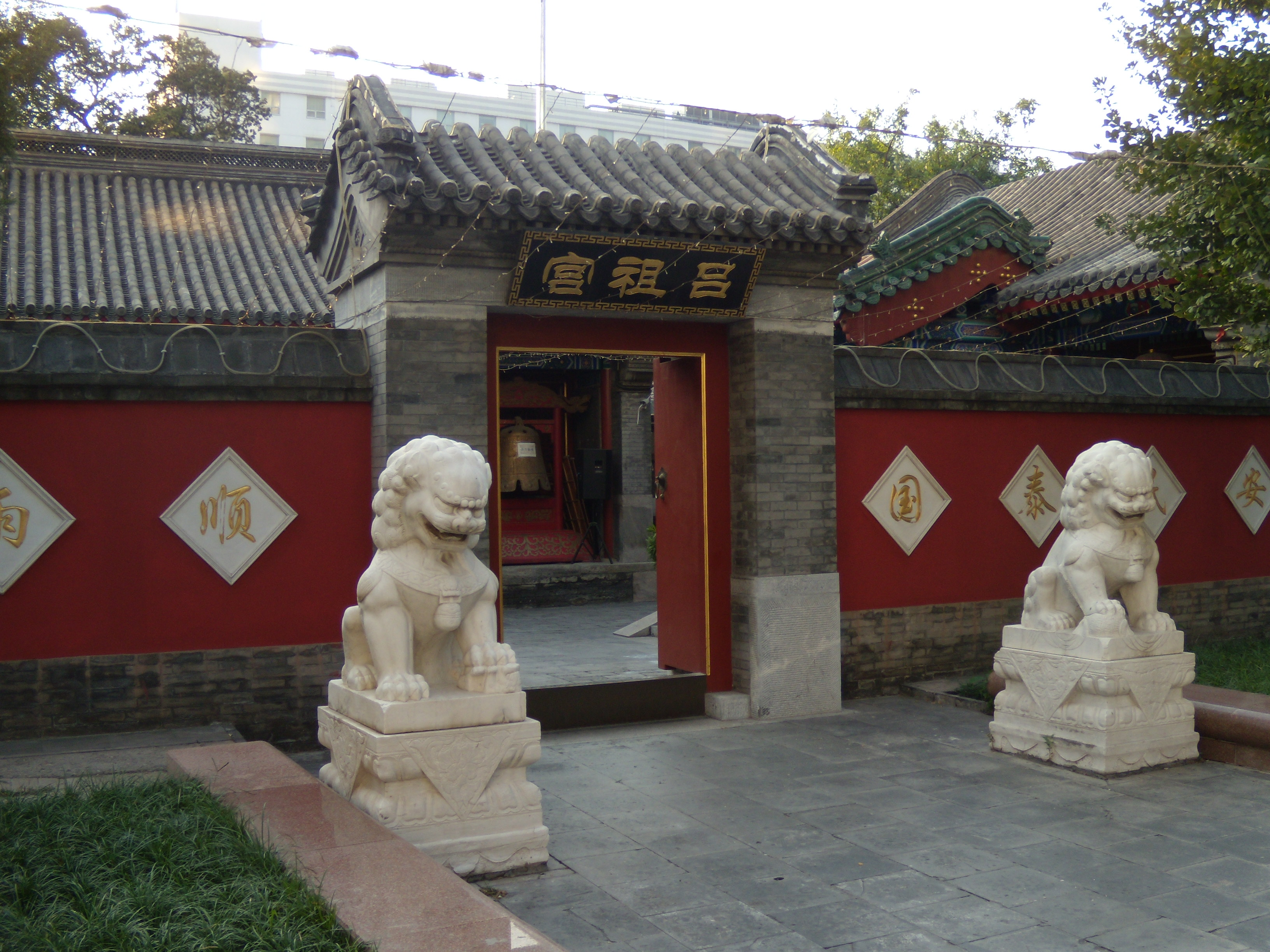
Entrance to the Lüzu Temple

The Lüzu Temple (吕祖宫) is a Taoist temple in Beijing, China. Built during the Qing dynasty, it is located near the Liulichang quarter in the old city.
