= Smoke and mirrors =

Metaphor

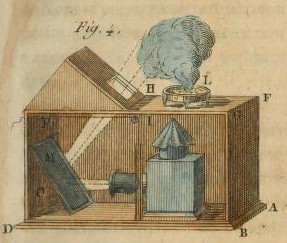
Projecting an image onto smoke with a mirror, from Nouvelles récréations physiques et mathématiques (1770)

Smoke and mirrors is a classic technique in magical illusions that makes an entity appear to hover in empty space. It was documented as early as 1770 and spread widely after its use by the charlatan Johann Georg Schröpfer, who claimed to conjure spirits. It subsequently became a fixture of 19th-century phantasmagoria shows. The illusion relies on a hidden projector (known then as a magic lantern) whose beam reflects off a mirror into a cloud of smoke, which in turn scatters the beam to create an image.

== Idiom ==
The phrase "smoke and mirrors" has entered North American English to refer to "obscuring or embellishing of the truth of a situation with misleading or irrelevant information." The earliest known use of the idiom came from the biography How the Good Guys Finally Won: Notes from an Impeachment Summer, published in 1975. It was written by the American political journalist Jimmy Breslin, who reported the Watergate political scandal in Washington first-hand. Breslin described politics as the theatrical use of "mirrors and blue smoke" to make people see what they wish to see. The idiom was flipped and shortened to its current form and had become a common term in politics by the end of the 1970s.

== See also ==
- Mirror Flower, Water Moon
- Pepper's ghost
- Theatrical smoke and fog
