= Mirror Flower, Water Moon =

Chinese idiomatic expression

Mirror Flower, Water Moon (simplified Chinese: 镜花水月; traditional Chinese: 鏡花水月; pinyin: Jìnghuā Shuǐyuè; literally "Mirror Flower, Water Moon"), is a Chinese proverb/phrase (chengyu), also known elsewhere in East Asia (for example, as a Japanese yojijukugo.) The idiom can be rendered in English as "flower in the mirror, moon on the water", suggesting things that can be seen but not touched, being reflected in mirrors or the surface of still water; it is often used as an idiomatic shorthand for "something that is beautiful but unattainable", such as dreams and mirages. A tertiary meaning is "something that seems tangible and simple but has a deeper ephemeral quality."

This name references 鏡中花，水中月, which is the shorter form of a Chinese idiom (or chéngyǔ), literally meaning a "flower seen in the mirror, moon on the water's surface".

== See also ==
- Flowers of the Four Seasons
- Four Gentlemen
- Four Treasures of the Study
- Smoke and mirrors
- Three Friends of Winter
- Sosuke Aizen, a major antagonist from the manga Bleach, whose blade is called such.
