= Three men make a tiger =

Chinese proverb about communal reinforcement by repetition of an unfounded premise

"Three men make a tiger" (Chinese: 三人成虎; pinyin: sān rén chéng hǔ) is a Chinese proverb or chengyu (four-character idiom). "Three men make a tiger" refers to an individual's tendency to accept absurd information as long as it is repeated by enough people. It refers to the idea that if an unfounded premise or urban legend is mentioned and repeated by many individuals, the premise will be erroneously accepted as the truth. This concept is related to communal reinforcement or the fallacy of argumentum ad populum and argumentum ad nauseam.

== Origin ==
The proverb came from the story of an alleged speech by Pang Cong (龐蔥), an official of the state of Wei in the Warring States period (475 BC – 221 BC) in Chinese history. According to the Warring States Records, or Zhan Guo Ce, before he left on a trip to the state of Zhao, Pang Cong asked the King of Wei whether he would hypothetically believe in one civilian's report that a tiger was roaming the markets in the capital city, to which the King replied no. Pang Cong asked what the King thought if two people reported the same thing, and the King said he would begin to wonder. Pang Cong then asked, "what if three people all claimed to have seen a tiger?" The King replied that he would believe in it. Pang Cong reminded the King that the notion of a live tiger in a crowded market was absurd, yet when repeated by numerous people, it seemed real.

Since Pang Cong, as a high-ranking official, had more than three opponents and critics, he was in fact urging the King to pay no attention to those who would spread rumors about him (Pang Cong) while he was away. "I understand", the King replied, and Pang Cong left for Zhao. Yet, slanderous talk took place. When Pang Cong returned to Wei, the King indeed stopped seeing him.

== Cognitive biases ==
The tendency to accept absurd information is caused by certain cognitive biases. The first of which is the motivated reasoning concept, which is an emotion-biased decision-making phenomenon. It is the idea that humans are motivated to believe whatever confirms their opinions. Motivated reasoning can lead to a false social consensus over time. The second concept is social consensus reality, which explains that beliefs with high societal consensus are treated like facts, whereas beliefs with relatively low consensus are more susceptible to persuasion and attitude change. The latter is most likely a product of the social consensus of the specific community one lives in.

== Examples from economics ==
One application of the cognitive biases highlighted through the anecdote is that markets are efficient. Often investors jump on a wagon that is either directed in buying or shorting a certain stock or index with the main motivation that many other investors are behaving in a unilateral way. In the short-term when many investors buy a certain stock the market experiences a self-fulfilling prophecy and the stock actually gains value although the company might be underperforming and just benefiting from current market trends. Investors who take such decisions are not basing their justification on fundamental analysis or certain limited information but mainly follow an investment trend that is demonstrated by a high number of other investors.

== See also ==
- Argumentum ad populum – Fallacy of claiming the majority is always correct
- Cognitive bias – Systematic pattern of deviation from norm or rationality in judgment
- Truthiness – Belief in truth based on only intuition
- Asch conformity experiments – Series of psychology studies
- The Hunting of the Snark – 1876 nonsense poem by Lewis Carroll – The Bellman's rule-of-three
- The Emperor's New Clothes – 1837 fairy tale by Hans Christian Andersen
- Fake news – False or misleading information presented as real
