= Learning the walk of Handan =

Chinese proverb

Learning the walk of Handan (Chinese: 邯郸学步; pinyin: Hándān xué bù) is a Chinese proverb and idiom which refers to the loss of someone's original abilities through a blind imitation of others. It originates from a story in the ancient Daoist text Zhuangzi, where a young man from the state of Yan travels to the city of Handan to learn the locals' elegant way of walking. However, it results in him forgetting how to walk, and hence, returning home crawling on all fours.

In the contemporary era, the idiom has been used in Chinese political propaganda, notably by General Secretary Xi Jinping and former General Secretary Deng Xiaoping. It is used to warn against the blind adoption of foreign models of development. A stone bridge in Handan, which is the Xuebu Bridge, commemorates the proverb and serves as a local cultural landmark.

== Etymology and origin ==
The story first appears in Zhuangzi. It is attributed to the ancient Chinese philosopher Zhuang Zhou. In the story, it is used as an allegory within a larger discussion about the dangers of abandoning someone's natural way of being.

且子獨不聞夫壽陵餘子之學行於邯鄲與？
未得國能，又失其故行矣，直匍匐而歸耳。
今子不去，將忘子之故，失子之業。

— Zhuang Zhou (3rd Century BCE)
Translation:

And have you not heard of the young learners of Shou-ling, and how they did in Han-dan?
Before they had acquired what they might have done in that capital, they had forgotten what they had learned to do in their old city, and were marched back to it on their hands and knees.
If now you do not go away, you will forget your old acquirements, and fail in your profession.

— The Writings of Chuang Tzu (in Literary Chinese and English). Translated by James Legge. 1891 – via the Chinese Text Project.

Within its Daoist context, the story has been interpreted as a critique of artificiality and the abandonment of one's natural way of being, in pursuit of externally admired forms. The young man's failure is a consequence of rejecting his ziran, which is a central Daoist concept. Daoist philosophy often emphasizes simplicity, authenticity, and living in accordance with the Dao, which is seen as the natural order of the universe. Artificial striving, when it involves rejecting one's own qualities for the sake of external appearances or societal approval, is viewed as a deviation from this natural way and may lead to a loss of fundamental abilities within the Dao.

== Political and ideological usage ==
=== The Warring States period ===
The Zhuangzi was composed during the Warring States period in ancient China. This period saw the rise of the Hundred Schools of Thought, including Confucianism, Daoism, Legalism, and Mohism. Philosophers used parables and allegories to critique social norms or warn against imitating foreign customs.

=== In contemporary Chinese socialism ===
In the contemporary era of Chinese socialism, this idiom has been used both by General Secretaries Deng Xiaoping and Xi Jinping. The story has been used to caution against a blind adoption of foreign models of development, with a particular emphasis on Western political systems. In a 2013 address, Xi Jinping cited the idiom to argue that China should "walk its own road" and avoid both Sovietisation and Westernisation, which reflects the leadership's emphasis on a unique Chinese path to development. State media and party publications have invoked the expression when promoting the concept of "cultural confidence" and warning against "overly admiring foreign things".

== Commemoration ==
A bridge in Handan, referred to as Xuebu Bridge, means "Learning to Walk Bridge" in English. It commemorates the fable and serves as a local cultural landmark. The exact date of the original construction of the bridge is uncertain to this day, and the bridge was rebuilt into the current stone arch bridge during the Ming dynasty in 1617.

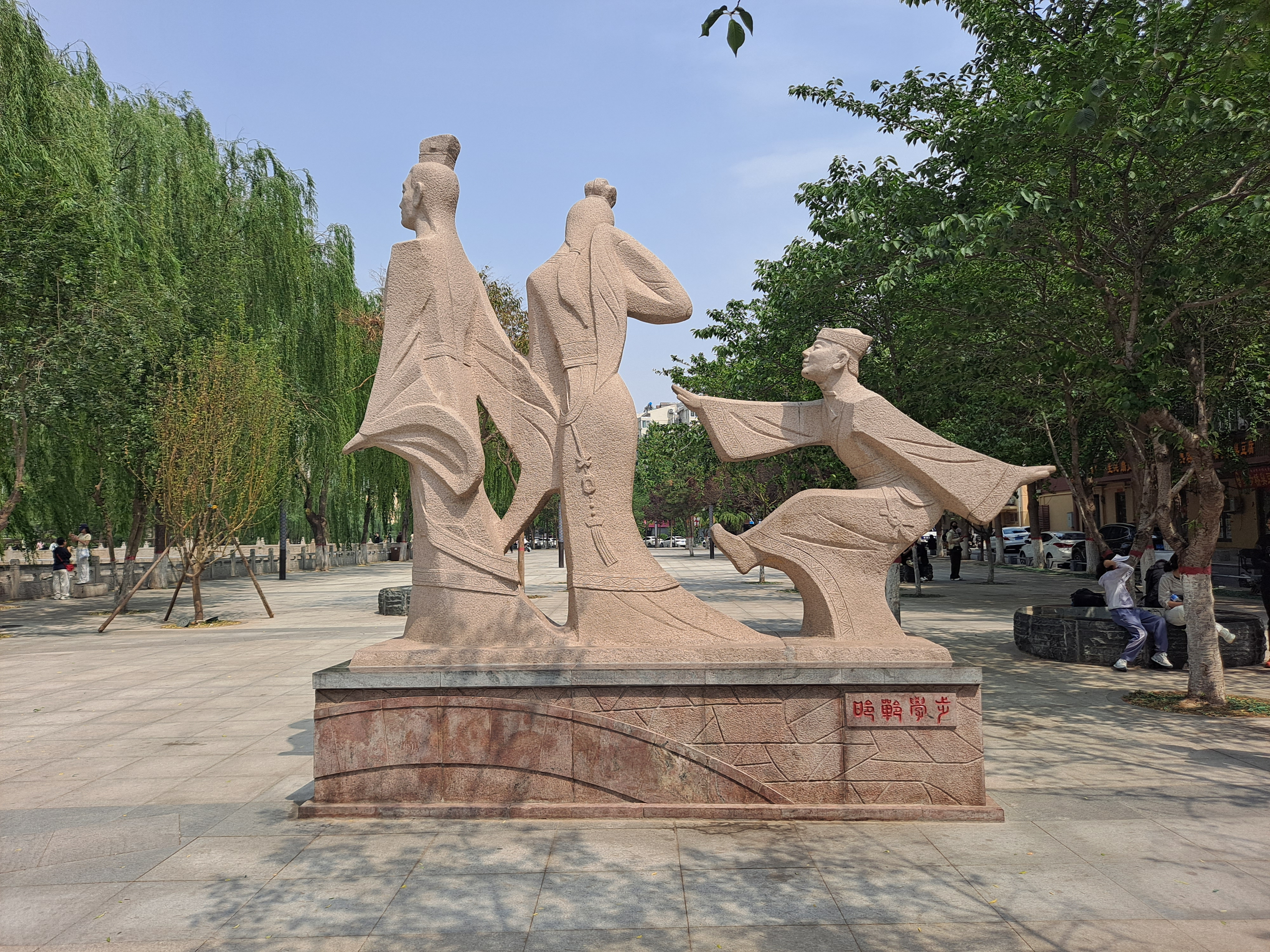
Sculpture in Handan depicting the fable

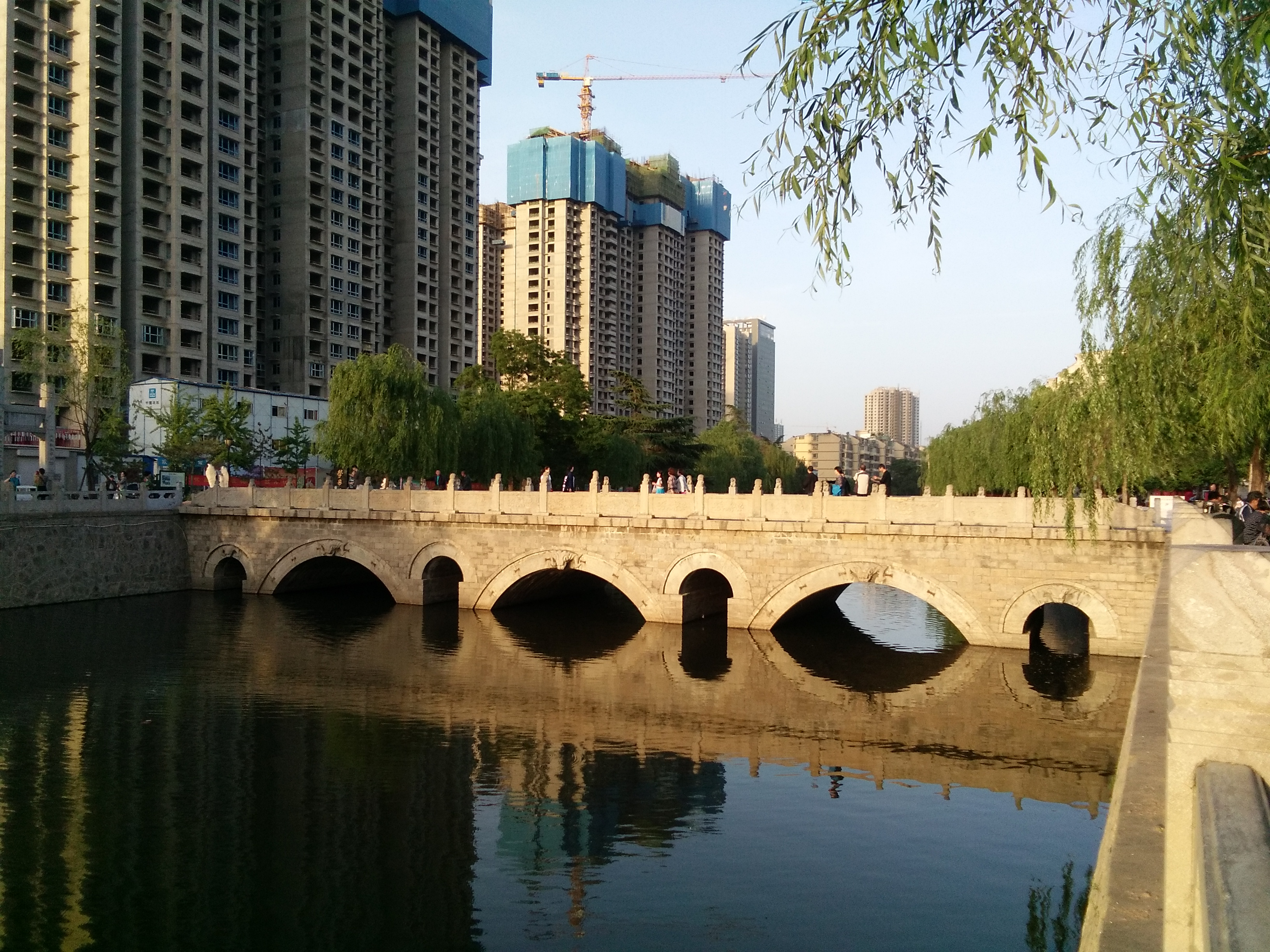
Xue Bu bridge where the story is said to have taken place

== See also ==
- Zhuangzi
- Zhuang Zhou
- Chinese idioms
- Socialism with Chinese characteristics
- Cultural relativism
