= Yi ru fan zhang =

Yi ru fan zhang (易如反掌 yì rú fǎn zhǎng) is a Chinese four-character idiom (chengyu) meaning "very easy". Literally, it means "as easy as turning over one's hand".

The idiom developed as a paraphrase of two passages in Mencius and was an established four-character idiom by the Qing dynasty at the latest.

It has been compared to the English colloquial idiom, as easy as pie.
