= Huzhou ink brush =

Chinese ink brush

Huzhou ink brush or Hubi (simplified Chinese: 湖笔; traditional Chinese: 湖筆; pinyin: Húbǐ; "Hú" stands for Huzhou, "Bǐ" meaning "ink brush") is a kind of Chinese ink brush.

== Name ==
The ink brushes are produced in Huzhou (湖州) of Zhejiang Province, China. Historically, the workshops of ink brushes were congregated in Wuxin (Traditional Chinese: 吳興; Simplified Chinese: 吴兴; Pinyin: Wú Xìng), currently Wuxing District of Huzhou. So it's also named Wuxing Hubi (Traditional Chinese: 吳興湖筆; Simplified Chinese: 吴兴湖笔; Pinyin: Wúxìng Húbǐ).

== History ==
Huzhou has a long history of manufacturing ink brushes, and it can be traced back to Qin dynasty. Huzhou's ink brush production and manufacture gained prominence in the Ming dynasty (13th century). Now Huzhou is known as the "Hometown of Ink Brush".

Huzhou also holds annual "Huzhou Ink Brush Festival", and the festival also has some memorial activities dedicated to Meng Tian - the inventor of ink brush pen.

== Famous ink brush makers ==
There are several famous craftsmen in history from Huzhou, the early big five were:

- Tang Jianchi (traditional Chinese: 湯建馳; simplified Chinese: 汤建驰; pinyin: Tāng Jiànchí)
- Yao Zhenxing (traditional Chinese: 姚新興; simplified Chinese: 姚新兴; pinyin: Yáo Xīnxìng)
- Zhong Weijin (traditional Chinese: 鈡偉今; simplified Chinese: 钟伟今; pinyin: Zhōng Wěijīn)
- Chen Yunqin (traditional Chinese: 陳雲琴; simplified Chinese: 陈云琴; pinyin: Chén Yúnqín)
- Fei Sanduo (traditional Chinese: 費三多; simplified Chinese: 费三多; pinyin: Fèi Sānduō)

== Workshop ==
The most famous brush pen workshop in Huzhou could be the Shanlian (Traditional Chinese: 善璉; Simplified Chinese: 善琏; Pinyin: Shàn Liǎn), and its brush pens are named Shanlian Hubi (Traditional Chinese: 善璉湖筆; Simplified Chinese: 善琏湖笔; Pinyin: Shànliǎn Húbǐ).

Shanlian is also a local place name, whose ancient name was Mengxi (蒙溪, literally means "the creek of Meng Tian"). Meng Tian made brush pens there.

== See also ==
- Daiyuexuan writing brush: another famous kind of brush.
- Four Treasures of the Study
- Huzhou
- Ink brush
- Meng Tian
- Xuan writing brush: another famous brush
