= Xuan writing brush =

Xuan writing brush or Xuanbi (simplified Chinese: 宣笔; traditional Chinese: 宣筆; pinyin: Xuān Bǐ), is a type of ink brush made in Anhui Province, China. Xuan brushes are often used and mentioned together with Xuan paper, a kind of writing rice-paper.

== History ==
The ink brushes are normally made in Jingxian County (currently Jing County) of Anhui Province. In ancient times, Jingxian County was under the jurisdiction of Xuanzhou Prefecture (宣州府; Xuān-Zhōu Fǔ; currently Xuancheng), so its name bears the character Xuan (Xuān).

The Xuan brushes gained popularity during the Jin dynasty (256–420) among classic scholars, governmental officials, calligraphists, and painters.

During the Tang dynasty (618–907) and later Song dynasty (960–1279), Xuanzhou Prefecture became a production and manufacture center for ink brush pens in China, together with Huzhou in Zhejiang province. During and after Tang dynasty, Xuan writing brushes had been continuously listed as a local tribute to the Chinese emperors and their royal courts.

== The brush ==
The most famous Xuan ink brushes are elaborately made of brownish rabbit hair. Xuan brushes are among the most expensive brushes and one of the four most famous brush types in China.

== See also ==
- Daiyuexuan writing brush: another famous kind of brush.
- Four Treasures of the Study
- Huzhou ink brush: another famous kind of brush.
- Ink brush
- Xuan paper
