= When two tigers fight =

Chinese proverb

- Traditional Chinese: 兩虎相爭
- Simplified Chinese: 两虎相争
Transcriptions
Standard Mandarin
- Hanyu Pinyin: Liǎng hǔ xiāng zhēng
Yue: Cantonese
- Yale Romanization: Léuhng fú sēung jāng
- Jyutping: Loeng5 fu2 soeng1 zang1

"When two tigers fight" is a Chinese proverb or chengyu (four-character idiom). It refers to the inevitability that when rivals clash (a recurring theme in traditional Chinese historiography), even though they are great figures, one of them must fall.
