= Chengyu =

Chinese idioms

- Chinese characters for chengyu
- Traditional Chinese: 成語
- Simplified Chinese: 成语
Transcriptions
Standard Mandarin
- Hanyu Pinyin: chéngyǔ
- Bopomofo: ㄔㄥˊ ㄩˇ
- Wade–Giles: ch‘êng^{2}-yü^{3}
- IPA: [ʈʂʰə̌ŋ.ỳ]
Wu
- Romanization: ^{6}zen-gniu
Hakka
- Pha̍k-fa-sṳ: sàng-ngî
Yue: Cantonese
- Yale Romanization: sìhng'yúh
- Jyutping: sing4 jyu5
- IPA: [sɪŋ˩.jy˩˧]
Southern Min
- Hokkien POJ: sêng-gú
- Teochew Peng'im: sêng^{5} ghe^{2}

Chengyu (traditional Chinese: 成語; simplified Chinese: 成语; pinyin: chéngyǔ; trans. "set phrase") are a type of traditional Chinese idiomatic expressions, most of which consist of four Chinese characters. Chengyu were widely used in Literary Chinese and are still common in written vernacular Chinese writing and in the spoken language today. According to the most stringent definition, there are about 5,000 chengyu in the Chinese language, though some dictionaries list over 20,000. Chengyu are considered the collected wisdom of the Chinese culture, and contain the experiences, moral concepts, and admonishments from previous generations of Chinese speakers. Chengyu still play an important role in Chinese conversation and education. Chengyu are one of four types of formulaic expressions (熟语; 熟語; shúyǔ), which also include collocations (惯用语; 慣用語; guànyòngyǔ), two-part allegorical sayings called xiehouyu, and proverbs (谚语; 諺語; yànyǔ).

While not the only idioms in Chinese, and not always four characters long, they are often referred to as Chinese idioms or four-character idioms.

== Origins, construction, and interpretation ==
Chengyu are mostly derived from ancient literature, including the pre-Qin classics, poetry from all periods of Chinese history, and late imperial vernacular novels and short stories. A small number were constructed in the 19th and early 20th centuries from Western source materials. Among the early classical literature, the lyrical imagery from the Classic of Poetry, and the detailed stories recorded in the Zuo Zhuan and the Records of the Grand Historian serve as particularly rich source materials for chengyu. Since the Classic of Poetry poems consist of four-character lines, some chengyu are direct quotes from the collection. For example, 萬夀無疆 'ten-thousand year lifespan without bound', a traditional expression to wish someone a long life that often appears on bowls and tableware, quotes the poem "Tian Bao" (天保, poem #166) in the Lesser Court Hymns section of the Classic of Poetry. More commonly, however, chengyu are created by succinctly paraphrasing or summarizing the original text, usually by selecting the most salient characters from the passage in question and inserting any necessary classical grammatical particles.

As such, chengyu are fossilized expressions that use the vocabulary and follow the syntactic rules of Literary Chinese. Consequently, they convey information more compactly than normal vernacular speech or writing. They may contain subject and predicate and act as an independent clause (or even twin two-character independent clauses in parallel), or they may play the role of any part of speech in a sentence, acting syntactically as an adjective, adverb, verb, or noun phrase. In both speech and writing, they serve to succinctly convey a complex or multifaceted situation, scene, or concept, and used fittingly and elegantly, they also mark a speaker or writer's erudition.

The meaning of a chengyu usually surpasses the sum of the meanings carried by the four characters, as chengyu are generally meant to convey the message or moral of the myth, story or historical event from which they were derived. Thus, even after translation into modern words and syntax, chengyu in isolation are often unintelligible without additional explanation. Since they often contain a classical allusion, known as a diǎngù (典故), elementary and secondary school students in greater China learn chengyu as part of the classical curriculum in order to study the context from which the chengyu was born.

Often the four characters reflect the moral behind the story rather than the story itself. For example, the phrase "破釜沉舟" (pò fǔ chén zhōu, lit: "break the pots and sink the ships") is based on a historical account where the general Xiang Yu ordered his troops to destroy all cooking utensils and boats after crossing a river into the enemy's territory. He won the battle because of this "no-retreat" strategy. Thus, the idiom is used as a verb phrase with the meaning "to make an all-out effort to achieve success by the deliberate removal of recourse or backup." Similar phrases are known in the West, such as "Burning one's boats", "burning one's bridges", "Point of no return" or "Crossing the Rubicon".

Another example is 瓜田李下 (guātián lǐxià 'melon field, beneath the plums'), whose meaning relates to the appearance of misconduct or impropriety. It is derived from an excerpt of a Han-era poem (樂府詩《君子行》, Yuèfǔ Shī "Jūnzǐ Xíng"). The poem includes the lines 'don't adjust your shoes in a melon field, and don't tidy your hat under the plum trees' (瓜田不納履，李下不整冠, guā tián bù nà lǚ, lǐ xià bù zhěng guān), admonishing the reader to avoid situations where, however innocent, he might be suspected of doing wrong. The idiom is impossible to understand without the background knowledge of the origin of the phrase.

Some idioms have had their literal meanings overtake their original ones. For example, 'wind from an empty cave' (空穴來風, kōng xué lái fēng), despite now being used to describe rumors without source, originally referred to rumors with actual, solid sources or reasons. Likewise, 'bare-faced facing the emperor' (素面朝天) is now used to describe beauty that does not require make-up, e.g., when entering court, while its original meaning was "to be confident in one's true look".

However, not all chengyu have stories to draw morals from. An example is 言而無信 'speaking, yet without trust', referring to one who cannot be trusted despite what he says, an essentially deceitful person. It is generally acknowledged as a chengyu as it comes from the Analects. The idiom is succinct in its original meaning and would likely be intelligible to anyone learned in formal written Chinese, though yán (言) is no longer commonly used as a verb.

There are a few chengyu that are not four characters in length. An example is the seven-character 醉翁之意不在酒 'The Old Drunkard's attention is not directed towards his wine'. This is a direct quote from Ouyang Xiu's essay An Account of Old Drunkard's Pavilion (醉翁亭記), in which the author, as the Old Drunkard, expresses his true intention of enjoying the scenery of the mountains and rivers as he drinks. As an idiom, it expresses the situation where one does something with an ulterior though benign motive in mind.

Some chengyu have English equivalents. For example, 言不由衷 'speak not from the bosom' and 'to speak with one's tongue in one's cheek' share idiomatic meanings. The Chinese not having conducted maritime explorations of the North Atlantic during imperial times, the expression 冰山一角 'one corner of an ice mountain' is a rare example of a chengyu that emerged in the early 20th century after contact with the West as a translation of the expression "tip of the iceberg," thus sharing both their literal and idiomatic meanings. Another expression 火中取栗 'extracting chestnuts from the fire', originating from a La Fontaine fable, means "to be duped into taking risks for someone else," used in much the same way as the expression "cat's paw" in English is another example of an "international" chengyu. Though they are recent in origin, they are constructed using the vocabulary and syntax of Literary Chinese and fits within the four-character scheme, making them chengyu.

Chinese idioms can also serve as a guide through Chinese culture. Chengyu teach about motifs that were previously common in Chinese literature and culture. For example, idioms with nature motifs – e.g., mountains, water, and the Moon – are numerous. Works considered masterpieces of Chinese literature – such as the Four Great Classical Novels – serve as the source for many idioms, which in turn condense and retell the story.

All Chinese people know idioms, though the total number known by any one individual will depend on their background. Idioms are such an important part of Chinese popular culture that there is a game called 成語接龍 'connect the chengyu' that involves someone calling out an idiom, with someone else then being supposed to think of another idiom to link up with the first one, so that the last character of the first idiom is the same as the first character of the second idiom, and so forth.

== Translation ==
=== Functional equivalence ===
Eugene Nida's theory of functional equivalence emphasizes that translation should convey the meaning of and intended effect of original text, rather than translation in words by words. This theory emphasizes that translation should not merely aim to match language form between the source and target texts, but should convey the original text's meaning and function through natural, appropriate expressions in the target language.

This theory is particularly valuable for the English translation of Chinese idioms. The meaning of idioms goes far beyond their literal composition. They may contain metaphorical meanings, historical anecdotes, and specific cultural associations. Therefore, even if a word-for-word translation retains the original imagery of the idiom, it may not enable English readers without a cultural background to understand its true meaning. From the perspective of functional equivalence, the translator needs to make a choice between preserving the original imagery, explaining the cultural background, and using expressions with similar meanings in English, in order to convey the core meaning and communicative function of the idiom as accurately as possible. For example, when looking at the translation of film and TV works, viewers might see an idiom being translated into a single sentence, or even several words.

=== Three methods of translating ===
Since idioms carry specific implicit meanings, emotional connotations and communicative functions, readers from different cultural backgrounds may not fully understand the meanings. Therefore, translators will adopt different strategies based on the language and cultural background of the target readers when conveying the original meaning.use different strategies to communicate their intended meanings to readers.

- Literal translation: Literal translation can be used if readers can understand the image in the idioms. Literal translation can convey their meanings while retaining the cultural characteristics of the original text. For instance, "不入虎穴，焉得虎子" means if you do not enter the tiger’s lair, how can you get the tiger cub? Here it also has a metaphorical meaning: if you want to obtain anything, one needs to take risks.
- Literal translation with explanation: If the readers do not understand the true meaning after the literal translation, add explanations to help readers to understand the meaning. For instance, the literal translation of "三个臭皮匠，顶个诸葛亮" is "Three cobblers combined equal to Zhuge Liang." This translation would confuse readers who do not know Chinese history. Zhuge Liang was the prime minister of the Shu Han Kingdom during the Three Kingdoms period and is regarded as one of the most intelligent person in Chinese history. Based on the background of Chinese history, the translation is: "Three cobblers, when their intelligence is combined, would be equivalent to Zhuge Liang, the mastermind."
- Equivalent or corresponding idiom: When an English idiom has a similar meaning to a Chinese idiom, the English idiom can be direct used in translation, instead of translating the Chinese idiom word by word. In this way, it is more easier for readers to understand the meaning and make the translation more natural and smoothly. For instance, the literal meaning of 火上浇油 is “add fuel to the flame,” which also exists in English.

== Chinese examples ==
The following three examples show that the meaning of the idiom can be totally different by only changing one character.

- 一(yí) 日(rì) 千(qiān) 秋(qiū) : "One day, a thousand autumns."
  - Meaning: implies rapid changes; one day equals a thousand years
- 一(yí) 日(rì) 千(qiān) 里(lǐ) : "One day, a thousand miles."
  - Meaning: implies rapid progress; traveling a thousand miles in a day
- 一(yí) 日(rì) 三(sān) 秋(qiū) : "One day, three autumns."
  - Meaning: greatly missing someone; one day feels as long as three years

Examples in Chinese
Chengyu	Gloss	Meaning	Etymology
一箭雙鵰(yí jiàn shuāng diāo)	kill two eagles with one arrow	kill two birds with one stone, i.e. to achieve two aims at once	See History of the Northern Dynasties
破釜沉舟(pò fǔ chén zhōu)	break the cauldrons and sink the boats	burn bridges, i.e. commit oneself irrevocably	See Battle of Julu
指鹿為馬(zhǐ lù wéi mǎ)	call a deer a horse	deliberately misrepresent	See Zhao Gao
樂不思蜀(lè bù sī shǔ)	so happy as to forget Shu	indulge in pleasures	See Liu Shan
朝三暮四(zhāo sān mù sì)	to say three in the morning and four in the evening	always changing (new meaning), a change without any substantive difference (original meaning)	See Zhuangzi
井底之蛙(jǐng dǐ zhī wā)	a frog in the bottom of the well	a person with limited outlook	See Zhuangzi
磨杵成針(mó chǔ chéng zhēn)	grind an iron bar down to a fine needle	to persevere in a difficult task	See Li Bai
守株待兔(shǒu zhū dài tù)	guard a tree-stump to wait for rabbits	wait idly for a reward	See Han Feizi
亡羊補牢(wáng yáng bǔ láo)	to mend the pen after sheep are lost	close the stable door after the horse has bolted, i.e. try too late to prevent harm	See Warring States Records
三人成虎(sān rén chéng hǔ)	Three men make a tiger	repeated rumor becomes a fact	See Warring States Records
完璧歸趙(wán bì guī zhào)	return the jade to Zhao	to return something intact to its rightful owner	See Mr. He's jade
塞翁失馬(sài wēng shī mǎ)	old man from the frontier lost his horse	a blessing in disguise	See Huainanzi
刻舟求劍(kè zhōu qiú jiàn)	carve the boat in search of the sword	approach without considering the reality of a situation	See Lüshi Chunqiu
火中取栗(huǒ zhōng qǔ lì)	take chestnuts out of the fire	Someone acting in another's interest (cat's-paw)	Derived from The Monkey and the Cat
負荊請罪(fù jīng qǐng zuì)	carrying a bramble and ask for punishment	offer a humble apology	See Lian Po
紙上談兵(zhǐ shàng tán bīng)	talk about military tactics on paper	theoretical discussion useless in practice	See Zhao Kuo
畫蛇添足(huà shé tiān zú)	to add feet when drawing a snake	to improve something unnecessarily	See Warring States Records
畫龍點睛(huà lóng diǎn jīng)	to add eyes when painting a dragon	adding the finishing touch to something	See Zhang Sengyou
對牛彈琴(duì niú tán qín)	playing the guqin to a cow	to communicate well, you need to understand your audience	See Mouzi Lihuolun
狼吞虎嚥(láng tūn hǔ yàn)	swallow like a tiger and devour like a wolf	devouring food quickly and in a messy manner	
衣錦還鄉(yì jǐn huán xiāng)	to wear embroidered clothing and return to one's hometown	return to humble origins after making it big	
有備無患(yǒu bèi wú huàn)	to be prepared against adverse events	just in case	
易如反掌(yì rú fǎn zhǎng)	as easy as turning over one's hand	for something to be very easy	See Mencius
邯郸学步(Hán dān xué bù)	to learn the walk of Handan	to imitate others, and lose one's own abilities in the process	See Learning the Walk of Handan

Multiple chengyu are sometimes used together in set expressions for ceremonial or festive greetings. For example, numbered New Year greetings beginning with the characters for one through ten are commonly used during the Chinese New Year to express wishes for success, health, and happiness.

Common Positive Chengyu Beginning with Numbers 1–10
Number	Chengyu	Meaning
1 : (一(yī))	一帆风顺(yī fān fēng shùn)	Ship with a single sail, sailing smoothly; success without obstacles
2 : (二(èr))	二龙腾飞(èr lóng téng fēi)	Two dragons soaring; aspirations for soaring success and progress
3 : (三(sān))	三阳开泰(sān yáng kāi tài)	The arrival of good fortune; metaphor for winter's end
4 : (四(sì))	四季平安(sì jì píng ān)	Peace and safety throughout the four seasons (a year)
5 : (五(wǔ))	五福临门(wǔ fú lín mén)	The five blessings arrive: health, longevity, prosperity, virtue, and peace
6 : (六(liù))	六六大顺(liù liù dà shùn)	Everything goes smoothly; the number 六(liù) is a near homophone of 流(liú) meaning flowing/smooth without hindrance
7 : (七(qī))	七星高照(qī xīng gāo zhào)	The seven stars shine brightly, invoking the auspiciousness of the Big Dipper Constellation
8 : (八(bā))	八方来财(bā fāng lái cái)	Wealth arrives from all directions; 八方(bā fāng) (lit. eight directions) means all directions, similar to how there are four cardinal and four intercardinal directions
9 : (九(jiǔ))	九九同心(jiǔ jiǔ tóng xīn)	United in heart forever; 九(jiǔ) (nine) is a homophone of 久(jiǔ) (long-lasting, enduring); hence, conveying a sense of eternity and longevity
10 : (十(shí))	十全十美(shí quán shí měi)	Perfect in every way; the number 10 in Chinese can have connotations of fullness and completeness

- Crouching Tiger, Hidden Dragon
- Seek truth from facts
- When two tigers fight
- Mirror Flower, Water Moon

== Japanese examples ==
Yojijukugo is the similar format in Japanese. The term yojijukugo (四字熟語; four character idiom) is autological. Many of these idioms were adopted from their Chinese counterparts and have the same or similar meaning as in Chinese. The term koji seigo (故事成語; historical idiom) refers to an idiom that comes from a specific text as the source. As such, the overwhelming majority of koji seigo comes from accounts of history written in classical Chinese. Although many of the Japanese four-character idioms are derived from Chinese, many others are purely Japanese in origin. Some examples:

- 花鳥風月 ka, chō, fū, getsu ("Flower, Bird, Wind, Moon"; beauties of nature)
- 一期一会 ichigo ichie (once-in-a-lifetime experience)
- 傍目八目 okamehachimoku (a bystander's vantage point)
- 手前味噌 temaemiso (singing one's own praises; tooting one's own horn)
- 二股膏薬 futamatagōyaku (double-dealer; time-server)
- 風林火山 fū, rin, ka, zan ("wind, woods, fire, mountain"; military proverb coming from Sun Tzu's "Art of War"; see also Fūrinkazan)

== Korean examples ==
The Korean equivalent are sajaseongeo (Korean: 사자성어; Hanja: 四字成語). They have similar categorization to Japanese ones, such as gosaseongeo (고사성어; 故事成語) for historical idioms. Although many sajaseongeo are derived from Chinese ones, Korean people also created their own unique idioms that reflect Korean culture, referred to as Hanguk-san sajaseongeo (Korean: 한국산 사자성어; Hanja: 韓國產四字成語).

== Vietnamese examples ==
Four word idioms or any idiom in Vietnamese are known as thành ngữ (chữ Hán: 成語, literally "set phrase/speech"). A large amount of idioms originating from Classical Chinese have been borrowed into the language, but there exists native counterparts to the Classical Chinese idioms. There are also many idioms that are Vietnamese in origin. Vietnamese idioms can be classified into Sino-Vietnamese idioms (Vietnamese: thành ngữ Hán Việt, chữ Hán Nôm: 成語漢越) and native Vietnamese idioms (Vietnamese: thành ngữ thuần Việt, chữ Hán Nôm: 成語純越) that were once written in chữ Nôm, are now written in the Latin-based Vietnamese alphabet.

Sino-Vietnamese Idioms
Classical Chinese (Hán văn, 漢文)	Vietnamese alphabet (chữ Quốc Ngữ, 𡨸國語)	Meaning
否極泰來	Bĩ cực thái lai	The darkest hour is just before the dawn "The worst situation comes before a good one."
相親相愛	Tương thân tương ái	To be altruistic and charitable to each other, especially in times of crisis or disaster
盡善盡美	Tận thiện tận mỹ	Very good or beautiful
溫故知新	Ôn cố tri tân	One should be able to derive new understanding while revising what one has learned.
全心全意	Toàn tâm toàn ý	With all of one's heart; completely dedicated

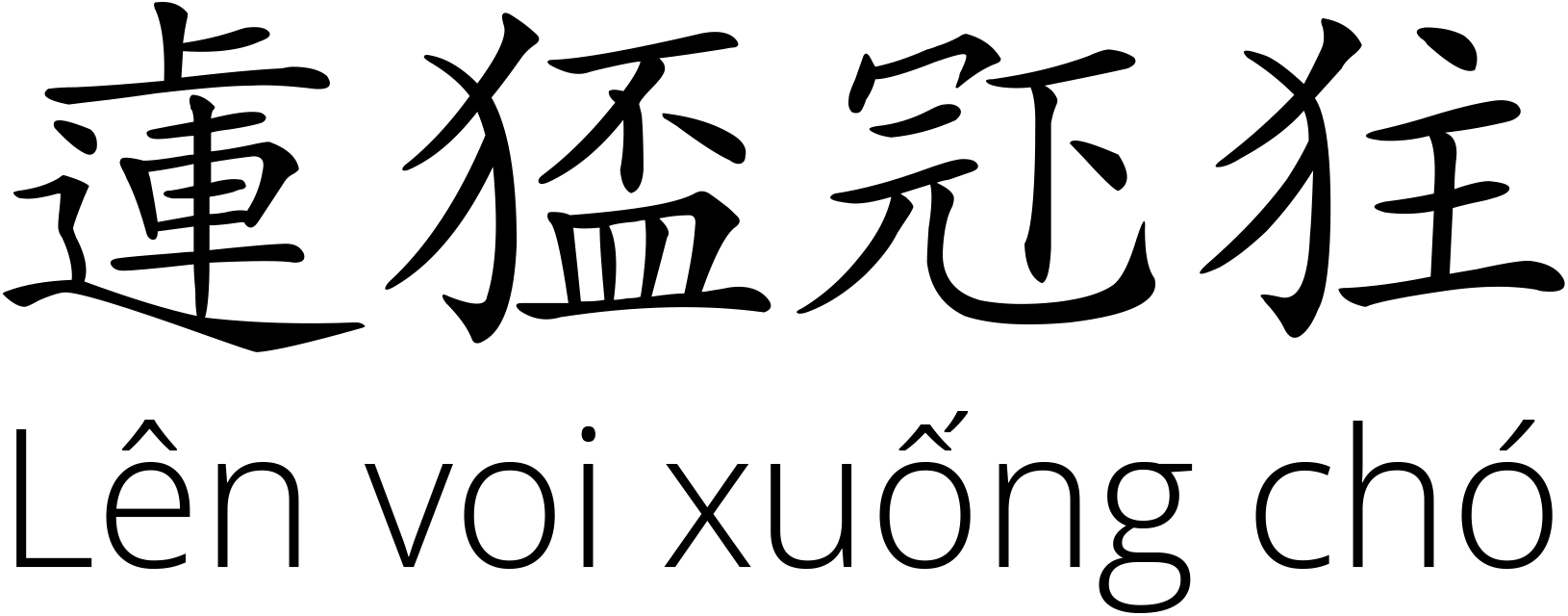

Native Vietnamese Idioms
Chữ Hán Nôm ( 𡨸漢喃)	Vietnamese alphabet (chữ Quốc Ngữ, 𡨸國語)	Meaning
𫗒𠰳𫡽𠰳	Ăn miếng trả miếng	Tit for tat; literally, "eat a piece, pay back a piece"
𢢂𨐮𢢂𧃵	Ghét cay ghét đắng	To have an extreme and utter hatred, literally, "Hate spiciness, hate bitterness"
幔𡗶𥴜𡐙	Màn trời chiếu đất	A situation where many people become homeless, especially after a disaster; literally, "to use the sky as a curtain and the land as a mat"
厭𣵰羅鐄	Im lặng là vàng	Peace and quiet have great value; literally, "Peace and quiet is golden"

== In popular culture ==
The plot of the Taiwanese comedy-drama GG Precinct centres on people murdered for misquoting Chinese idioms.

== See also ==
- Idiom
- Chinese characters
- Xiehouyu, typically longer Chinese proverbs
- Homophonic puns in Mandarin Chinese
- Proverbs commonly said to be Chinese
- Mulberry fields (idiom)

== Dictionaries of Mandarin Chinese Idioms ==
- Herbert Allen Giles (1873). A dictionary of colloquial idioms in the Mandarin dialect. SHANGHAI: A.H. de Carvalho. pp. 65. (Harvard University) (Digitized Jul 22, 2005)
- Herbert Allen Giles (1873). A dictionary of colloquial idioms in the Mandarin dialect. SHANGHAI: A.H. De Carvalho. pp. 65. (Harvard University) (Digitized Mar 4, 2009)
- Jiao, Liwei; Kubler, Cornelius C.; Zhang, Weiguo (2013). 500 Common Chinese Idioms: An Annotated Frequency Dictionary (Kindle ed.). Oxon, UK: Routledge. ISBN 9780415776820.
- Pan, Weigui (2000). A Chinese-English Dictionary of Chinese Idioms. Beijing: Sinolingua. ISBN 9787800522376.
