= Ink brush =

Calligraphic tool

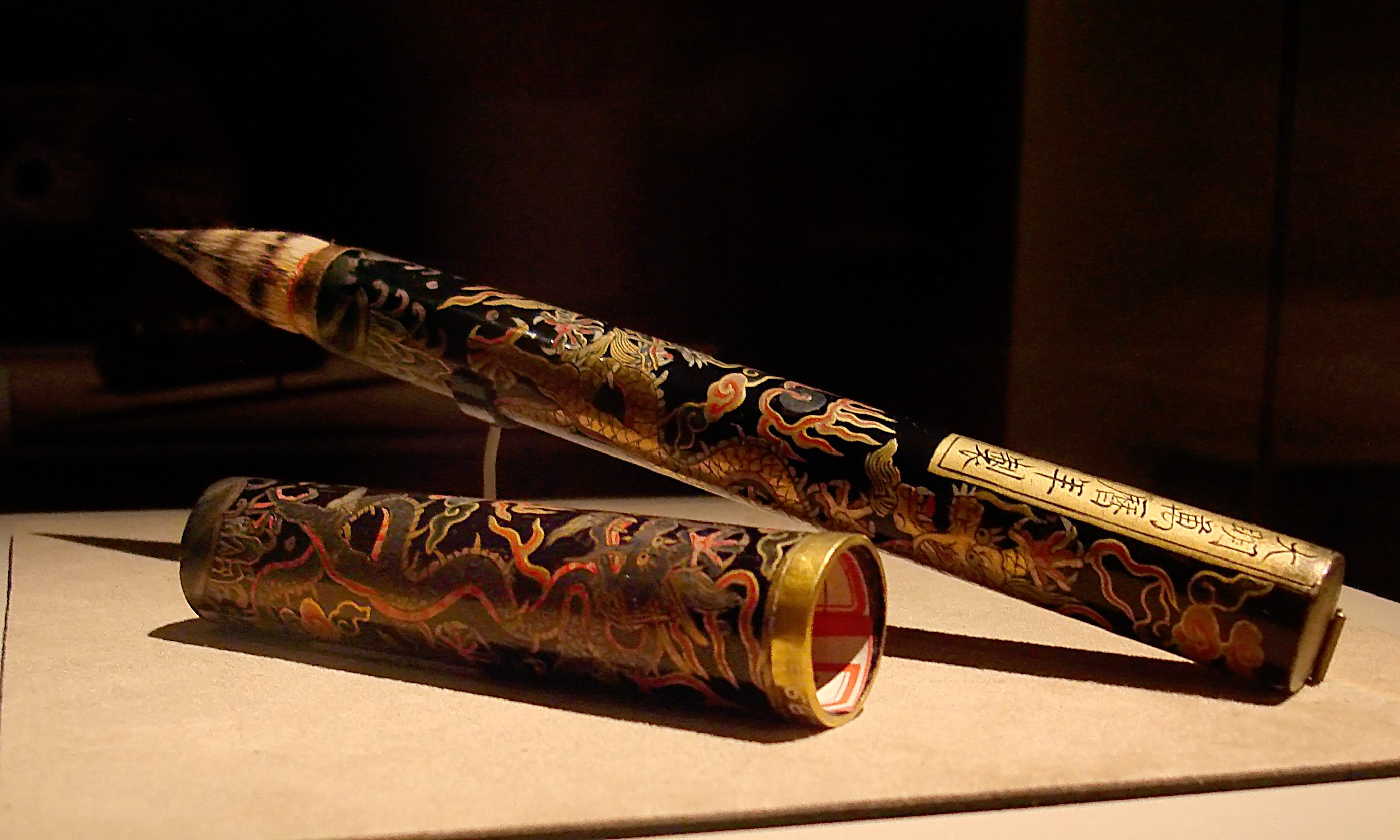
- Ink brush with golden dragon design, used by the Wanli Emperor (1563–1620).

Chinese name
- Traditional Chinese: 毛筆
- Simplified Chinese: 毛笔
- Literal meaning: "hair/fur brush"
Transcriptions
Standard Mandarin
- Hanyu Pinyin: máobǐ
- IPA: [mǎʊ.pì]
Yue: Cantonese
- Yale Romanization: mòuhbāt
- Jyutping: mou4-bat1
- IPA: [mɔw˩.pɐt̚˥]
Southern Min
- Hokkien POJ: mô͘-pit

Vietnamese name
- Vietnamese alphabet: bút lông
- Hán-Nôm: 筆𱻢

Korean name
- Hangul: 붓
- Hanja: 筆
Transcriptions
- Revised Romanization: but

Japanese name
- Kanji: 筆
Transcriptions
- Romanization: fude

A Chinese writing brush (traditional Chinese: 毛筆; simplified Chinese: 毛笔; pinyin: máo bǐ) is a paintbrush used as a writing tool in Chinese calligraphy as well as in Japanese, Korean, and Vietnamese which all have roots in Chinese calligraphy. They are also used in Chinese painting and other brush painting styles. Ink brushes were in use in China by the Warring States period (475–221 BCE), and traces of brush-written characters go back to the Shang dynasty. Together with the inkstone, inkstick and Xuan paper, these four writing implements form the Four Treasures of the Study.

== Types ==
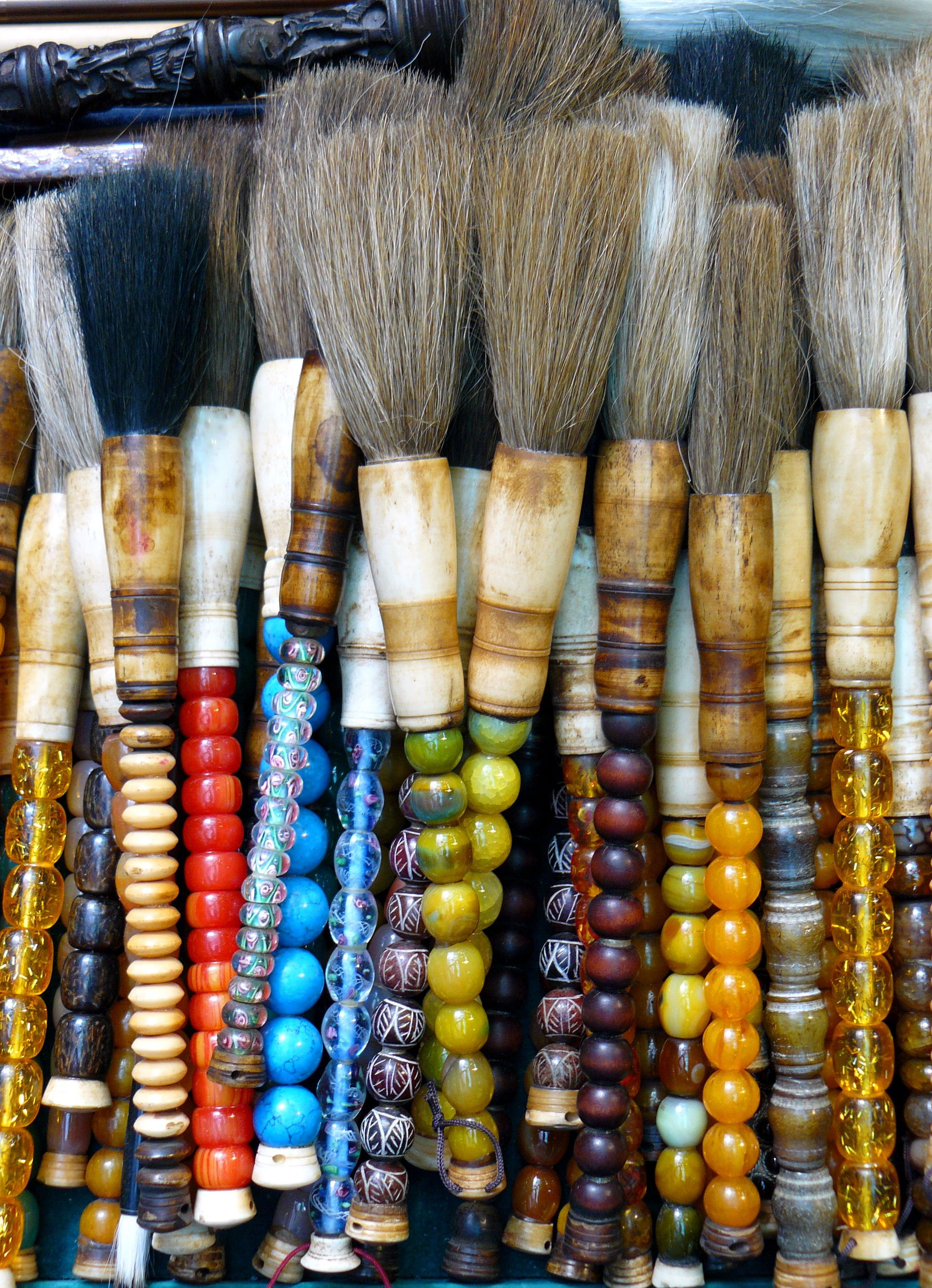
Ink brushes of various size and material for sale

Brushes differ greatly in terms of size, texture, material, and cost. The brush hair chosen depends on one's needs at the moment; certain kinds of brushes are more suited to certain script styles and individuals than others.

- Handle: usually of bamboo, exotic brushes may instead use such materials as gold, silver, jade, ivory, red sandalwood or spotted bamboo.
- Hair source: normally the brush is made from goat, Siberian weasel (Chinese: 黄鼠狼; pinyin: huángshǔláng, yellow-rat-wolf), pig, mouse, buffalo, wolf, or rabbit hair, while exotic ones can be made from tiger, fowl, deer, and even human hair (from a baby's first haircut, said to bring good fortune while taking the imperial examinations).
- Hair texture: soft (Chinese: 軟毫; pinyin: ruǎnháo), mixed (Chinese: 兼毫; pinyin: jiānháo), or hard hair (Chinese: 硬毫; pinyin: yìngháo).
- Hair size: generally classified as either big (Chinese: 大楷; pinyin: dàkǎi, Japanese: 大筆, romanized: ōfude), medium (Chinese: 中楷; pinyin: zhōngkǎi, Japanese: 中筆, romanized: chūfude), or small (Chinese: 小楷; pinyin: xiǎokǎi, Japanese: 小筆, romanized: kofude); most calligraphy is written with a medium-sized brush. The smallest brushes are used for very small pieces and for fashioning designs for seals. While medium size brushes are the most widely used, wielded by a skilled artist a medium brush can produce a variety of thicknesses of line from very thin to fairly thick. The largest brushes are used only for very large pieces.
- Hair length: generally classified by hair length for thickness of handle as either long (Japanese: 長鋒, romanized: chōhō), medium (Japanese: 中鋒, romanized: chūhō), or short (Japanese: 短鋒, romanized: tanhō); most calligraphy is written with a medium-length hair brush. The long hair brush is used because it can hold ink longer than short hair brushes due to its length. It is thus used for continuous long or short stroke line scripting, such as in the Japanese traditional hiragana in the renmen (Japanese: 連綿) style. The hair of long hair brushes tends to be made of hard textured hair to help it keep a point, but this is not a hard and fast rule. Japanese very long and slender hair brushes called menso-burushes (Japanese: 面相筆) are used for detail painting.

Synthetic hair is not traditionally used. Prices vary greatly depending on the quality of the brush; cheap brushes cost less than one US dollar while expensive brushes can cost more than a thousand dollars. Currently, the finest brushes are made in the town of Shanlian, in the Nanxun District, prefecture-level city of Huzhou, of Zhejiang province.

== History ==
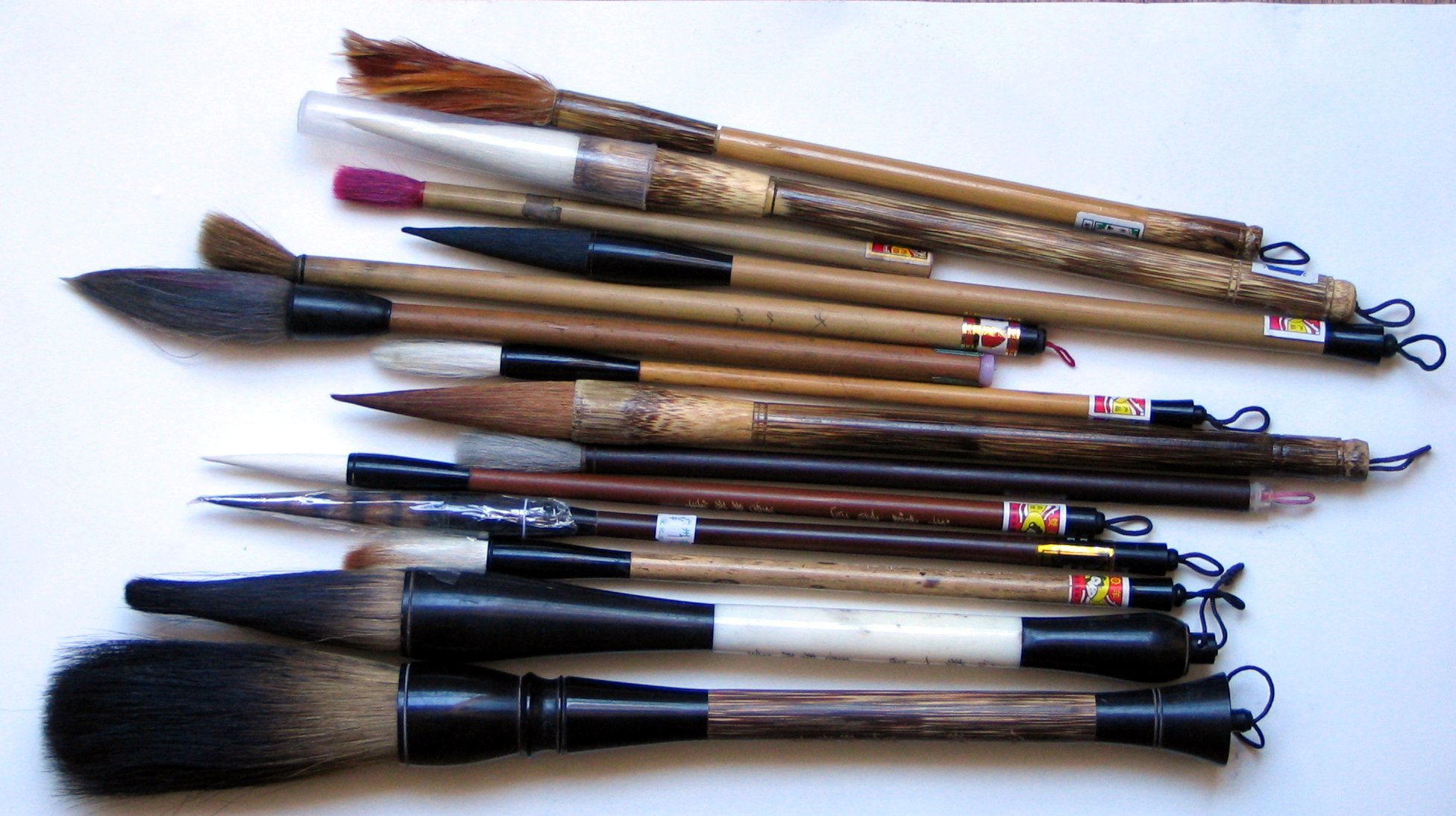
Brushes of various sizes and types of hair, including one of chicken feathers at the top

Two of the earliest known ink brushes were excavated from Warring States period (475–221 BCE) tombs of the state of Chu. The first was found in 1956–1957 in Tomb 1 at Changtaiguan near Xinyang, Henan, which its excavators dated to the early Warring States period. Stored with a set of bronze tools used to prepare bamboo slips, it has a bamboo shaft 23.4 cm long with the hair tied on by cord, and was found with its head still inside a bamboo case. The second was found in 1954 in Tomb 15 at Zuojiagongshan (左家公山) near Changsha; its head of rabbit hair, about 2.5 cm long, was clamped into the split end of a bamboo shaft and bound with silk thread. Legend wrongly credits the invention of the ink brush to the later Qin general Meng Tian.

Traces of the writing brush, however, were discovered on the Shang jades, and were suggested to be the grounds of the oracle bone inscriptions.

The writing brush entered a new stage of development in the Han dynasty. First, it created the decoration craft of engraving and inlaying on the pen-holder. Second, some writings on the production of writing brush appeared. For example, the first monograph on the selection, production and function of writing brush was written by Cai Yong in the eastern Han dynasty. Third, the special form of "hairpin white pen" appeared. Officials in the Han dynasty often sharpened the end of the brush and stuck it in their hair or hat for their convenience. Worshipers also often put pen on their heads to show respect.

To The Yuan and Ming dynasty, Huzhou emerged a group of pen making experts to make it more convenient, such as Wu Yunhui, Feng Yingke, Lu Wenbao, Zhang Tianxi, etc. Huzhou has been the center of Chinese brush making since the Qing dynasty. At the same time, there was many famous brushes in other places, such as Ruyang Liu brush in Henan province, Li Dinghe brush in Shanghai, Wu Yunhui in Jiangxi province.

== Fudepen ==
The fudepen, also known as a "brush pen", is a modern Japanese invention analogous to a fountain pen. Today, Japanese companies such as Pentel and Sakura Color Products Corporation manufacture pens with tips resembling those of a small ink brush. These brush pens work almost identically to small ink brushes and can be used for most of the same purposes.

== See also ==
- Chinese calligraphy
- Huzhou ink brush
- Xuan writing brush
- Japanese calligraphy
- Korean calligraphy
