= Liulichang =

District of Beijing, China

Coordinates: 39°53′42.87″N 116°23′10.92″E

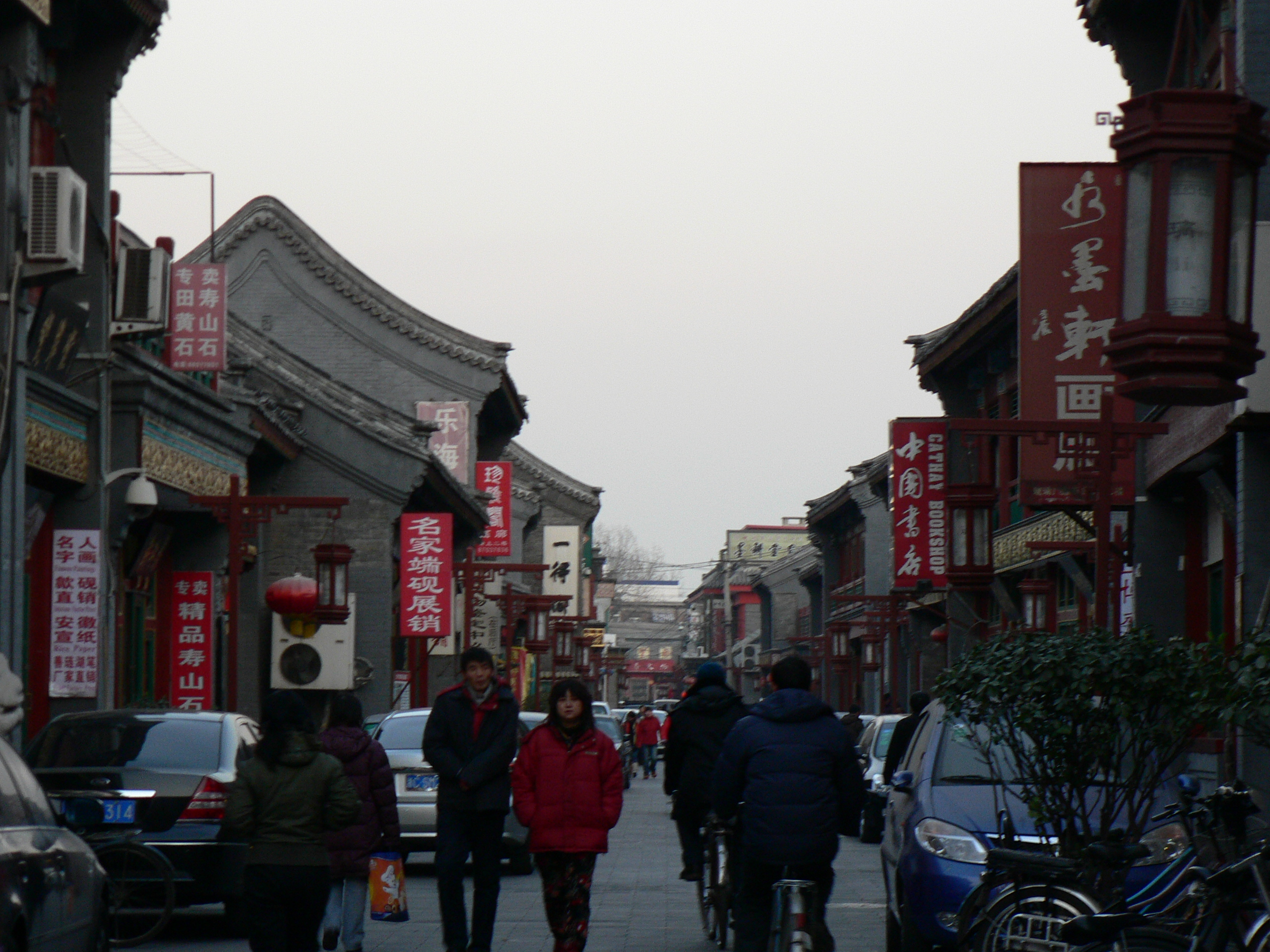
Liulichang

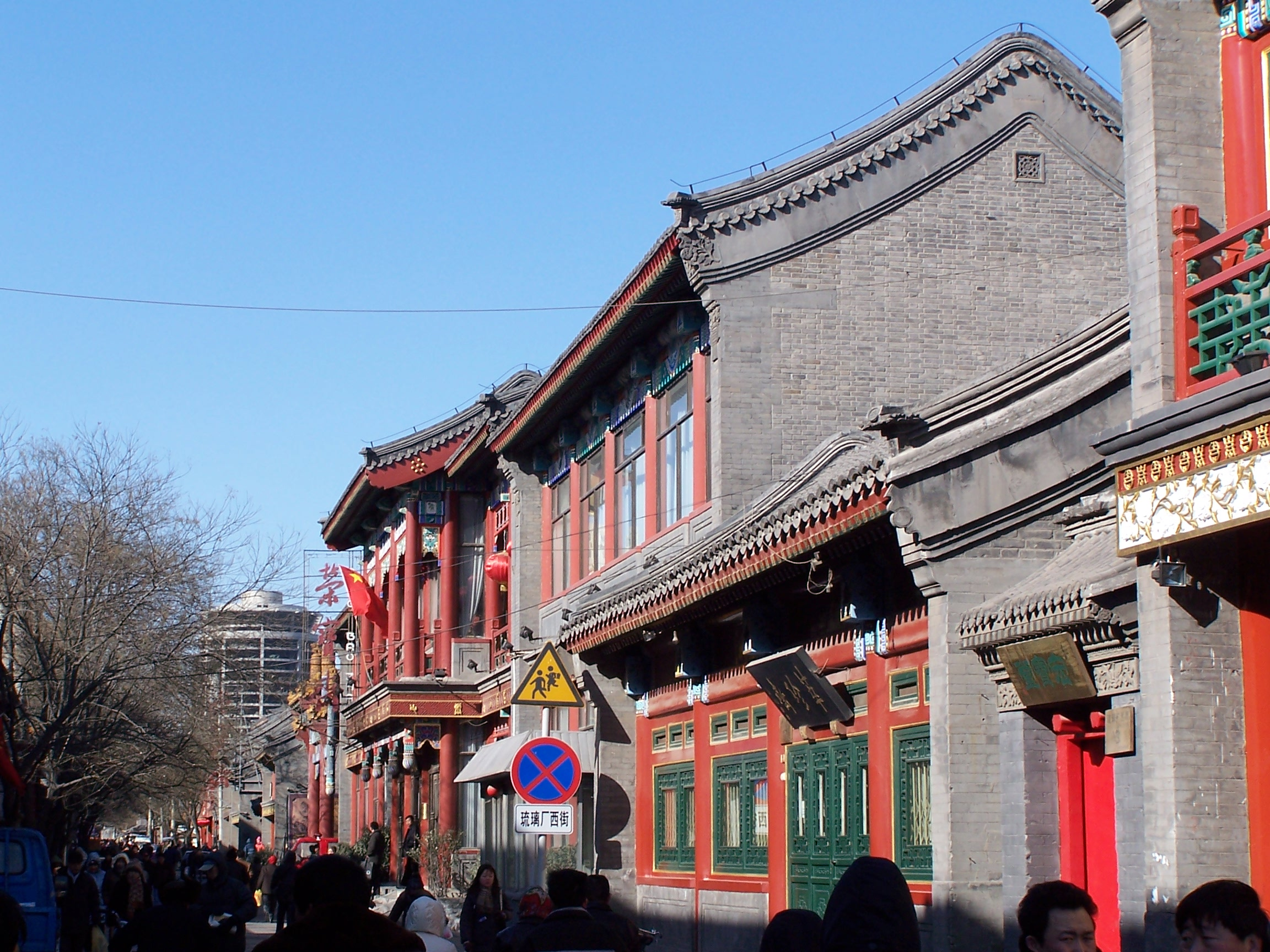

Liulichang (simplified Chinese: 琉璃厂; traditional Chinese: 琉璃廠; pinyin: Liúlíchǎng) is a street in Xicheng District, Beijing that is known for a series of traditional Chinese stone dwellings selling various craftwork, artistry, and antiques. It is one of Beijing's traditional old quarters.

== History ==
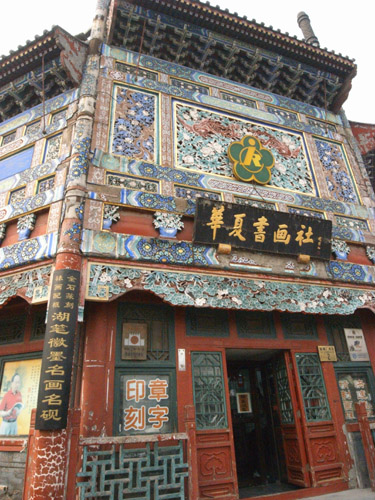
An example of a building at Liulichang

The name Liulichang dates back to the Ming dynasty, when a renowned coloured glaze factory called "Liulichang" was in production on this street, which made glazed tiles for the palaces, temples, and residences of the officials.

According to local tradition, during the Ming and Qing dynasties, Liulichang was a favourite haunt for scholars, painters, and calligraphers who gathered there to write, compile, and purchase books, as well as to paint and compose poetry. By the Kangxi era (1661–1722) of the Qing dynasty, Liulichang had become one of the most flourishing cultural centres in all of Beijing.

== Renovations ==
Large-scale renovations in modern times have transformed Liulichang into an antique market that resembles a Chinese village. Shops located on the street have a variety of Chinese folk arts such as paintings, calligraphy, pottery, carpets, vases, books, scrolls, and chops.

Today the street is a mixture of state-run and privately owned shops, and customers are recommended to bargain before making purchases. There are also traditional teahouses and wineshops, as well as many restaurants.

It is a popular destination for tourists who wish to experience the commercial aspect of popular Chinese folk artwork in Beijing without the bustling traffic.
