= Brush pot =

Container for calligraphy brushes

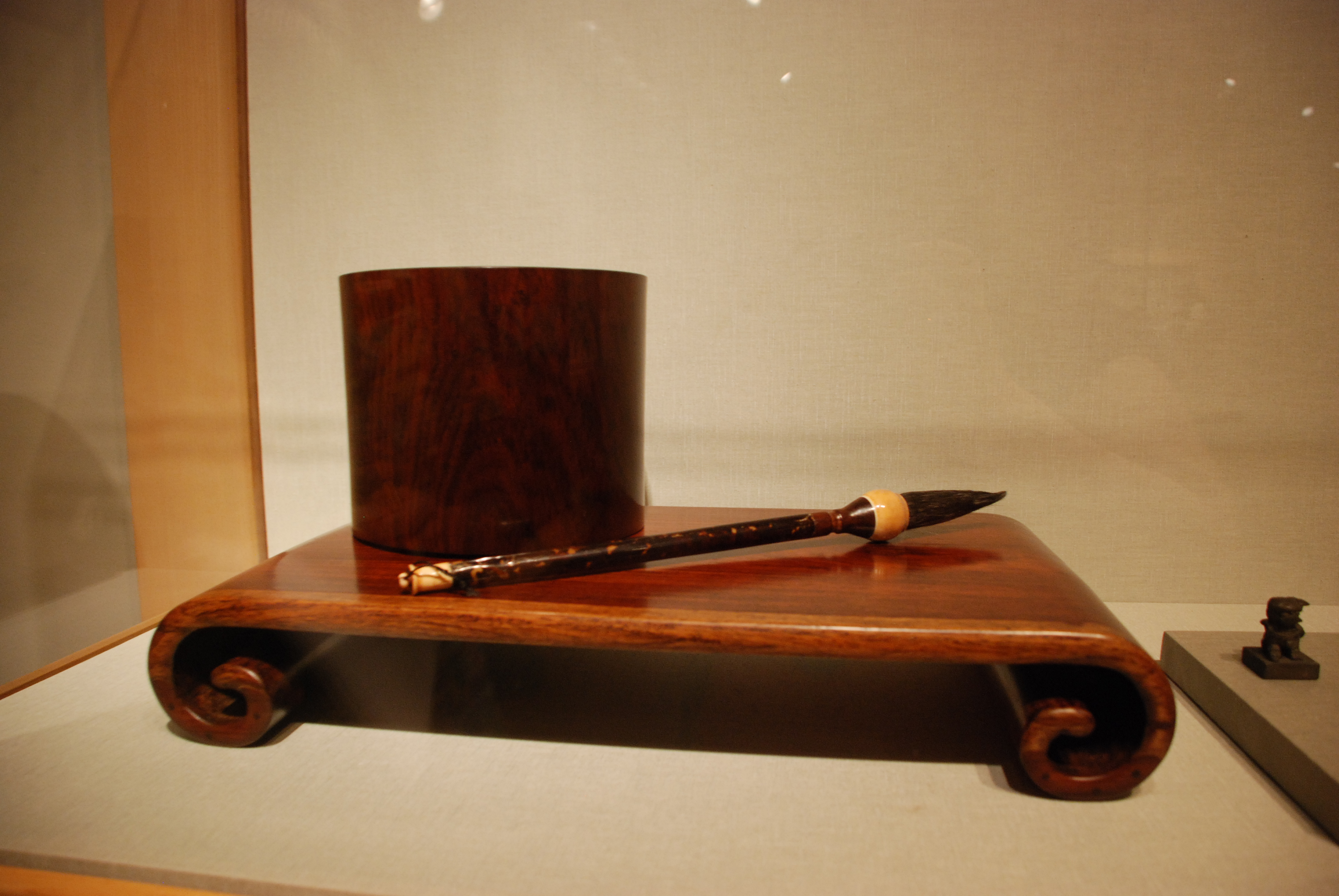
18th-century Qing dynasty bitong made of rosewood (hongmu), on a stand with a brush

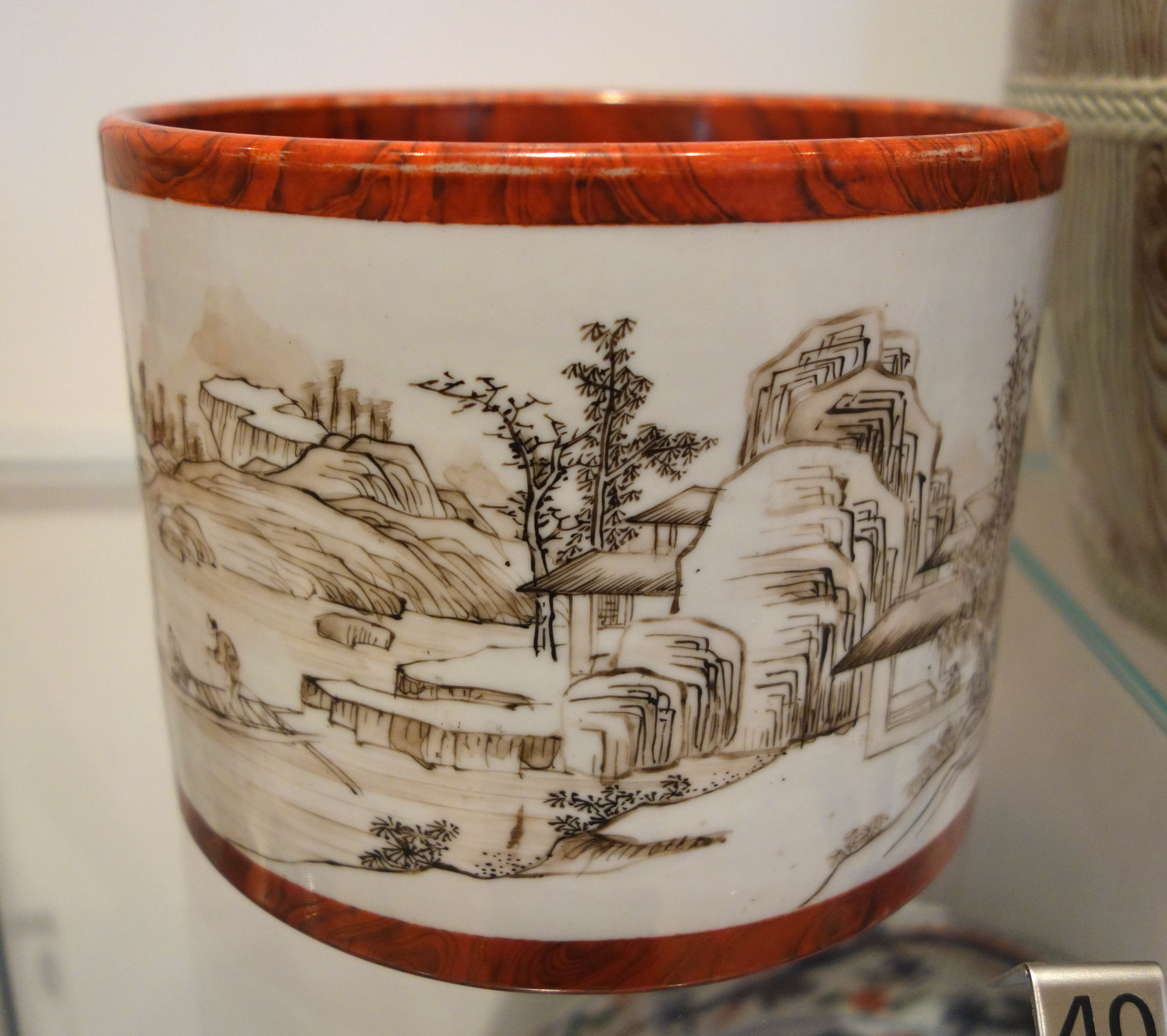
Jingdezhen brush pot, Yongzheng period, Qing dynasty, 1723-1735, glazed porcelain and enamels

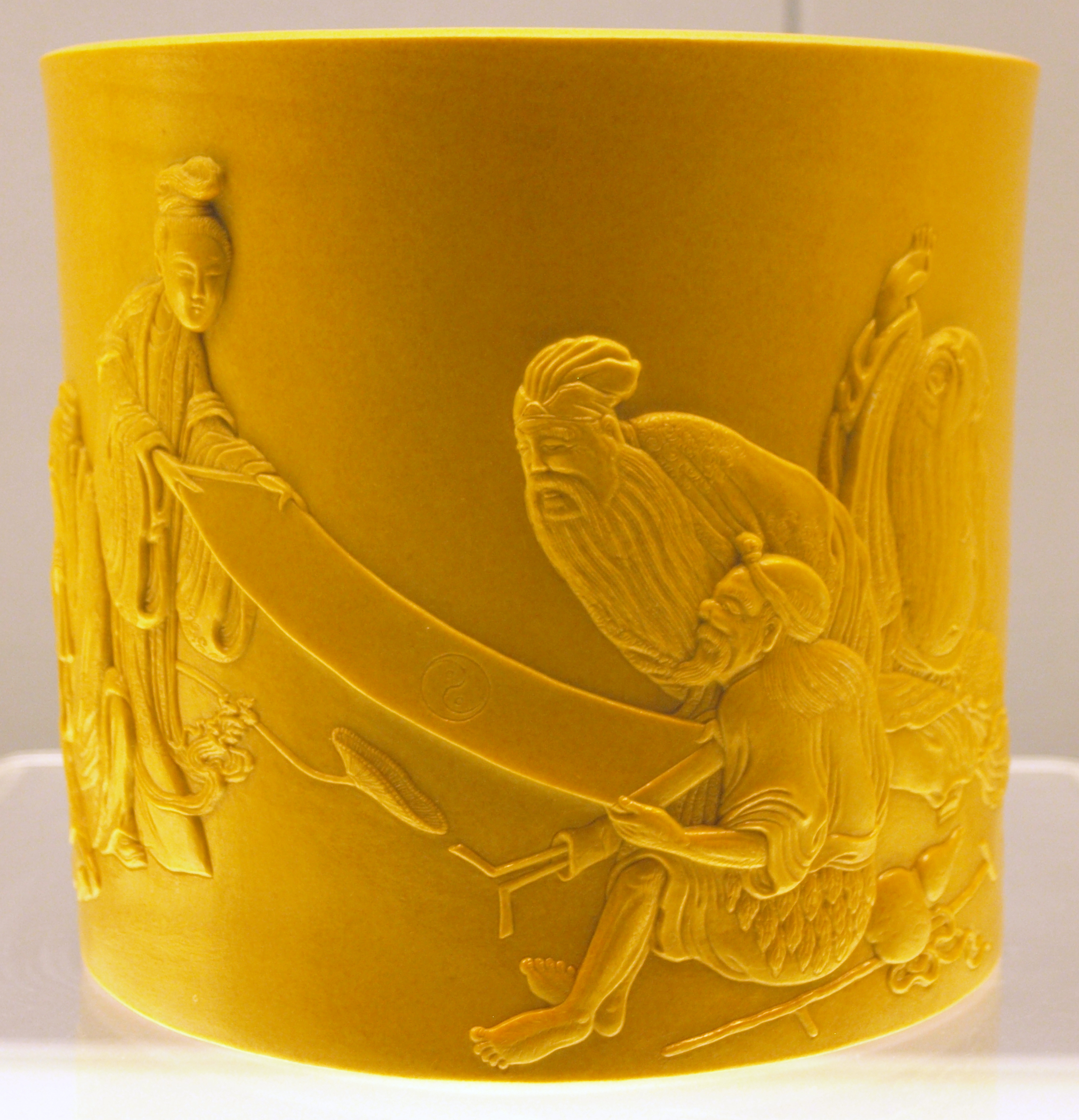
Qing dynasty, Jingdezhen ware

A brush pot (traditional Chinese: 筆筒; simplified Chinese: 笔筒; pinyin: bǐtǒng) is a container for holding the brushes used by scribes for Chinese calligraphy. These are typically carved from bamboo or jade with ornate motifs symbolising concepts such as longevity. Antique examples are now valued highly.

The brushes would be rinsed and stored in the pot with their handle down so that the bundles of hair would keep their shape and point.

== Background ==
=== In China ===
Bamboo curved brush pots were likely first produced in China, as bamboo was originally used there to create articles.

=== In Korea ===
After Neo-Confucianism was welcomed as the formal doctrine in Korea at the beginning of the Joseon era, the new intellectually aware and literate yangban replaced aristocrats and Buddhist monks. These yangban consisted of civil servants and military officials. This new elite ruling class spent a significant part of their time in writing calligraphy alongside reading. To satisfy this new demand, production of brush pots started in Korea.

== Structure ==
Made in wood, stone, porcelain and bamboo, brush pots were mostly cylindrical and were often decorated with traditional symbols inscribed on their body. During the Joseon era the royal family exclusively used the dragon motif for their brush pots. Later on the dragon decoration became a common theme. In China, Ivory for its plain but jade-like texture is considered an excellent material for brush pots. Ivory is used in Chinese brush pots because of its resemblance to bamboo.

== Value ==
High quality period Chinese brush pots can fetch high prices. In 2012, a Chinese brush pot made of bamboo was donated to a Bristol-based charity shop. When the shop sold the brush pot to raise funds for St Peter's Hospice, it was sold for £360,000 even though the rim had been mended with glue and the bamboo frame had a substantial crack. Examination of the brush pot discovered that it was made between 1662 and 1722 by Gu Jue, a well known old master of the time.

In the Skinner Asian Arts Auction, an 18th-century 6-inch (150 mm) bamboo Chinese brush pot was sold for $539,500. The pot was inscribed with detailed figures of immortals and animals set in mountainous landscapes.

In March 2019, the Art Institute of Chicago de-accessioned 22 Chinese jade carvings at a sale at Sotheby's New York. A white jade "Imperial Procession" brushpot from the Qing dynasty was sold for US$2,060,000.

== Uses ==
Brush pots were used by Chinese and Korean scholars between the 18th and 19th century. Calligraphy brushes were generally kept in the brush pots but intermittently, they were also used to stock paper rolls (rolled-up papers) hence they are sometime also called paper holders.
