= Zeniya =

2 Michelin star restaurant

Restaurant information
- Established: 1970
- Head chef: Shinichiro Takagi
- Food type: Kaiseki, Japanese
- Rating: 2 Michelin stars 1 Michelin green star
- Location: Kanazawa, Japan

Zeniya (銭屋) is a two Michelin-starred kaiseki restaurant located in Kanazawa, Ishikawa Prefecture, Japan. Known for its personalized approach to seasonal Japanese cuisine, Zeniya was founded in 1970 by the father of current chef Shinichiro Takagi. The restaurant emphasizes tradition, locality, and hospitality in the form of omotenashi.

== Concept and philosophy ==
Zeniya serves multi-course seasonal meals based on the principles of Kaga ryōri, the traditional cuisine of the former Kaga Domain. Unlike many kaiseki restaurants that offer fixed menus, Zeniya creates a custom menu for each guest. Chef Takagi personally asks diners about their preferences and backgrounds before designing a tailored sequence of courses. Every morning, the chefs visits the local market in Kanazawa to select ingredients, composing a menu that reflects the best of the season.

This approach is rooted in the restaurant’s long-standing ethos of dialogue, intuition, and care, and has remained unchanged since the time of Takagi’s father.

== Setting and design ==
Zeniya occupies the original wooden structure built by the Takagi family in 1970. The interior blends refined simplicity with traditional aesthetics. The main dining counter is made of hinoki wood, with subdued lighting and quiet tile tones. In addition to counter seating, Zeniya features private tatami rooms with views of a small garden, designed to provide a tranquil, intimate environment

Guests begin their meal with a hand-washing ritual and a welcome sake, reflecting both symbolic and sensory hospitality. The experience is designed to move slowly and intentionally, emphasizing stillness and presence.

== Tableware and craft ==
A hallmark of the Zeniya experience is its use of antique and artisanal Japanese tableware. Many of the vessels used in daily service are over 200 years old, dating back to the Edo period. The collection includes hand-lacquered Wajima-nuri trays, delicate Kutani ware bowls, and rare ceramic pieces passed down through generations of the Takagi family. Rather than being displayed behind glass or preserved as heirlooms, these objects are used as part of the meal itself—selected each day to match the tone, texture, and temperature of the food.

== Sustainability and recognition ==
Zeniya holds two stars in the Michelin Guide and was awarded a Michelin Green Star in 2021 for its sustainable practices, including local sourcing and low-waste operations. The restaurant is also a member of the international hospitality association Relais & Châteaux, which recognizes independent establishments known for culinary excellence and cultural authenticity.

== Recognition ==
- , Michelin Guide Japan
- , Michelin Guide Japan
- Member, Relais & Châteaux

== See also ==
- Kaiseki
- Japanese cuisine
- Omotenashi
- Michelin Guide
- Relais & Châteaux
