= Niki Nakayama =

American chef

- Born: 1975 (age 50–51); Los Angeles, California, U.S.
- Education: Southern California School of Culinary Arts
- Culinary career
- Cooking style: kaiseki
- Current restaurant: n/naka
- Previous restaurant: Azami Sushi Cafe
- Television show: Chef's Table
- Award won: Michelin stars
- Website: https://n-naka.com/

Niki Nakayama (born 1975) is an American chef and the owner of Michelin-starred n/naka restaurant in Los Angeles, specializing in modern Japanese kaiseki cuisine.

== Early life and career ==
Nakayama was born to Japanese parents in Koreatown in Los Angeles. Her parents worked as fish distributors and divorced when Nakayama was 12. She attended culinary school in Pasadena, after which she worked at Mori Sushi and then began a three-year working tour of Japan, where she immersed herself as much as possible "in the essentials of Japanese cuisine." While there, she cooked under chef Masa Sato at Shirakawa-Ya Ryokan, a Japanese country-style inn owned by her cousins that was renowned for its kaiseki cuisine.

Her experiences in Japan deeply influenced her, and upon returning to California, with help from her family she opened Azami Sushi Cafe (known for its all female staff), which became popular for its omakase menu. She sold that business in 2008 and worked in her sister's restaurant in Arcadia, running a pop-up called Inaka, which served as a fast-casual Japanese restaurant by day and a small eight-course chef's table venture at night. In 2011, she opened n/naka restaurant in Los Angeles, where she works with Carole Iida, who is a partner and sous chef. She has also taught classes in Japanese cooking.

== Restaurant and cooking style ==
At n/naka Nakayama serves a multi-course Japanese menu featuring seasonal ingredients and multiple preparation styles that showcase the chosen ingredients. This way of cooking is known as kaiseki. N/naka is known for serving 13-course meals in which the sequence of dishes has a natural flow and progression and for using highly seasonal ingredients, some from Nakayama's own home garden. "[T]he courses are structured to showcase ingredients using a sequence of preparations: A raw dish is followed by a grilled dish, then a braised or steamed dish, then a fried dish and so on, from light to heavy to light again. Nakayama's style of kaiseki, which she calls "modern kaiseki", is expressive of her own belief that the chef should never lose track of the ingredient's integrity, and that guests' experience in her restaurant is of the utmost importance. Since kaiseki is traditionally male, Nakayama works in closed kitchens, where patrons and diners cannot see her or take her gender into consideration when judging the cuisine. She says, "It's better that the guests just focus on the food versus who's making the food. With Japanese food, it's so easy to have an idea of what your chef should look like."

In 2014, she earned the StarChefs Rising Star Chef Award for her work at n/naka.

In 2019, n/naka was one of six Los Angeles restaurants to receive two stars in the Michelin Guide. Also in 2019 n/naka was named to Food & Wine's 30 best restaurants in the world.

In 2024, n/naka received one Michelin star, one of four Los Angeles restaurants to lose a star that year. Nakayama stated in response:

Although we are disappointed by Michelin's decision this year, we are grateful that it has given us an opportunity to reflect on what really matters. It is the journey, the highs and lows that shape who we are. This announcement further fuels our determination to keep pursuing the standards of excellence we believe in, and we remain fully committed to our goal of uplifting the human spirit. Bring it on.

== Television ==
In 2015, Nakayama was featured on episode four of the first season of Netflix's Chef's Table series in which she discusses her career and the many obstacles she has overcome, as well as the many influences that have shaped her into the renowned chef she has become. She was the culinary consultant for the 2019 Netflix film Always Be My Maybe.

== Personal life ==
She married her partner at n/naka, Carole Iida, in 2015.

== Bibliography ==
- Niki Nakayama: A Chef's Tale in 13 Bites; Farrar, Straus and Biroux; ISBN 978-0374313876; 2021
