= N/naka =

Kaiseki restaurant

n/naka
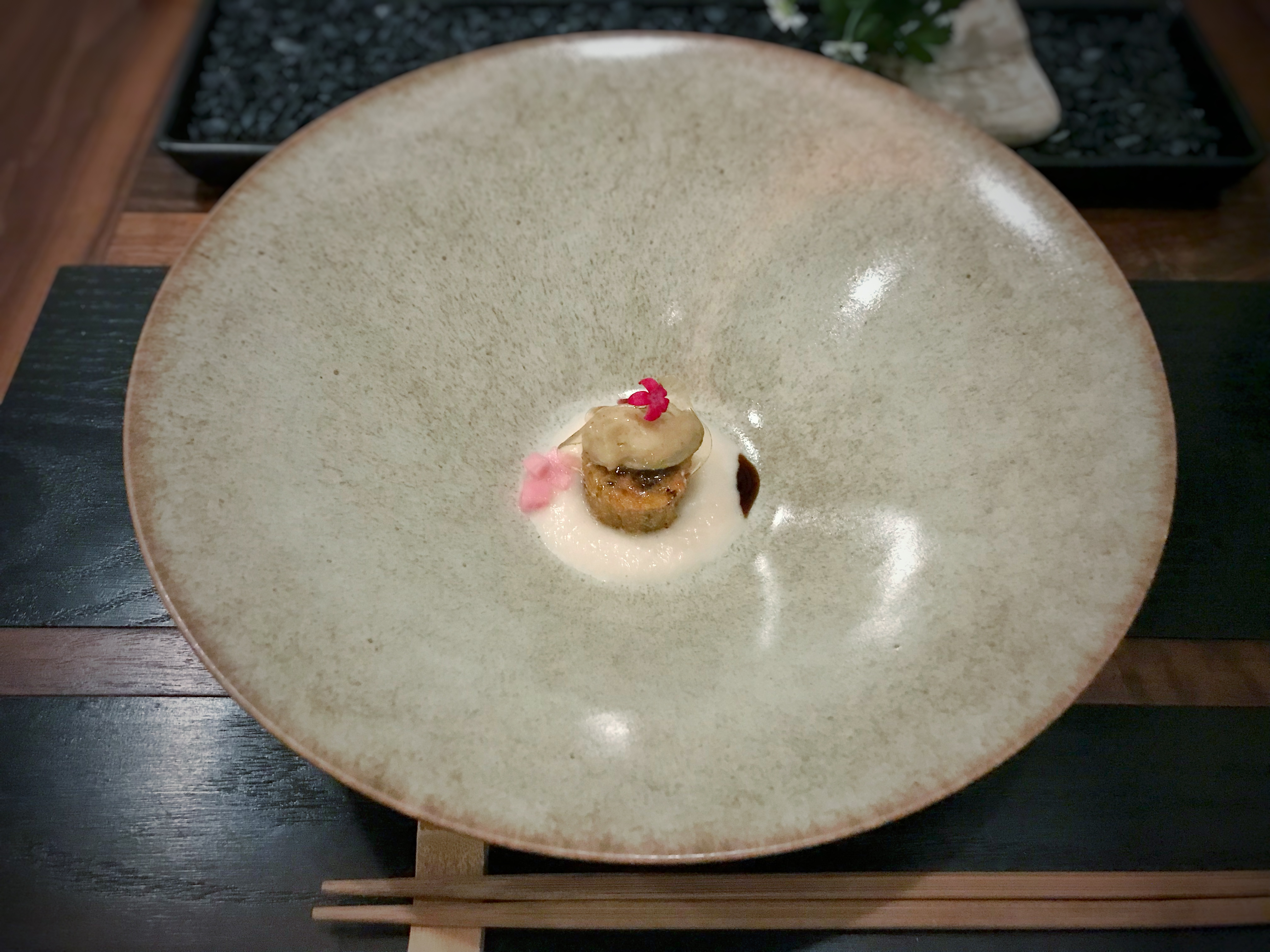
- Saki Zuke Kumamoto oyster
- Interactive map of n/naka

Restaurant information
- Established: 2011
- Owners: Niki Nakayama, Carole Iida
- Head chef: Niki Nakayama
- Food type: Kaiseki
- Dress code: Business casual
- Rating: (Michelin Guide)
- Location: 3455 S. Overland Avenue, Los Angeles, California, 90034, United States
- Coordinates: 34.0251246°N 118.412216°W
- Seating capacity: 26
- Reservations: Required
- Website: https://n-naka.com/

n/naka is a one-Michelin-star modern kaiseki restaurant located in the Palms neighborhood of Los Angeles, opened in 2011 by chef Niki Nakayama. Nakayama now co-owns the restaurant with her spouse, Carole Iida. It was named one of the 30 best restaurants in the world by Food & Wine in 2019 and held two Michelin stars from 2019 to 2024.

== History ==
Nakayama opened the restaurant in 2011 after selling her first venture, sushi restaurant Azami, in 2008. The name is a portmanteau of Nakayama's first and last name and also recalls the pop-up she ran in the interim, Inaka. Carole Iida, Nakayama's wife, is sous-chef and partner at n/naka. She joined n/naka in 2012.

As is the case with many kaiseki restaurants, most ingredients used at n/naka are sourced locally. Nakayama originally intended to build an open kitchen, with food preparation visible to diners, but ultimately decided against it, preferring that diners not see her and focus instead on the food. The restaurant was redesigned in 2024 to evoke a Japanese tea garden, with the wine storage wall relocated to the back wall and a curved wall and shoji screen now facing the entrance.

== Reviews and accolades ==
In 2019, n/naka was named to Food & Wine's 30 best restaurants in the world.

Also in 2019, n/naka received two stars in the first Michelin Guide to California restaurants, one of only five Los Angeles restaurants to be awarded two Michelin stars. In 2024, n/naka was awarded only one Michelin star, making it one of four Los Angeles restaurants to lose a Michelin star compared to the previous year. It retained its star in 2025.

The New Yorker has called n/naka the most prominent kaiseki restaurant in America. The restaurant is featured in the first season of the Netflix series Chef's Table.

== See also ==
- List of Michelin-starred restaurants in California
