= Shinichiro Takagi =

Japanese chef

- Born: 1970; Kanazawa, Ishikawa Prefecture, Japan
- Education: Nihon University's College of Commerce
- Culinary career
- Cooking style: Kaiseki, Kaga ryōri
- Current restaurant(s): Zeniya (Kanazawa) A_RESTAURANT (Kanazawa) Zeniya Singapore
- Television show(s): The Final Table (Netflix, 2018)
- Award(s) won: 2 × Michelin stars Michelin Green Star

Shinichiro Takagi is a Japanese kaiseki chef and restaurateur. He is the second-generation owner and executive chef of Zeniya in Kanazawa, which has held two Michelin stars since 2016 and received a Michelin Green Star in 2021. Takagi is known for promoting Kaga cuisine abroad and for opening the restaurant's first overseas branch, Zeniya Singapore, in 2023.

== Early life and training ==
Takagi was born in Kanazawa. After a year of study in the United States, he graduated from Ishikawa Prefectural Kanazawa Izumigaoka High School. He later earned a degree in commercial science from Nihon University.

== Career ==
Takagi apprenticed under Koji Tokuoka at Kyoto Kitcho before returning to his family restaurant, Zeniya, in 1996.

=== Zeniya, Kanazawa ===
Takagi became representative director of Zeniya in 2008, working with his younger brother, executive chef Jiro Takagi. The restaurant was awarded two stars in the Michelin Guide Toyama/Ishikawa (Kanazawa) in 2016 and retained them in subsequent editions. It also earned a Michelin Green Star for sustainability in 2021. Zeniya joined Relais & Châteaux in June 2016.

=== International work ===
Since 2008, Takagi has staged guest-chef events or culinary demonstrations in New York, Paris, Milan, Seoul, Hamburg, Munich, the Maldives, Turin, Napa Valley, Hong Kong, Singapore, Abu Dhabi, Sydney and Cape Town. He appeared on the Netflix competition series The Final Table in 2018, partnering with chef Ronald Hsu to represent Japan.

=== Business ventures ===
- OPENSAUCE Inc. – Co-founded in 2017 with Hitoshi Miyata, Taizo Son and Atsushi Taira; Takagi is chief culinary officer.
- A_RESTAURANT – Experimental dining space in Kanazawa opened in 2019.
- Zeniya Singapore – Opened 14 August 2023 in Shaw Centre Singapore. Preceding this location, Zeniya's Singapore branch used to reside in Shangri La Singapore.

== Awards and honours ==
- 2011 – Master Chef Award, World Gourmet Summit, Singapore
- 2016 – Cultural Merit Award, Japan Society of Boston
- 2016 – present – Two Michelin Stars, Michelin Guide Toyama–Ishikawa.
- 2021 – Michelin Green Star, Michelin Guide Japan.
- 2017 – Japanese Cuisine Goodwill Ambassador, Ministry of Agriculture, Forestry and Fisheries (Japan).
