= Ma Shouzhen =

Chinese artist and poet (1548–1604)

- 馬守真
- Born: c. 1548; Nanjing, China
- Died: 1604
- Other names: Ma Xianglan, Yuejiao
- Occupations: Yiji, artist, poet

Ma Shouzhen (Chinese: 馬守真; c. 1548–1604), also known by her courtesy name Ma Xianglan (Chinese: 馬湘蘭, meaning "Orchid of the Xiang River") and pen name Yuejiao ("Lunar Beauty"), was a Chinese courtesan and artist born in Nanjing during the late Ming dynasty (1550–1644). She was a renowned painter, poet, and composer, receiving the name Xianglan because her most favored paintings were of orchids.

== Biography ==
Ma was born in Nanjing, although little of her early life is known. At the age of 15, Ma Shouzhen formally assumed the position of a Yiji, or performing courtesan. Her first known painting also dates from this year. Before this, she may have received her education from a proprietor who owned her during her childhood.

Ma lived in the entertainment district along the Qinhuai River, leading to her later becoming known as one of the Eight Beauties of Qinhuai. As a matriarch in Yiji society, she encouraged the education and training of student Yijis in the arts. In order to maintain her reputation as an elite Yiji, she only allowed educated men or young aristocrats within her residence. She was known as a knight-errant, as she gave many gifts to young men and was cavalier with her money.

During the late Ming dynasty, elite Yijis challenged the gender stereotypes of Confucian values. In contrast to the women of the gentry, who were often discouraged from cultivating talent lest it undermine their virtue as wives and mothers, Yijis were educated in painting, poetry, and music. In addition, they owned property and participated in public life.

Ma's first patron, Pen Niang, was a student of Wen Zhengming. After Pen's death, when she was eighteen, she took on Wang Zhideng, a poet, as her new patron, and developed a talent for writing poetry. Other poets and intellectuals she befriended include Zhou Tianqiu, Xu Wei, and Xue Mingyi. Most wrote poems inspired by her or for her, describing Ma as beautiful with a warm and welcoming personality. During their visits, Ma would join them in composing paintings, poems, and plays. She also hosted parties on her multi-leveled house-boat with noted literati as her guests.

Ma died peacefully in her residence in Nanjing in 1604. After her death, she was widely ridiculed for beings a courtesan who had desired to become part of a gentry family.

== Romance with Wang Zhideng ==
Ma Shouzhen and Wang Zhideng were sexual and business partners. They shared a loving relationship with one another, and are known to have openly expressed their affection for each other.

Wang wrote an account of their meeting. He recounted that they met when Ma was sued by a young literatus for bad treatment, with the court clerk arriving to arrest Ma while Wang was visiting. Wang intervened, and was able to make a deal by offering a sample of his calligraphy in exchange for Ma's freedom. Ma was touched by the gesture, and proposed to Wang, but he refused, stating he did not want to take advantage of the situation. Even so, Ma and Wang frequently wrote letters to each other afterwards, and Ma would often send gifts to Wang his wife.

Ma and Wang collaborated in several paintings and poems. One of their famous collaborations was Narcissus and Rock, which consists of two images and a poem. When Ma published her poems in 1591, Wang wrote a preface for them.

Ma and Wang's relationship may have been the basis for the 1597 opera Bailianqun (White Silk Skirt), which ridiculed a sexually active older couple. The play was quickly banned due to it being perceived as immoral, but the text itself gained popularity. However, some modern scholars believe that Ma and Wang were not actually the inspiration for the play.

On one occasion, Ma took her house-boat to Suzhou. Wang recollected that this was in celebration for his 70th birthday, although scholar Zhao Mi notes this as unlikely due to the commercial requirements of a theatrical tour. Not long after this, Ma fell ill. She wrote letters to Wang begging him to visit her - which still survive - but it is unknown if he did. Regardless, Wang wrote twelve eulogies for Ma after her death, as well as a biography, Maji zhuan (Biography of Courtesan Ma).

== Artistic work ==
=== Painting ===
Ma fashioned herself as a painter in the style of the Wen circle and Wu School. So highly regarded was her work that clients came from as far afield as Thailand to purchase it. As a painter, Ma is well known for landscapes, orchids, and bamboo imagery combined with calligraphy. Her brush work is delicate, and the images have either light colors or monochrome ink. Her preferred painting surfaces include fans, hand-scrolls, and hanging scrolls. Ma was known for using the double outline technique, pioneered by Zhao Mengjian, in which the edges of her leaves and blossoms are outlined with thin lines. Similarly, her paintings of bamboo were in the style of Guan Daosheng. The only paintings by Ma that survive today are examples of her ink landscapes, orchids, and bamboo. Since she was a social person, many of her paintings may have been given away as gifts at parties.

Because of her fame, Ma's paintings were often copied.

=== Theater ===
Along with painting, Ma was skilled in writing poetry and dramas, although most of the latter have been lost over time. Ma was involved in the theater as a performer and playwright, as well as being the only known courtesan/woman to own a theater troupe in late Ming theater. This last job included presenting onstage, tutoring performers, and touring with her troupe, which was known for northern plays.

Ma also was the author of at least one play, Sansheng ji (Story of Three Lives). The play is an adaptation of A Southern Song (1127-1279), a play about a student betraying his courtesan lover. As courtesan theatre was infrequently highlighted in Ming theatre, some male dramatists believed The Story of three Lives had been ghostwritten. The play is about love and betrayal in three lives. In the first, Wang Kui betrays courtesan Guiying, who had supported his study, by marrying another after. In the second life, the courtesan Su Qing (Guiying) abandons student Feng Kui (Wang Kui). In their third life, they repay their debt of love and marry.

=== Poetry ===
Ma published her first collection of poetry in 1591, with an introduction by Wang Zhideng.

=== Patronage ===
Ma also served as a patron of the arts. She funded Liang Chenyu's Hongxian nü (Lady Hongxian) in return for Liang writing poems for her.

== Legacy ==
Ma's life was first recorded by her lover and close friend, Wang Zhideng. Within fifty years of her death, Qian Qianyi, husband of fellow Qinhuai Beauty Liu Rushi, documented Wang's version of Ma's life in his poetry. In addition, Wang Duanshu praised Ma in a collection of female poets.

During the Qing Dynasty, famous actors in the Liyuan of the Capital adapted the story of Ma Shouzhen's painting of orchids into a drama and presented the paintings in the drama to guests. Therefore, a large number of forgeries appeared in the name of Ma Shouzhen, and they even entered the court of the Qing Dynasty. The "Shiqu Baoji Chubian" (石渠宝笈初编) contains a fake copy of Ma Shouzhen's "Painted Orchid Scroll" (画兰卷). But the Qing court also collected authentic paintings by Ma Shouzhen. The "Flower Scroll" (花卉卷) in the Wuxi Museum collection is from an old collection of the Qing Dynasty court, and is also recorded in the "Shiqu Baoji". Emperor Qianlong of the Qing Dynasty also viewed Ma Shouzhen's paintings and stamped the oval seal of "the treasures previewed by Emperor Qianlong" (乾隆御览之宝) on her paintings.

In 1994, a crater on Venus was named after Ma.

== List of Works ==
- Orchid and Bamboo, (fan) ink on golden paper, in the Palace Museum Collection
- Orchid, Bamboo, and Rock, (fan) ink on golden paper, in the Palace Museum Collection
- Orchid, Bamboo, and Rock, (hand-scroll) ink on golden paper, in the Palace Museum Collection
- Orchid and Rock, (hanging scroll) ink on paper, in the Metropolitan Museum of Art Online Collection
- Hanging scroll with bamboo and orchids on a rock, ink on paper, in the Rijksmuseum Collection

== Gallery ==
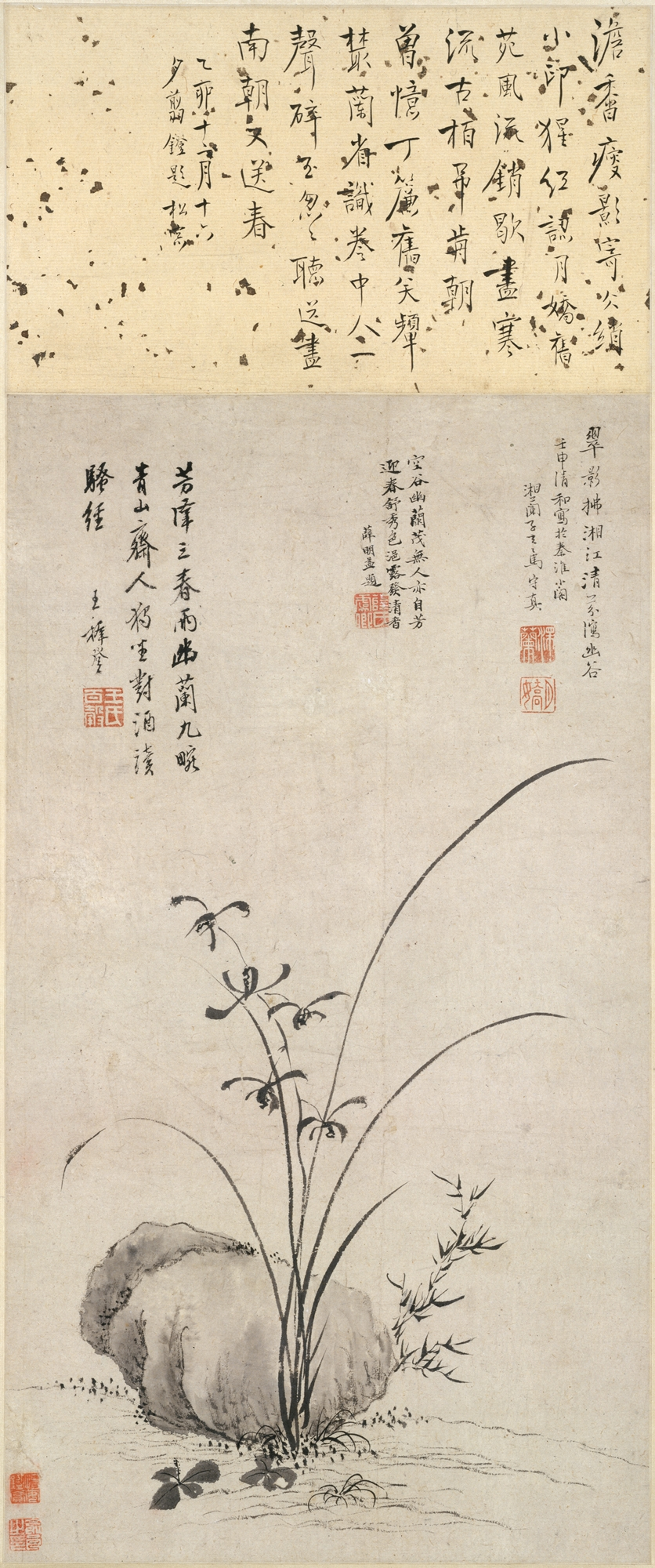
Ma Shouzhen, Orchid and Rock, 1572, Metropolitan Museum of Art

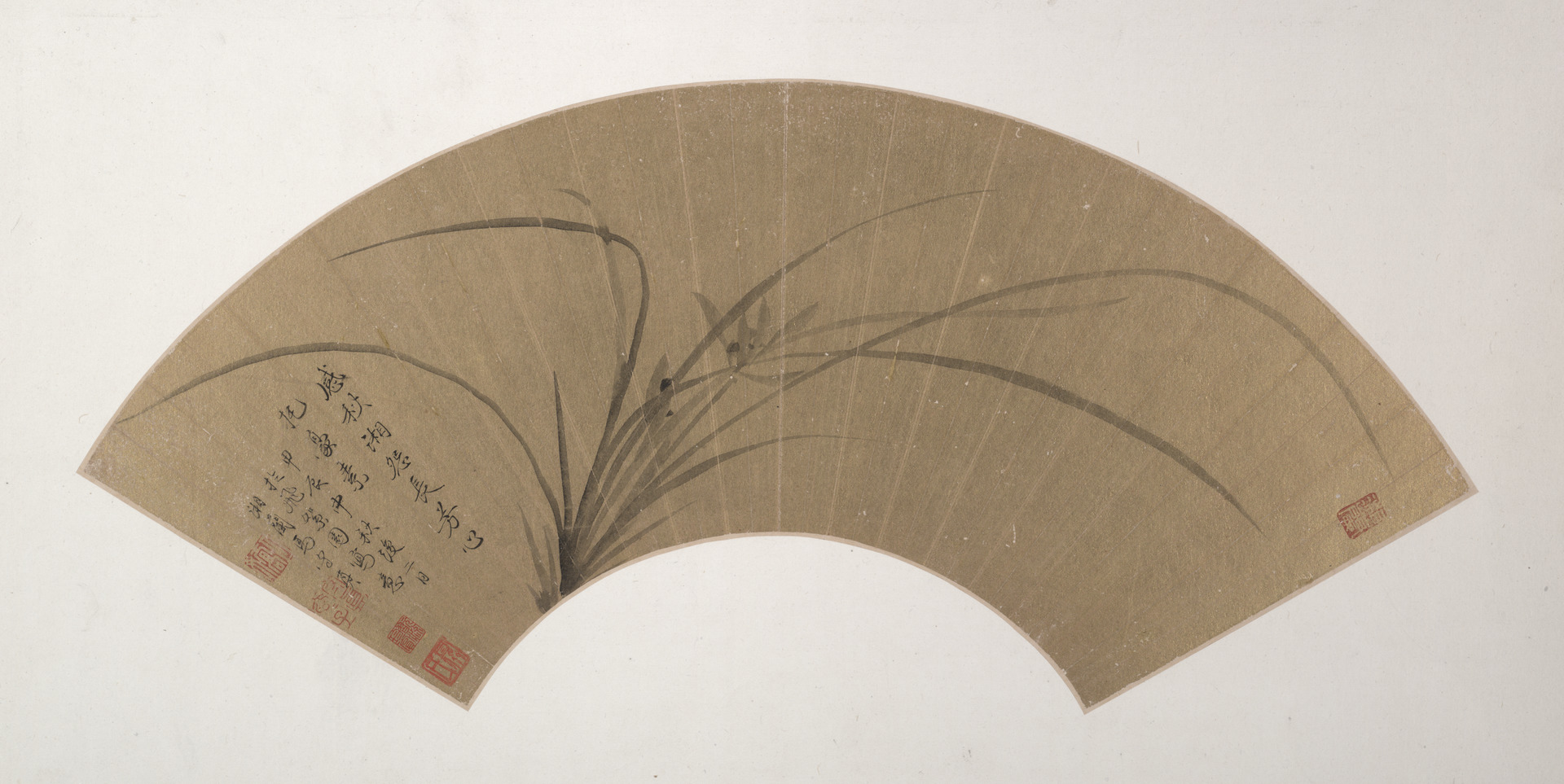
Ma Shouzhen, Orchid, 1604, Yale University Art Gallery

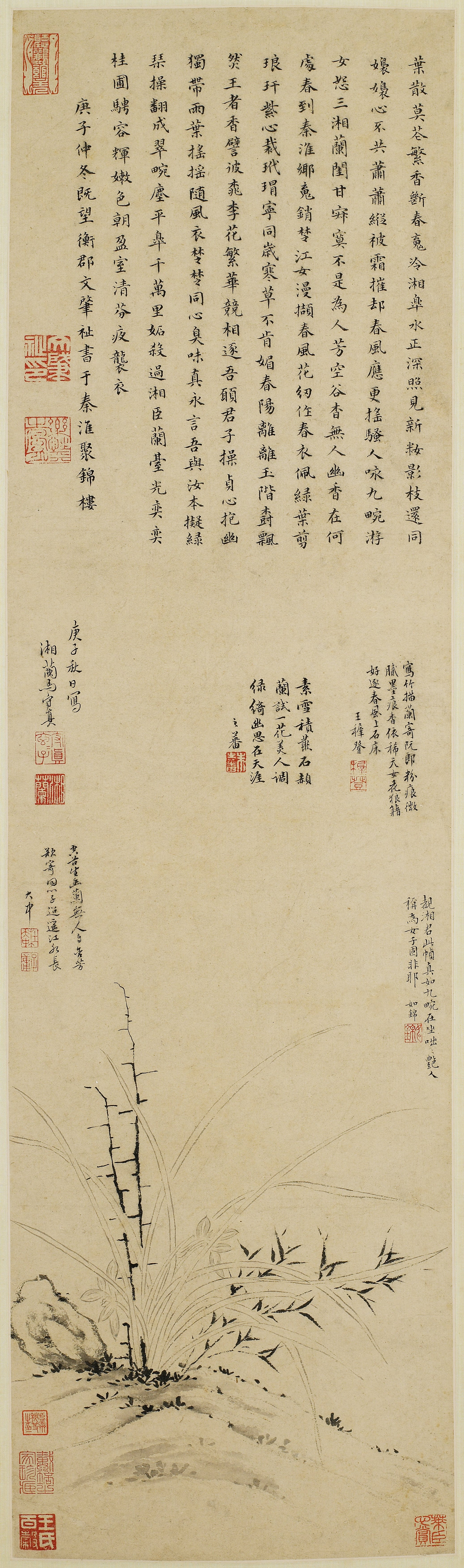
Ma Shouzhen, Orchid and Bamboo, Minneapolis Institute of Art
