= Three Friends of Winter =

East Asian art motif of the pine, bamboo and plum

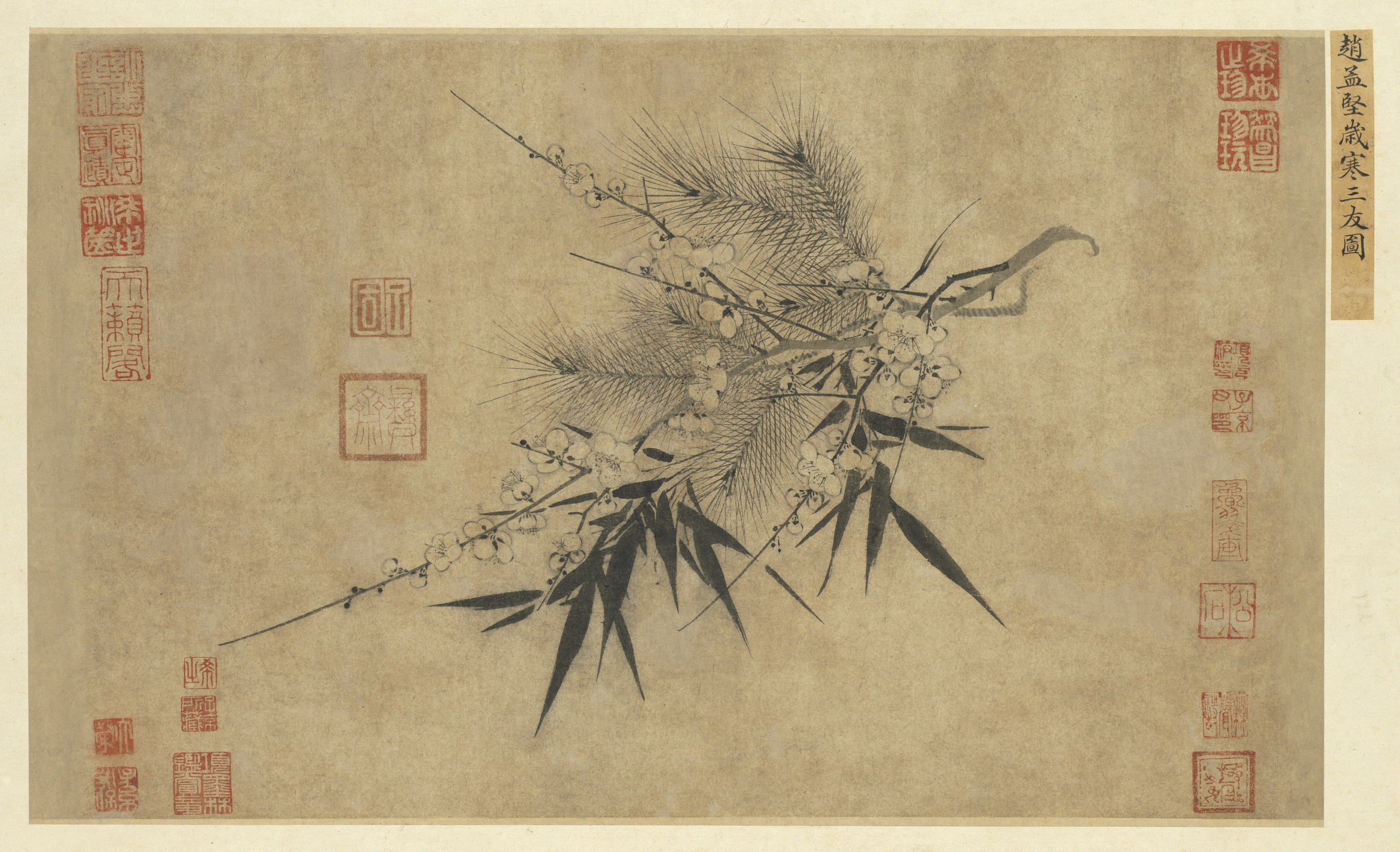
- The Three Friends of Winter by the painter Zhao Mengjian, Song dynasty

Chinese name
- Traditional Chinese: 歲寒三友
- Simplified Chinese: 岁寒三友
Transcriptions
Standard Mandarin
- Hanyu Pinyin: suìhán sānyǒu

Vietnamese name
- Vietnamese alphabet: Tuế hàn tam hữu
- Chữ Hán: 歲寒三友

Korean name
- Hangul: 세한삼우
- Hanja: 歲寒三友
Transcriptions
- Revised Romanization: sehansamu
- McCune–Reischauer: sehansamu

Japanese name
- Kanji: 歳寒三友
- Hiragana: さいかんさんゆう
Transcriptions
- Romanization: Saikan san'yū

The Three Friends of Winter is an art motif that comprises the pine, bamboo, and plum. The Chinese celebrated the pine (松), bamboo (竹) and Chinese flowering plum (梅) together, for they observed that unlike many other plants these plants do not wither as the cold days deepen into the winter season. Known by the Chinese as the Three Friends of Winter, they later entered the conventions of Korean, Japanese, and Vietnamese culture. Together they symbolize steadfastness, perseverance, and resilience. They are highly regarded in Confucianism as representing its scholar-gentleman ideal.

== History ==
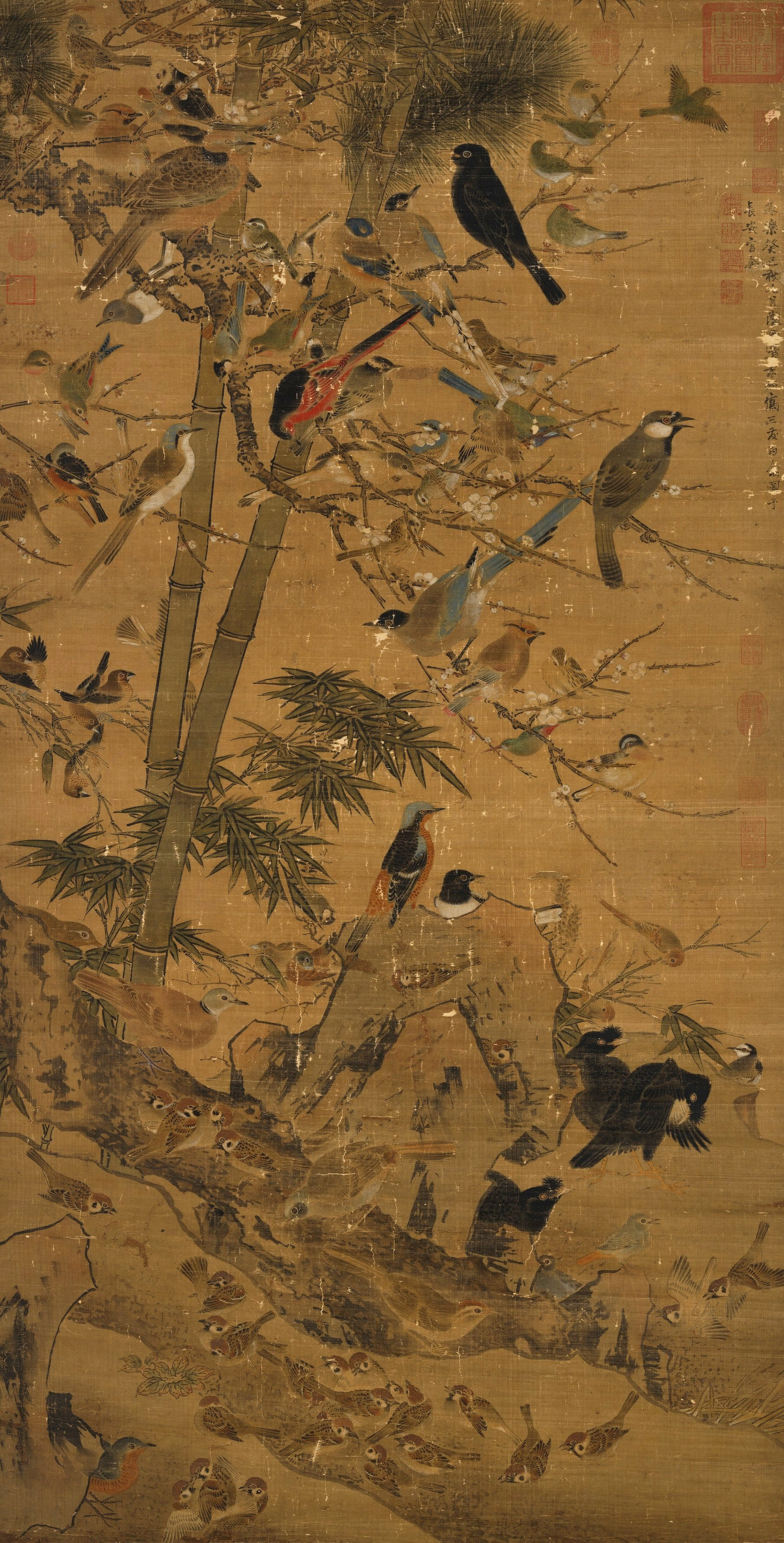
Three Friends and a Hundred Birds by Bian Wenjin, Ming dynasty

The Three Friends of Winter are common in works of art from Chinese culture and those cultures influenced by it. The three are first recorded as appearing together in a ninth-century poem by the poet Zhu Qingyu (朱慶餘) of the Tang dynasty. Artists such as Zhao Mengjian (趙孟堅, c. 1199–1264) of the Southern Song dynasty and other contemporaries later made this grouping popular in painting.

The earliest literary reference to the term "[Three] Friends of Winter" can be traced back to the Record of the Five-cloud Plum Cottage (五雲梅舍記) from The Clear Mountain Collection (霽山集) by the writer Lin Jingxi (林景熙, 1242–1310) of the Song dynasty:

For his residence, earth was piled to form a hill and a hundred plum trees, which along with lofty pines and tall bamboo comprise the friends of winter, were planted.

即其居累土為山，種梅百本，與喬松，脩篁為歲寒友。

== Outside China ==
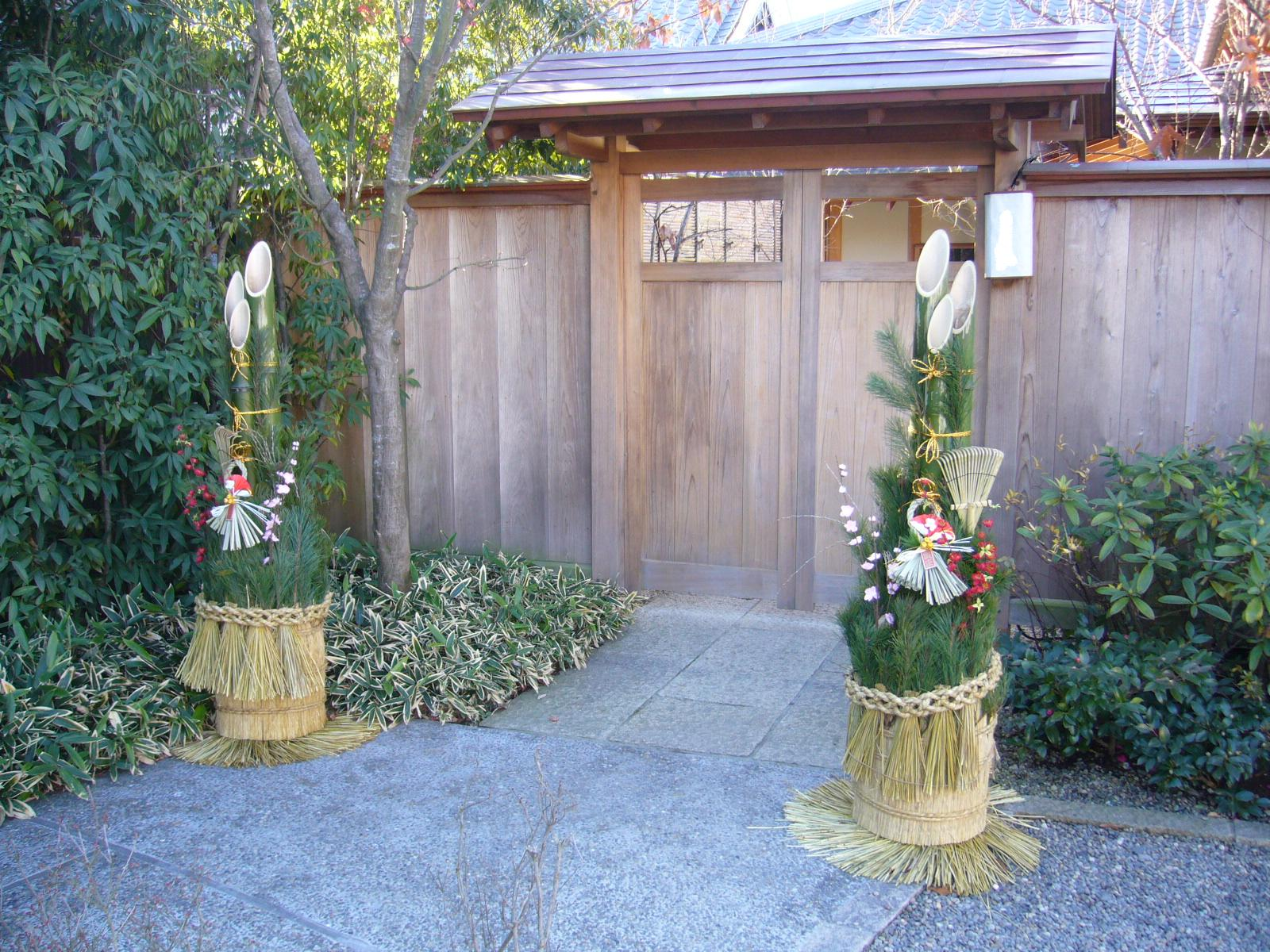
Kadomatsu (門松) decorative pillars for Japanese New Year, featuring branches of pine, bamboo and plum

The Three Friends are known as shōchikubai (松竹梅; lit. 'pine-bamboo-plum') in Japan. They are particularly associated with the start of the Lunar New Year, appearing on greeting cards and as a design stamped into seasonal sweets. They are sometimes also used as a three-tier ranking system; in this context, the pine (松, matsu) is usually the highest rank, followed by the bamboo (竹, take) as the middle rank, and the plum (梅, ume) as the lowest.

In a Korean sijo poem by Kim Yu-gi (김유기; 金裕器, a famous singer at the court of Sukjong of Joseon, two of the friends are brought together in order to underline the paradoxical contrast with "peach and plum of springtime", a reference to young ladies from the Chang Hen Ge:

Peach and plum of springtime, don't flaunt your pretty blossoms;
Consider rather the old pine and green bamboo at year's end.
What can change these noble stems and their flourishing evergreen?

춘풍(春風) 도리화(桃李花)들아 고운 양자(樣子) 자랑 말고
장송(長松) 녹죽(綠竹)을 세모(歲暮)에 보려무나.
정정(亭亭)코 낙락(落落)한 절(節)을 고칠 줄이 있으랴.

In Vietnam, the three along with chrysanthemum create a combination of four trees and flowers usually seen in pictures and decorative items. The four also appear in works but mostly separately with the same symbolic significance. They are known as Tuế hàn tam hữu in Vietnamese.

== See also ==
- Chinese culture
- Four Gentlemen of the Year
- Four Treasures of the Study
- Trees in Chinese mythology and cultural symbology
- Mirror Flower, Water Moon
