= Trees in Chinese mythology and cultural symbology =

Trees in Chinese mythology and culture tend to range from more-or-less mythological such as the Fusang tree and the Peaches of Immortality cultivated by Xi Wangmu to mythological attributions to such well-known trees, such as the pine, the cypress, the plum and other types of prunus, the jujube, the cassia, and certain as yet unidentified trees. Mythological ideas about trees also extends to various types of fungi which lived or were thought to live underneath certain of these trees, collecting their mysterious essences.

== Pine, cypress, and fir ==
The pine, cypress, and fir are linked by being similar evergreens. Old pine trees are much admired and venerated. Some examples of Chinese cultural symbology can be found in the poetry of Six Dynasties poet Tao Yuanming (365?–427). According to Yeh Chia-ying, one of Tao's most frequently used metaphors is that of the pine tree: symbol of ability to withstand the adversity of cold winds, to withstand the adversity of frosts, nevertheless retaining its own essential character: a situation which can be compared with that of certain persons of metaphorically similar character.

The pine is a particular motif in Chinese art and literature, which sometimes combines painting and poetry in the same work. The pine symbolises longevity and steadfastness, as it retains its green needles throughout the year. Sometimes the pine and cypress are paired. At other times the pine, plum, and bamboo are considered as the "Three Friends of Winter".

== Peach, pear, and plum ==
The peach, pear, and plum are linked by being in the genus Prunus. All three of these plants are important in Chinese symbolism.

The plum is featured extensively in Chinese art and poetry. It is included as one of the "Three Friends of Winter" alongside the pine and bamboo, regarded as one of the "Four Gentlemen" of flowers in Chinese art, together with the orchid, chrysanthemum, and bamboo., and one of the "Flowers of the Four Seasons", which consist of the orchid (spring), the lotus (summer), the chrysanthemum (autumn) and the plum blossom (winter).

Peaches are symbolic in cultural traditions such as in art, paintings, and folk tales. Peach blossoms are highly prized in Chinese culture. The ancient Chinese believed the peach to possess more vitality than any other tree because their blossoms appear before leaves sprout. When early rulers of China visited their territories, they were preceded by sorcerers armed with peach rods to protect them from spectral evils. On New Year's Eve, local magistrates would cut peach wood branches and place them over their doors to protect against evil influences. Peach wood was used for door gods during the Han. Similarly, peach trees were planted near the front door of a house to bring good fortune. The deity Shòu Xīng (Chinese: 寿星), a god of longevity, is usually depicted with a peach in his right hand due its associations with a long life.

Pears feature in the folktale "Growing Pears" (simplified Chinese: 种梨; traditional Chinese: 種梨; pinyin: Zhǒng Lí), also variously translated as "Planting a Pear Tree", "Sowing Pears", and "The Wonderful Pear Tree", is a short story by Pu Songling, first published in Strange Tales from a Chinese Studio. Set in ancient China, the story revolves around a miserly pear seller and a Taoist priest. In China, the term "sharing a pear" (Chinese: 分梨; pinyin: fēn lí) is a homophone of "separate" (simplified Chinese: 分离; traditional Chinese: 分離; pinyin: fēnlí). As a result, sharing a pear with a loved one can be read as a desire to separate from them..

== Fusang ==
The Fusang tree appears as a more mythological tree, although sometimes claimed to be just like some kind of mulberry.

== Three Friends in Winter ==
The 'three friends in winter' is a motif frequently seen in Chinese art. The motif consists of pines, bamboos, and Chinese flowering plum trees or else plum trees and a stone. The symbolism is that of longevity, constancy, and flowering during winter, before it is yet spring. In Chinese cultural symbology, this motif is considered suitable to send to those who are poor or lonely. The three friends of winter motif is known as early as the Song dynasty work the Jishanji (霽山集), or, in English, the "Clear Mountain Collection" by Lin Jingxi (林景熙), who lived 1242–1310.

== Glossary ==
Chinese terms related to trees in Chinese mythology and cultural symbology:

- Cypress: (Chinese: 柏; pinyin: bǎi)
- Fusang: (Chinese: 扶桑; pinyin: Fú Sāng)
- Peach: (Chinese: 桃; pinyin: táo)
- Pine (sometimes also used for similar evergreen conifers, such as fir): (Chinese: 松; pinyin: sōng)
- Plum: (Chinese: 李; pinyin: lǐ)
- Chinese flowering plum or plum blossom: (Chinese: 梅; pinyin: méi)
- Three Friends in Winter: (simplified Chinese: 岁寒三友; traditional Chinese: 歲寒三友; pinyin: suìhán sānyǒu) or just (Chinese: 三友; pinyin: sānyǒu)

== Gallery ==
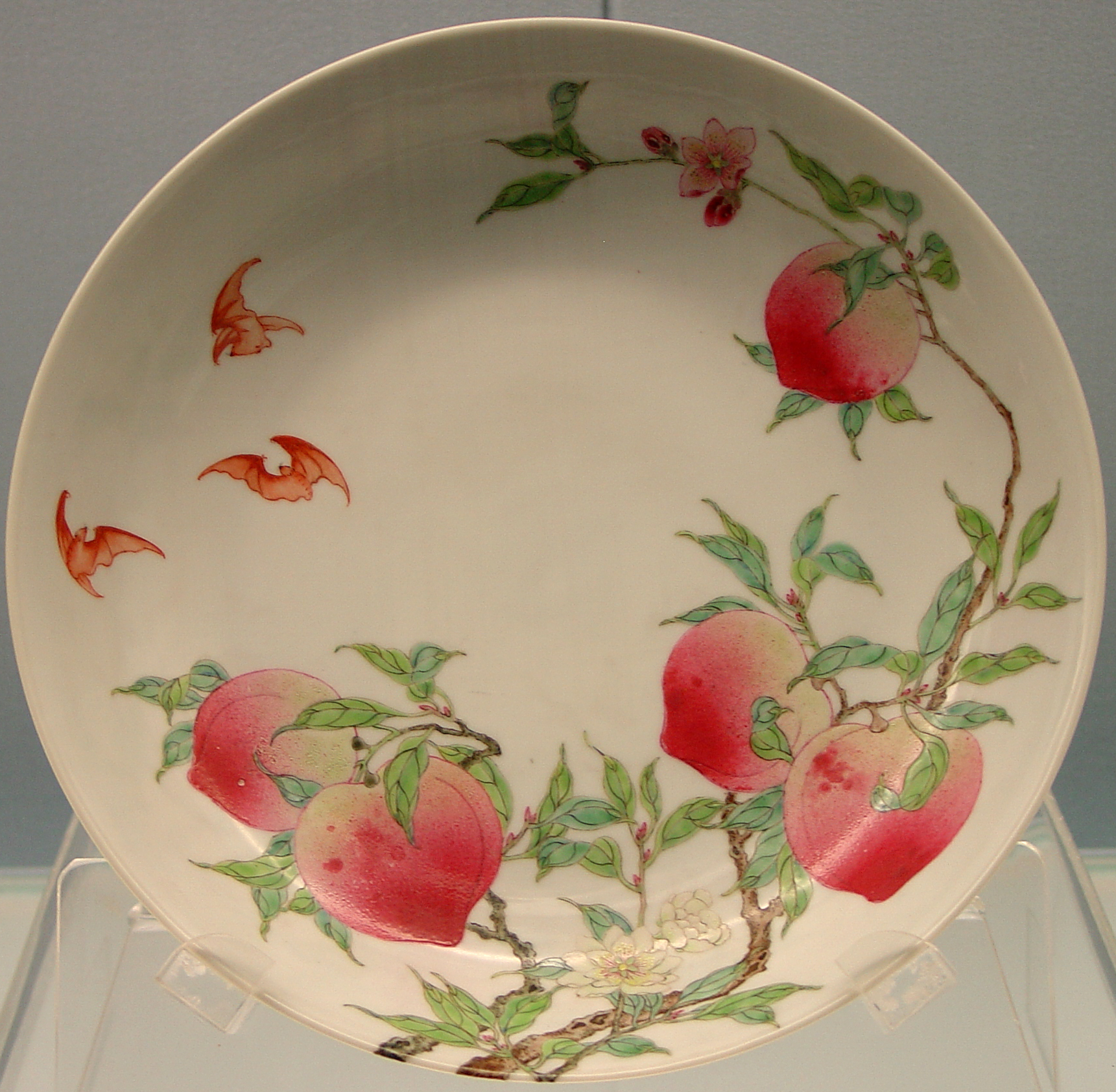
Porcelain bowl: the peaches symbolize longevity and health, the bats add the idea of good luck and happiness.

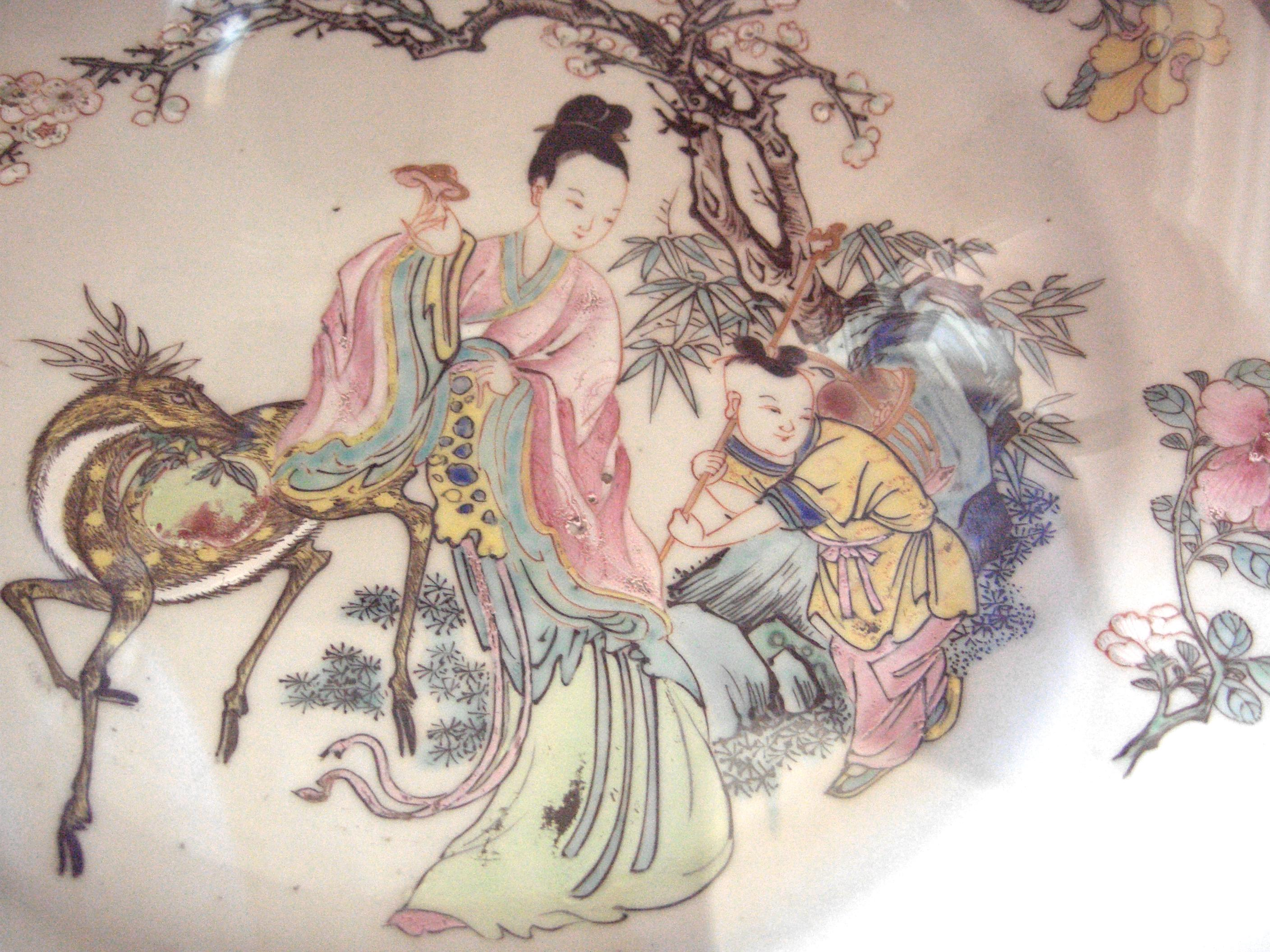
Xi Wangmu on a Qing dynasty porcelain plate, beneath a flowering prunus tree

== See also ==
- Bamboo
- Chinese mythology, for general information
- Four Gentlemen
- Ink stick
- Peaches of Immortality
- Penghou
- Pinus armandii
- Three Friends of Winter
- Wolfiporia extensa
- Xi Wangmu
- Yu Shi
