= Peaches of Immortality =

Chinese mythological fruit

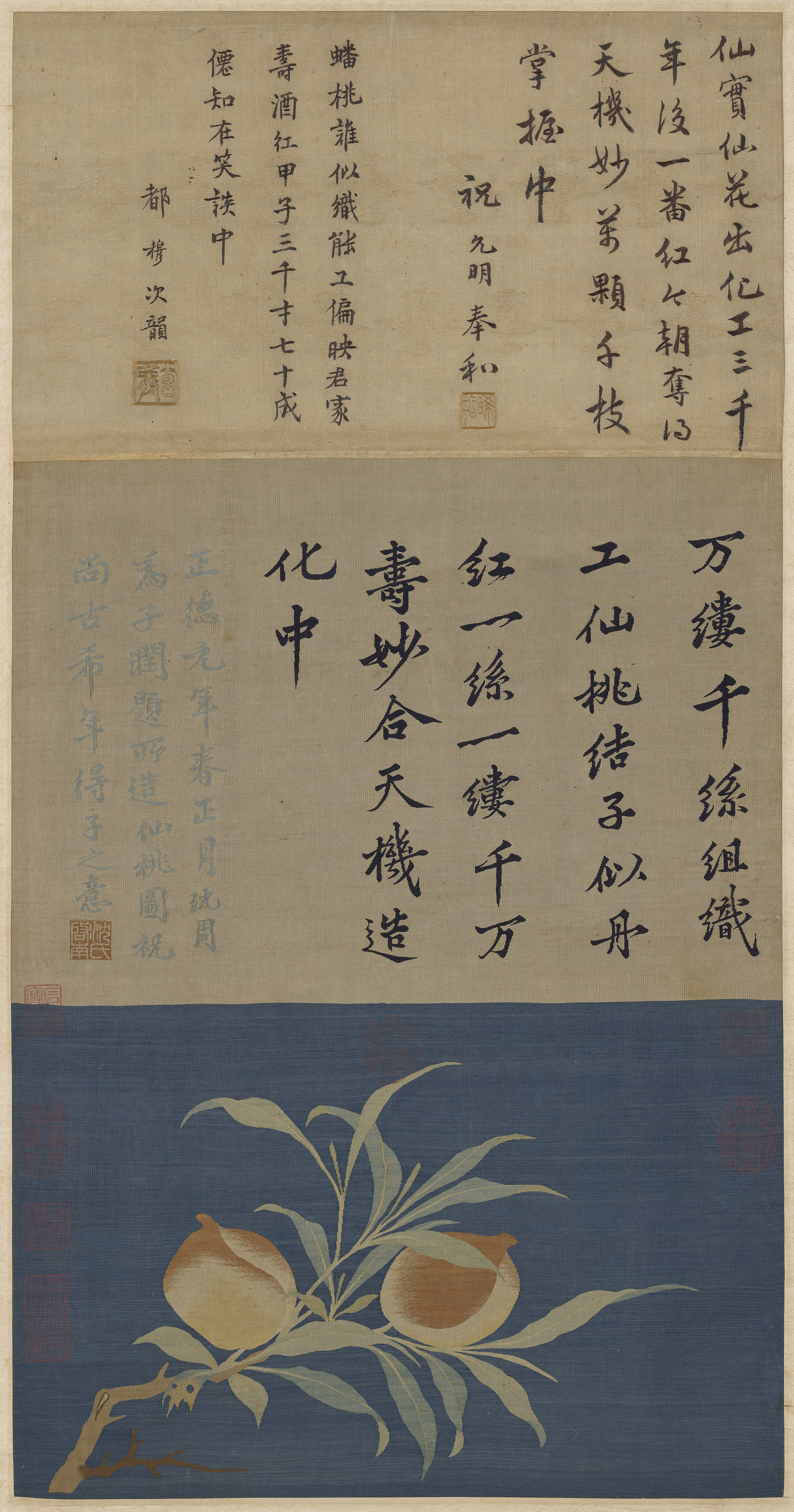
Peaches of Immortality Tapestry, Ming dynasty (National Palace Museum)

In Chinese mythology, Peaches of Immortality (Chinese: 仙桃; pinyin: xiāntáo; Cantonese Yale: sīn tòuh or Chinese: 蟠桃; pinyin: pántáo; Cantonese Yale: pùhn tòuh) are consumed by the immortals due to their mystic virtue of conferring longevity on all who eat them. Peaches symbolizing immortality (or the wish for a long and healthy life) are a common symbol in Chinese art, appearing in depictions or descriptions in a number of fables, paintings, and other forms of art, often in association with thematically similar iconography, such as certain deities or immortals or other symbols of longevity, such as deer or cranes.

== Peach banquets ==
The Jade Emperor and his wife Xi Wangmu (Queen Mother of the West) ensured the deities' everlasting existence by feasting them with the peaches of immortality from the Peach Garden of Immortality. The immortals residing in the palace of Xi Wangmu were said to celebrate an extravagant banquet called the "Feast of Peaches" (Chinese: 蟠桃會; pinyin: Pántáo Huì; Cantonese Yale: pùhn tòuh wúih or Chinese: 蟠桃勝會; pinyin: Pántáo Shènghuì; Cantonese Yale: pùhn tòuh sing wúih), celebrated on earth in honor of Xi Wangmu's birthday on the third day of the third lunar month. The immortals wait six thousand years before gathering for this magnificent feast; the peach tree put forth leaves once every thousand years and required another three thousand years for the fruit to ripen. Statues depicting Xi Wangmu's attendants often held three peaches, and the Eight Immortals crossing the seas to attend the banquet is a popular subject in paintings.

Both the Former Affairs of the Emperor Wu and Records of Diverse Matters record stories where the Queen Mother of the West visited Emperor Wu of Han and offered peaches to him. In the latter account, when the Emperor says he plans to plant the peach stones, the Queen Mother of the West tells him that the trees will bear fruit once every 3,000 years.

== Journey to the West ==
The Peaches of Immortality are a major item featured within the popular fantasy novel Journey to the West. The peaches are first encountered when, in heaven, Sun Wukong is stationed as the Protector of the Peaches. The peach garden include three types of peaches, all of which grant over 3,000 years of life if only one is consumed. The first type blooms every three thousand years; anyone who eats it will become immortal, and their body will become both light and strong. The second type blooms every six thousand years; anyone who eats it will be able to fly and enjoy eternal youth. The third type blooms every nine thousand years; anyone who eats it will become "eternal as heaven and earth, as long-lived as the sun and moon." As the Protector, Sun realizes the effects of the sacred peaches and acts quickly as to consume one, before he runs into trouble when Xi Wangmu arrives to hold a peach banquet for many members of Heaven. Sun Wukong makes himself very small to hide within a peach during the banquet, before consuming more, thus gaining immortality and the abilities that come with the peaches.

Later on, Sun Wukong has a second chance to eat a fruit of immortality. A 1,000-foot-tall (300 m) tree grows behind a monastery run by a Taoist master and his disciples, though the master is away. Once every 10,000 years, the tree bears 30 of the legendary Man-fruit, which are just like newborn babies, complete with sense organs. The man-fruits grant 360 years of life to one who merely smells them and 47,000 years of life to one who consumes them. Fruits of immortality are not seen again after this point in the novel.

== Others ==
In Hanwu Gushi (Tales of Emperor Wu of Han), the Queen Mother also gifted seven peaches to Emperor Wu of Han, saying that the peaches bloom and bear fruit only once every 3,000 years.

Members of the Eight Immortals and the Old Man of the South Pole (a longevity deity) are sometimes depicted carrying a Peach of Immortality.

Because of the stories and the peach's association with long-life, peach is a common decoration (the fruit or an image thereof) on traditional birthday cakes and pastries in China.

== Gallery ==
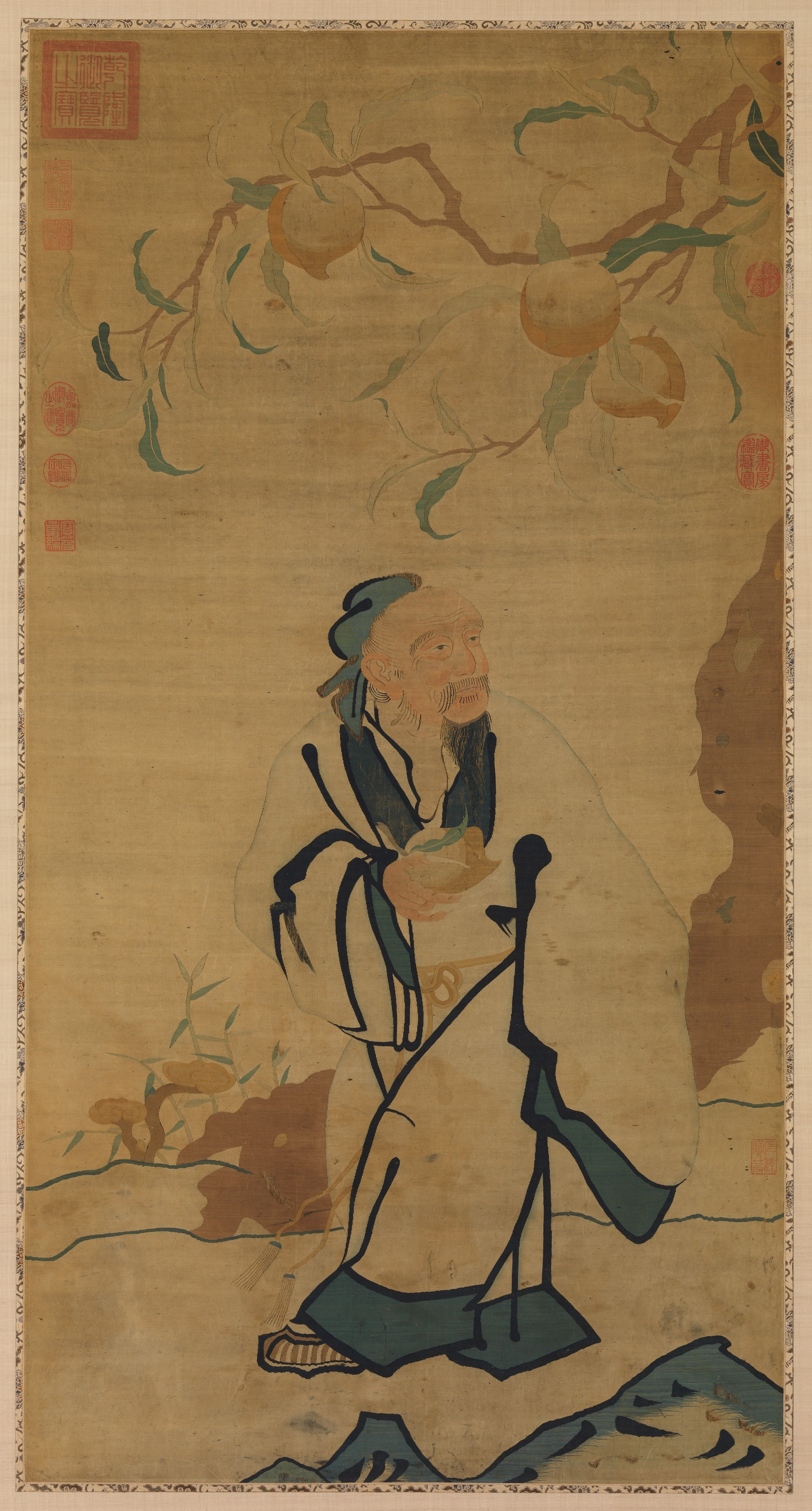
Silk tapestry of Dongfang Shuo stealing a peach of immortality, Ming dynasty (Metropolitan Museum of Art)

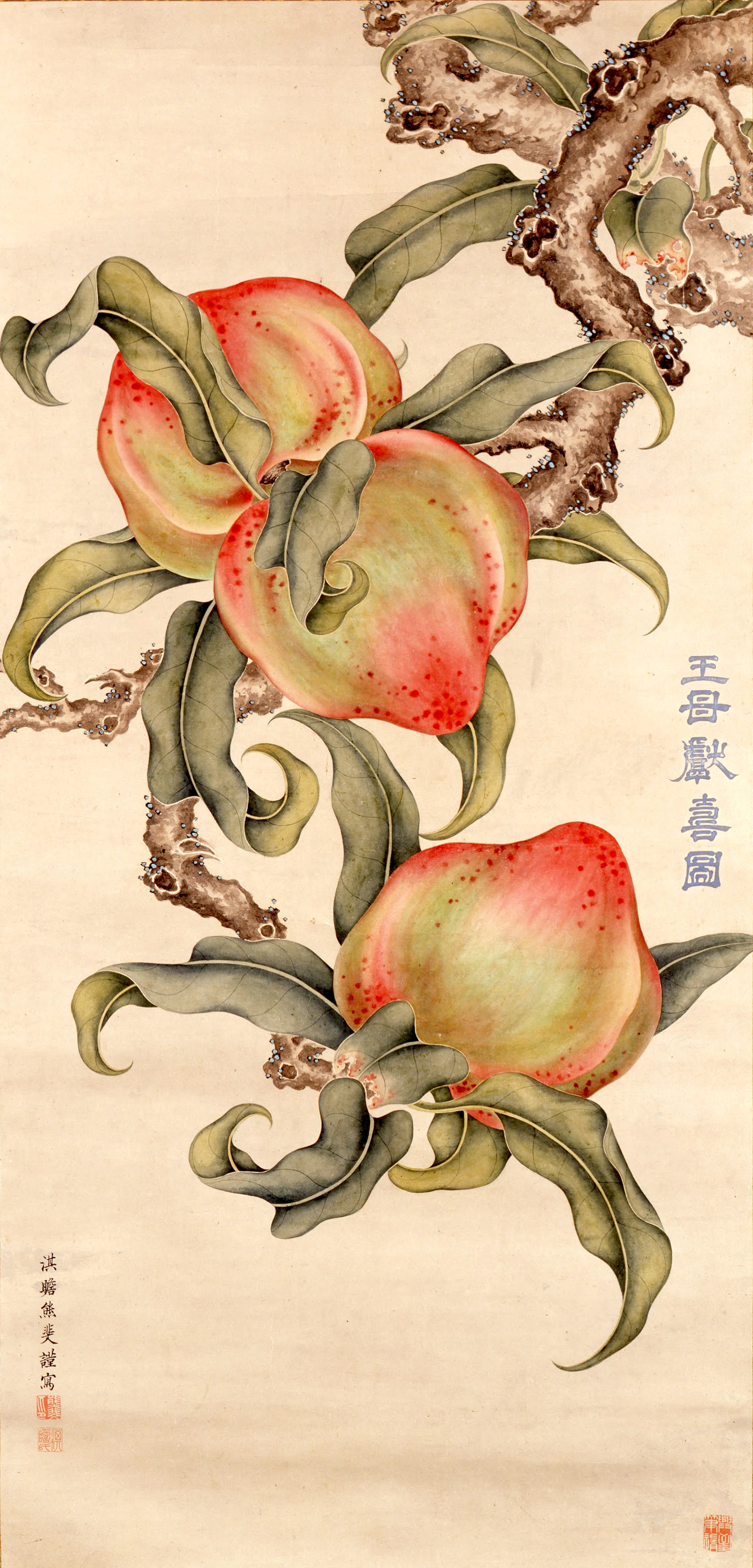
Xiwangmu's Peaches of Immortality, Japanese painting by Kumashiro Yūhi, c. 1750

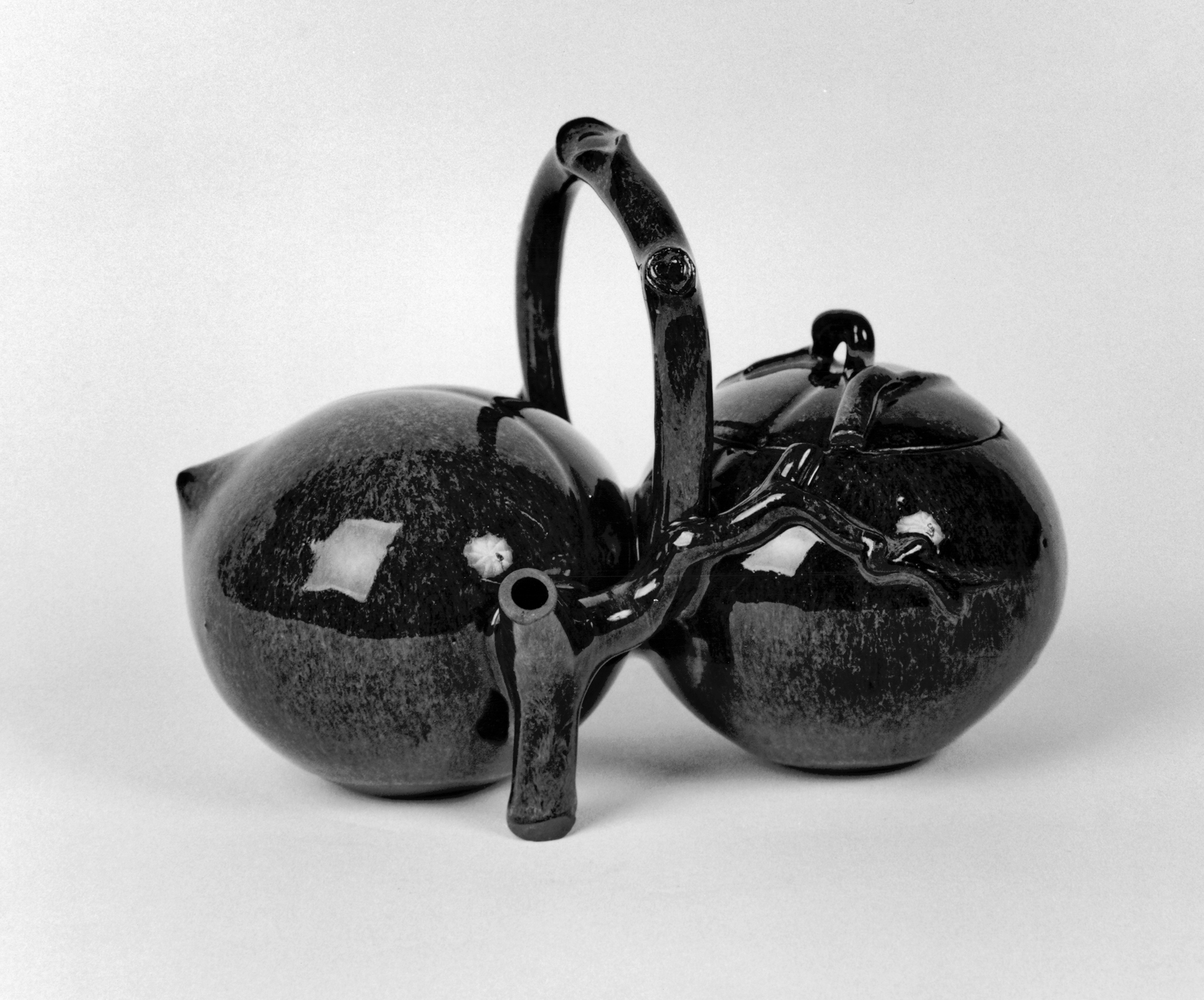
Chinese - Ceramic teapot in the form of two peaches - a symbol of immortality (or a wish for long life). Yixing-ware, with blue-brown glazing

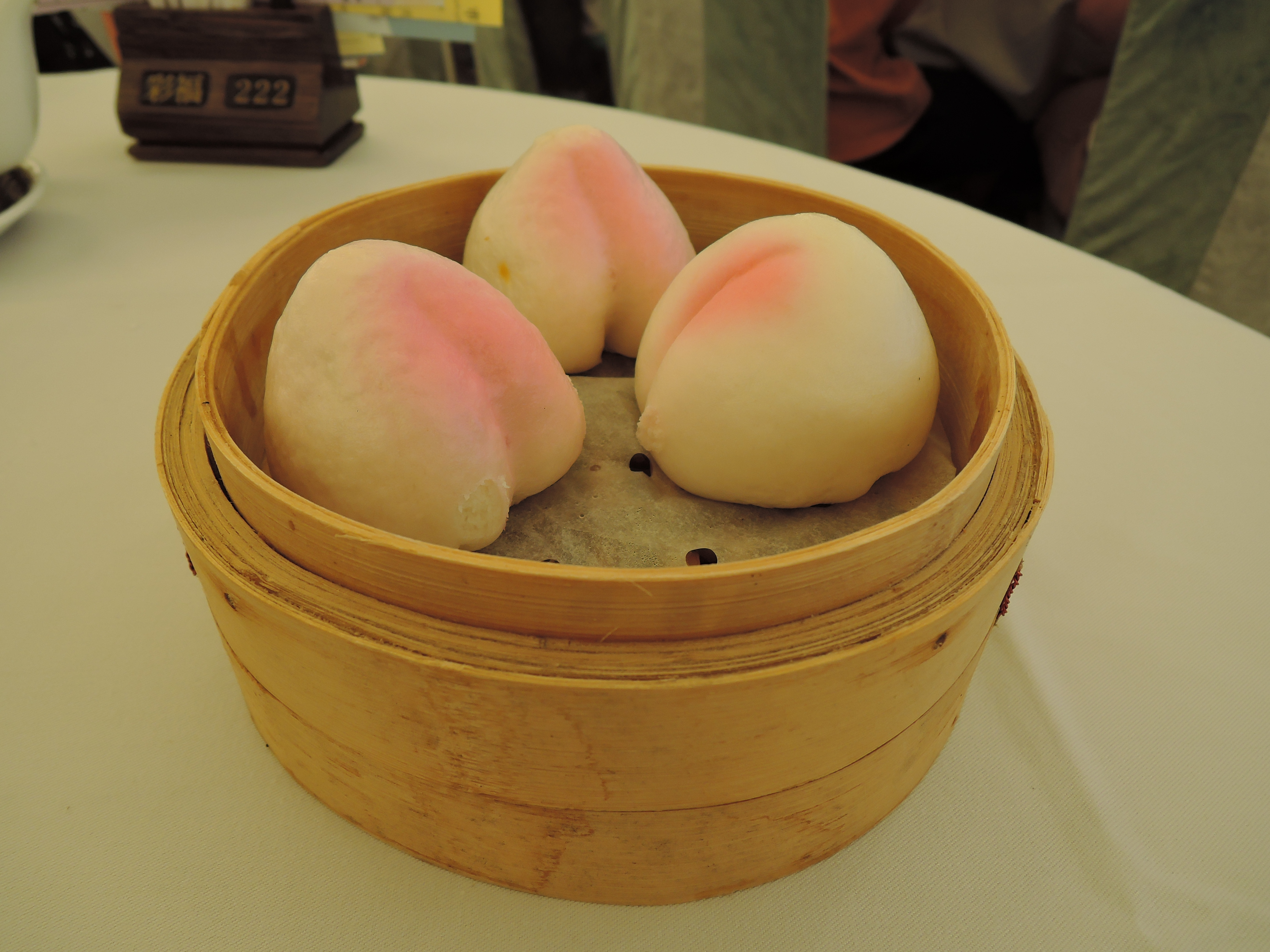
Shoutao is a type of bun mimicking the shape of a peach.

== See also ==
- Amrit, Hindu nectar/elixir of immortality
- Ambrosia, Greek food of immortality
- Golden apple, Norse food of immortality
- Kunlun Mountain (mythology), the mythological residence of Xi Wangmu; not originally identical with the modern "Mount Kunlun"
- Longevity peach, a pastry representation of Peaches of Immortality
- "The Peach Blossom Spring", a fable of utopia
- Trees in Chinese mythology
