= Marebito =

Japanese supernatural being

Marebito (Japanese: 稀人 or 客人, まれびと) represents a supernatural or divine being that visits from the underworld (他界; takai) at specific times. This belief, rooted in the welcoming of outsiders as gods from another world, has been an important part of Japanese folklore and customs throughout history. Marebito has been observed in various forms, from gods visiting during festivals to wandering ascetics and itinerant performers being treated as divine beings. Comparative studies have been conducted on the "sacred visitor" among Germanic peoples and Celts, highlighting the cultural significance and universality of the similar beliefs.

Marebito is an ancient Japanese word referring to a being who comes from afar bringing gifts of wisdom, spiritual knowledge and happiness. The word mare means "rare," while bito means a "person". The term refers to any one of a number of divine beings who were believed to visit villages in Japan, either from beyond the horizon or from beyond distant mountain ranges, bringing gifts. Villagers usually welcomed a marebito with rituals or festivals.

The 20th-century folklorist Shinobu Orikuchi, student of the great Japanese mythology scholar Kunio Yanagita, was the first to bring the ancient concept of marebito to the attention of modern scholars. Marebito one of two key elements of 'Orikuchi studies', a small academic school of thought in Japan based around that scholar. The other element is yorishiro, and both concepts are highly valued in folklore studies as clues to explore the faith and concepts of the afterlife among the Japanese people. It has been widely assumed that the 'marebito tradition died out long ago. However, remnants can still be found in some areas of Japan, such as Akita Prefecture, where the Namahage tradition is maintained. An alternative pronunciation is maroudo.

== Overview ==
The custom of providing accommodation and meals to visitors from outside (outsiders, marebito) is common globally. While economic reasons play a role, it is said that the "marebito belief," which regards strangers as gods from another world, lies at the root of this custom.

The term "marebito" was introduced by the folklorist Orikuchi Shinobu in 1929. He interpreted the term "guest" as "marebito" and inferred from existing folk traditions and descriptions in chronicles and myths that it originally meant the same thing as "god," and that the guest-gods would visit from the otherworld Tokoyo no kuni. Orikuchi gathered this information from the Kojiki and Nihon Shoki, mixes of myth and history from Japan's early history. Orikuchi's marebito theory was finalized in "The Origin of National Literature: Third Draft" (included in "Ancient Studies"). According to this paper, field research in Okinawa Prefecture seems to have been the inspiration for the concept of marebito.

Tokoyo is considered a land inhabited by shiryō (souls of the dead), and it was believed that ancestors lived there who protect people from evil spirits (including demons). Rural residents came to believe that every year, ancestral spirits would come from Tokoyo to bless them. Since their visits were rare, they came to be called "marebito." It is speculated that the Buddhist Obon festival is deeply related to this marebito belief.

Marebito gods were welcomed at festivals, but eventually, travelers visiting from outside the community also came to be treated as "marebito." In the Man'yoshu and Hitachi no Kuni Fudoki, it is recorded that on festival nights, the roles of gods coming from the outside were played by masked young villagers or travelers. As time passed, even beggars (hokaibito) and itinerant performers were treated as "marebito," and the divine-level hospitality they received enabled the existence of wandering ascetics. This gave rise to a belief system that generated a type of narrative called kishu ryūritan of noble wanderers overcoming hardships and trials.

It was believed that visiting gods called marebito (also known as raihoshin) would descend upon the yorishiro, erected pillar-like objects set up during festivals to welcome the gods. Their origins were said to be beyond the sea, corresponding to Nirai Kanai in Ryukyuan religion, and later influenced by mountain worship, changing the myth to approach from mountains or the heavens (for example, the descend of Amaterasu's grandson from heaven, the tenson kōrin).

Austrian ethnologist Alexander Slawik learned of the existence of "marebito belief" in Japan through his friend Masao Oka and conducted comparative studies on the legends and customs of the "sacred visitor" among the Germanic and Celtic peoples.

== Pop culture ==
The video game Elden Ring features a race called the Numen, which is the race of the goddess Marika. In Japanese, the term for Numen is marebito.

== See also ==
- Cargo cult
- Namahage
- Ebisu (mythology)
- Ultraman
- Omotenashi
- Xenia (Greek)

== Bibliography ==
- Shikida, Asami (2009-09-01). "The Role of Outsiders in the Community Development Process". The Journal of International Media, Communication, and Tourism Studies (in Japanese). 9: 79–100.
- Minkan shinkō jiten. Tokutarō Sakurai, 桜井德太郎 (Shohan ed.). Tōkyō: Tōkyōdō Shuppan. 1980. ISBN 4-490-10137-6. OCLC 9992298.
