= Zhu Qingyu =

Chinese poet

- Traditional Chinese: 朱慶餘
- Simplified Chinese: 朱慶余
- Literal meaning: (courtesy name)
Transcriptions
Standard Mandarin
- Hanyu Pinyin: Zhū Qìngyú
- Wade–Giles: Chu^{2} Ch'ing^{4}-yü^{1}

Alternative Chinese name
- Traditional Chinese: 朱可久
- Simplified Chinese: 朱可久
- Literal meaning: (given name)
Transcriptions
Standard Mandarin
- Hanyu Pinyin: Zhū Kějiǔ
- Wade–Giles: Chu^{2} K'e^{3}chiu^{3}

Zhu Qingyu (c. 797?–?) was a Chinese poet of the middle Tang dynasty. His birth name was Zhu Kejiu; Qingyu was his courtesy name.

He received a Jinshi degree in the imperial examination in the mid-820s.

== Biography ==
Zhu Kejiu was probably born around 797. His courtesy name, by which he is commonly known, was Qingyu.

During the Baoli era (825–827, Traditional Chinese: 寶曆, Simplified Chinese: 宝历, pinyin: bǎolì) he passed the imperial examination, receiving his Jinshi degree.

His year of death is not known.

== Poetry ==
He had a close relationship with the poet Zhang Ji, who highly praised his poetry.

== Cited works ==
- "Zhu Qing-yu (Shu Keiyo in Japanese)". Britannica Kokusai Dai-Hyakkajiten (in Japanese). Encyclopædia Britannica, Inc. 2014. Archived from the original on 2016-11-06.
