= Omotenashi =

Japanese expression

Omotenashi (Japanese: おもてなし, 御持て成し) is a Japanese expression that roughly describes concepts of hospitality as well as mindfulness. The term developed particularly around the roles of the host at a Japanese tea ceremony.

The term gained increased awareness internationally through the 2020 Summer Olympics in Tokyo.

== See also ==
- Marebito
