= Zhao Mengjian =

Chinese painter and politician

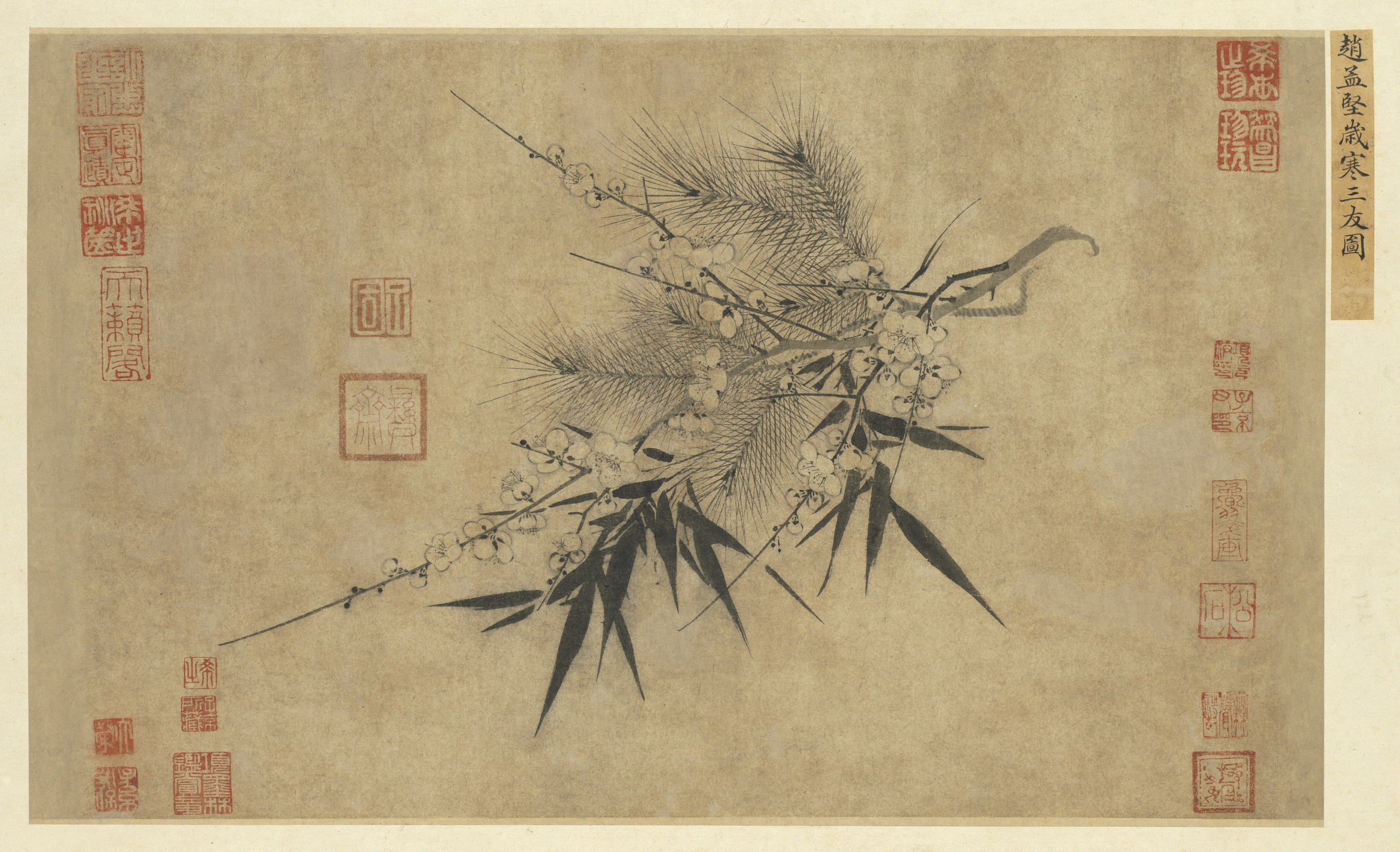
Zhao Mengjian: Three Friends of Winter

Zhao Mengjian (Chinese: 趙孟堅; Wade–Giles: Chao Meng-chien; 1199–1295), art name Yizhai (彝齋居士), was a Chinese painter and politician from Haiyan, Zhejiang.

He was a member of the Song dynasty who attained high rank at court as a Mandarin, and became president of the Hanlin Academy, retiring when the dynasty fell. He was known for his depictions of daffodils, plum blossom, orchids and bamboo.

== Bibliography ==
- Dictionnaire Bénézit (1999), Dictionnaire des peintres, sculpteurs, dessinateurs et graveurs (in French), vol. 14 (éditions Gründ ed.), 884, ISBN 2700030249.
- Yang Xin; Barnhart, Richard M.; Nie Chongzheng; Cahill, James; Lang Shaojun; Wu Hung (1997), Three thousand years of Chinese painting, New Haven: Yale, 140, 141, 144, ISBN 0300070136
- Hearn, Maxwell K. (2008). "Zhao Mengjian". How to read Chinese paintings. New York: Metropolitan Museum of Art. p. 70. ISBN 1588392813.
