= Southern School =

School of Chinese painting

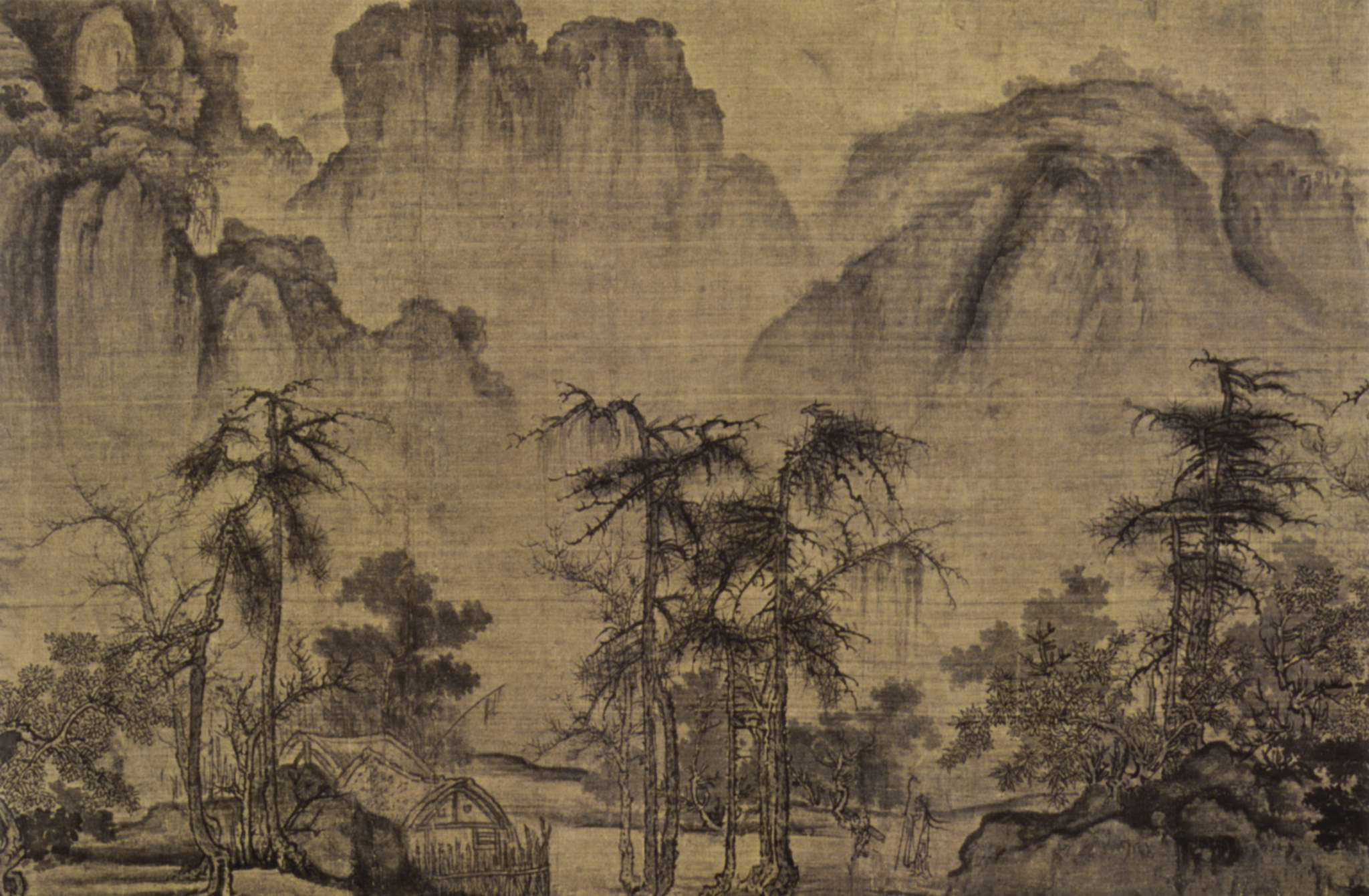
Kuo Hsi, Clearing Autumn Skies over Mountains and Valleys, Northern Song Dynasty c. 1070, detail from a horizontal scroll.

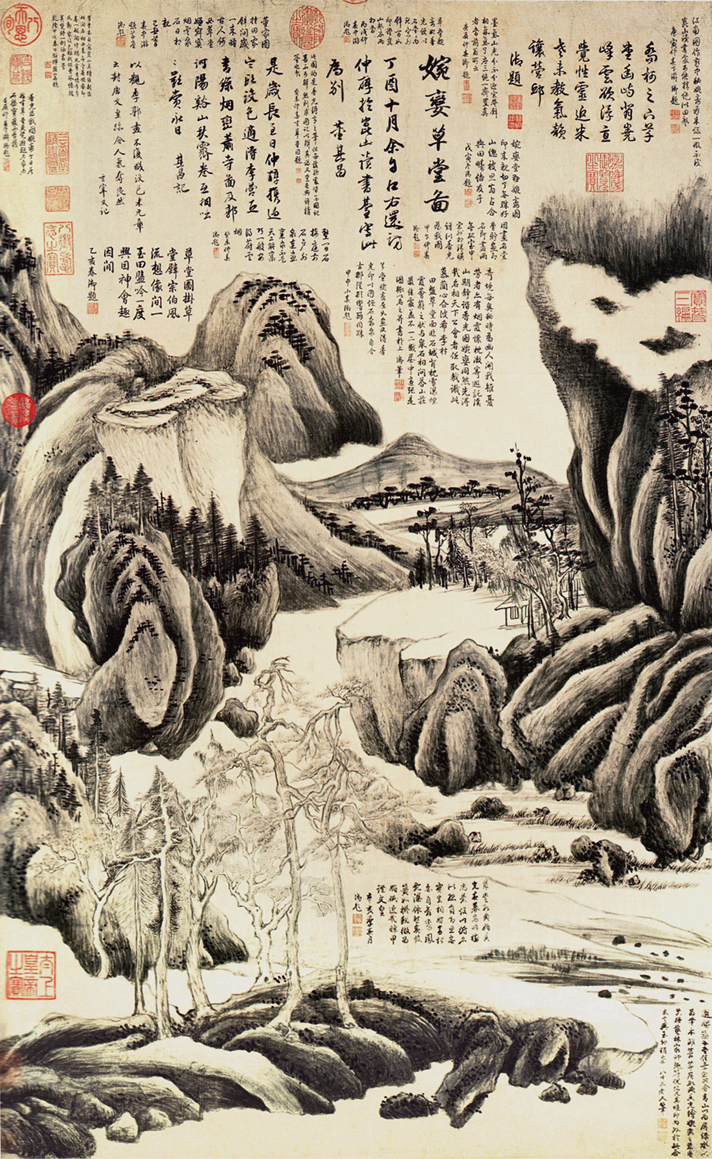
Dramatic landscape by the late Ming painter Dong Qichang, who invented the term, with the seals and poems of appreciation of later collectors

The Southern School (Chinese: 南宗画; pinyin: nán zōng huà) of Chinese painting, often called literati painting (文人画; wén rén huà), is a term used to denote art and artists which stand in opposition to the formal Northern School (北宗画; běi zōng huà) of painting. The distinction is not geographic, but relates to the style and contents of the works, and to some extent to the position of the artist. Typically, where professional, formal painters were classified as Northern School, scholar-bureaucrats who had either retired from the professional world or who were never a part of it constituted the Southern School.

According to William Watson, while the Northern School contains "the painters who favour clear, emphatic structure in their compositions, with the use of explicit perspective devices", the Southern School "cultivate a more intimate style of landscape bathed in cloud and mist, in which pleasing calligraphic forms tend to take the place of conventions established for the representation of rocks, trees, etc. The painter of the Southern School was interested in distant effects, but his colleague of the Northern School paid more attention to the devices of composition which achieve the illusion of recession, and at the same time more attentive to close realism of detail. ... some artists hover between the two". A more philosophical distinction is that the Southern School painters "were thought to have sought the inner realities and expressed their own lofty natures" while the Northern "painted only the outward appearance of things, the worldly and decorative".

Never a formal school of art in the sense of artists training under a single master in a single studio, the Southern School is more of an umbrella term spanning a great breadth across both geography and chronology. The literati lifestyle and attitude, and the associated style of painting, can be said to go back quite far to early periods of Chinese history. However, classification of the "Southern School" as such, that is, the coining of the term, is said to have been made by the scholar-artist Dong Qichang (1555–1636), who borrowed the concept from Chan (Zen) Buddhism, which also has Northern and Southern Schools.

== Style and subjects ==
Generally, Southern School painters worked in ink wash painting with black ink, and focused on expressive brushstrokes and a somewhat more impressionistic approach than the Northern School's formal attention to detail and use of color and highly refined traditional modes and methods. The stereotypical literati painter lived in retirement in the mountains or other rural areas, not entirely isolated, but immersed in natural beauty and far from mundane concerns. They were also lovers of culture, hypothetically enjoying and taking part in all Four Arts of the Chinese Scholar as touted by Confucianism, that is, painting, calligraphy, music, and games of skill and strategy. They would often combine these elements into their work, and would gather with one another to share their interests.

Literati paintings are most commonly of landscapes often of the shanshui (Chinese: 山水; pinyin: shān shuǐ; lit. 'mountain-water') genre, and feature scholars in retirement, or travellers, admiring and enjoying the scenery, or immersed in culture. Figures are often depicted carrying or playing guqin (zithers), and residing in quite isolated mountain hermitages. Calligraphic inscriptions, either of classical poems or ones composed by a contemporary literati (the painter, or a friend), are also quite common. However, while this sort of landscape, with certain features and elements, is the standard stereotypical Southern School painting, the genre actually varied quite widely, as the literati painters themselves, in rejecting the formal strictures of the Northern School, sought the freedom to experiment with subjects and styles.

== History ==
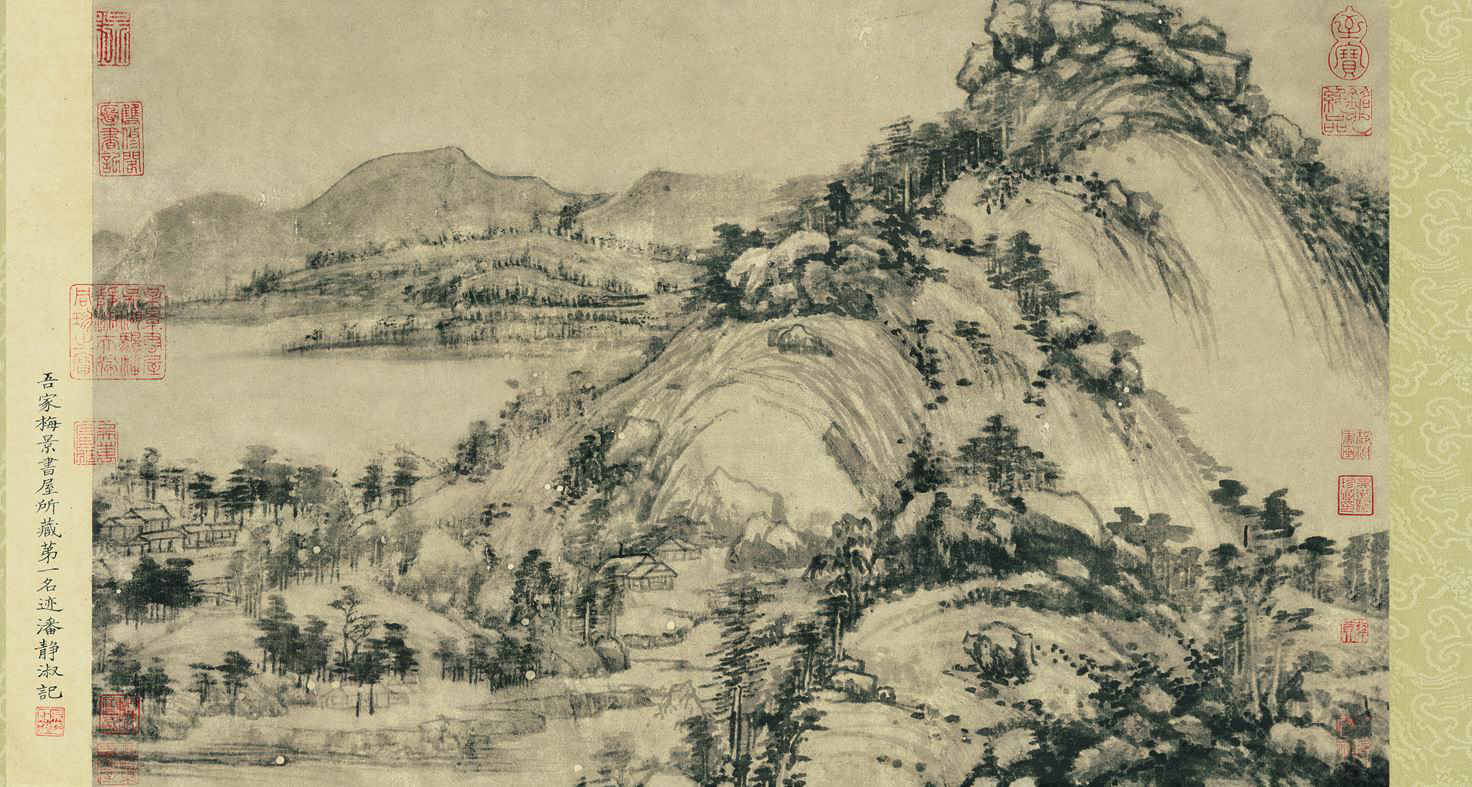
Portion of Dwelling in the Fuchun Mountains, a scroll by Huang Gongwang, one of the Four Masters of the Yuan Dynasty, c. 1350

Although the term itself originates much later, the artists later attached to it go back to at least the Tang dynasty, with a larger group from (rather confusingly) the Northern Song dynasty. In the latter period the tradition of literati landscape painting seems to have acquired most of the characteristics that it kept throughout its history, and a number of writings on theory have survived from it; the extent to which actual works by Tang or Song masters have survived is still a matter of controversy. Several of the famous names from the periods between the Tang and Song periods were very high officials, but in later periods landscape painting became a refuge and form of muted protest within their class for officials out of favour, or who opposed and avoided the court. During the Qing period (1644–1911), the canons of classical Chinese painting mainly derived from the criteria set out by Dong Qichang, Mo Shilong (1537?–1587), and Chen Jiru (1558–1639). They identified two different schools: the “Northern School of Painting” and the “Southern School of Painting”, also called “Literati Painting”. They were inspired by two schools formed by the schism of Chan Buddhism during the Tang Dynasty: the Northern Chan school and the Southern Chan school.

Like other traditions in Chinese art, the early Southern style soon acquired a classic status and was much copied and imitated, with later painters sometimes producing sets of paintings each in the style of a different classic artist. Though greatly affected by the confrontation with Western painting from the 18th-century on, the style continued to be practiced until at least the 20th century.

== Influence in Japan ==
Beginning in the 18th century, the attitudes of the Chinese literati (the scholar-bureaucrat in retirement who devotes himself entirely to a love of culture) began to be taken up by Japanese artists. As the Japanese literati (文人, C: wen ren, J: bun jin) were forbidden to leave Japan, and had little access to original Chinese works (or to meeting the literati themselves), the lifestyle, attitude, and art changed considerably in Japan. Outside of native Japanese inspirations, these bunjin gained Chinese influence only through woodblock-printed art books which attempted to reproduce and communicate the Southern School ideals and methods. The Southern School (南宗画, C: nan zhong hua, J: nan shū ga) came to be known as nanga in Japan. Japanese literati painters had a huge variety of social backgrounds (feudal lords and their retainers, samurai, merchants, and even fishermen), although they emulated the Chinese literati lifestyle. Ike no Taiga's style was directly inspired by the Southern School of Chinese painting.

== Literati ==
The scholars, scholarly civil servants, or literati of Imperial China, were all schooled in Confucianism known as the School of Literati. In early China the term refers to the class of people that went through traditional Chinese education. There were sets of Chinese civil service examinations, including Chinese literature and philosophy. Passing the exam was a requirement for many government positions. These individuals were the mandarins, and referred to those who held government positions.

== Selected artists of note ==
- Wang Wei (王維 699–759)
- Dong Yuan (董源, mid 10th century)
- Huang Gongwang (黄公望, 1269–1354)
- Ni Zan (倪贊, 1301–74)
- Wu Zhen (呉鎮, 1280–1354)
- Wang Meng (王蒙, 1308–85)
- Shen Zhou (沈周, 1427–1509)
- Wen Zhengming (文徵明, 1470–1559)

== See also ==
- Chinese painting
- Wu School – a group within the Southern School
- Zhe School – a group within the Northern School
- Nanga (Japanese painting)
