= Wuchang (disambiguation) =

Wuchang District (武昌区) is a former city, now a central district of Wuhan, Hubei, China.

Wuchang may also refer to:

- Uddiyana also Wuchang (烏萇國), an ancient kingdom of medieval India mentioned in Buddhist texts
- Wuchang, Heilongjiang (五常市), a county-level city in Heilongjiang, China
- Wuchang, Sichuan (吴场镇), a town in Jiajiang County, Sichuan, China
- Wuchang Subdistrict (五常街道), a subdistrict in Yuhang District, Hangzhou, Zhejiang, China
- Heibai Wuchang (黑白无常), or Black and White Wuchang, deity pair in Chinese folk religion
- Five Constants – Cardinal ethical principles in Confucianism. Also called Wuchang (五常).
- Ezhou, once known as Wuchang County
- Wuchang: Fallen Feathers, a 2025 video game

== See also ==
- Wuchang station (disambiguation)
- Wucheng (disambiguation)
