= Wang Meng (painter) =

Chinese painter (1308–1385)

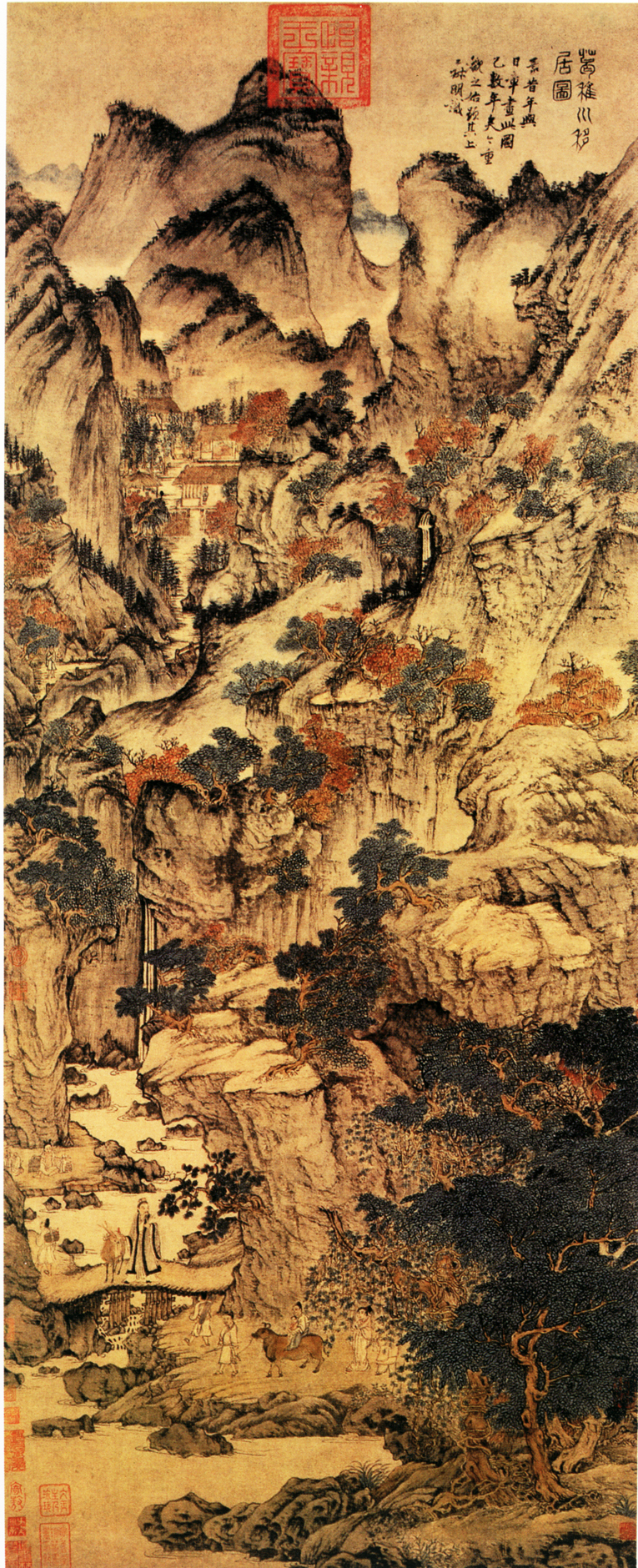
Wang Meng, Ge Zhichuan Relocating (葛稚川移居图), Palace Museum, Beijing

Wang Meng (王蒙, Wáng Méng; Zi: Shūmíng 叔明, Hao: Xiāngguāng Jūshì 香光居士) (c. 1308 – 1385) was a Chinese painter during the Yuan dynasty.

== Biography ==
Wang Meng was born in Wuxing (吴兴), now known as Huzhou (湖州), Zhejiang. He was a maternal grandson of Zhao Mengfu, thus making him a descendant of the Song dynasty's royal bloodline on his mother's side.

Wang Meng was erroneously accused of conspiring against the Ming Emperor Taizu and spent the last five years of his life in jail.

== Painting style ==
Wang Meng is considered to be one of the Four Masters of the Yuan dynasty, along with Huang Gongwang, Wu Zhen, and Ni Zan. They famously refused to serve the Mongolian rulers of their country. In contrast to many renowned painters in previous history, these artists mostly worked on paper instead of silk, an indication of the importance they gave to the calligraphic touch of the brush on paper. They exclusively painted landscapes, which they believed to be the visible key to the invisible reality. They restricted their acquaintanceship to each other, and like-minded "wen ren" (gentleman-scholars).

Wang Meng was the youngest of the group, and the least famous in his own time. Nevertheless, his style greatly influenced later Chinese painting. In contrast to the relatively spare style of his compatriots, his ropy brushstrokes piled one on the other to produce masses of texture combined in dense and involved patterns. Many artists were influenced by the works of Wang Meng centuries after his death, most notably Dong Qichang.

His most famous works are the Ge Zhichuan Relocating, Forest Grotto at Juqu, Writing Books under the Pine Trees, The Simple Retreat, and Dwelling in the Qingbian Mountains. Most of his masterpieces are now located in notable museums around the world, such as the Palace Museum, National Palace Museum, Shanghai Museum, Cleveland Museum of Art and the Metropolitan Museum of Art. In 2011, a lesser known work of his from a private collection, titled Zhichuan Resettlement, was sold for 402.5 million yuan (US$62.1 million) at art auction.

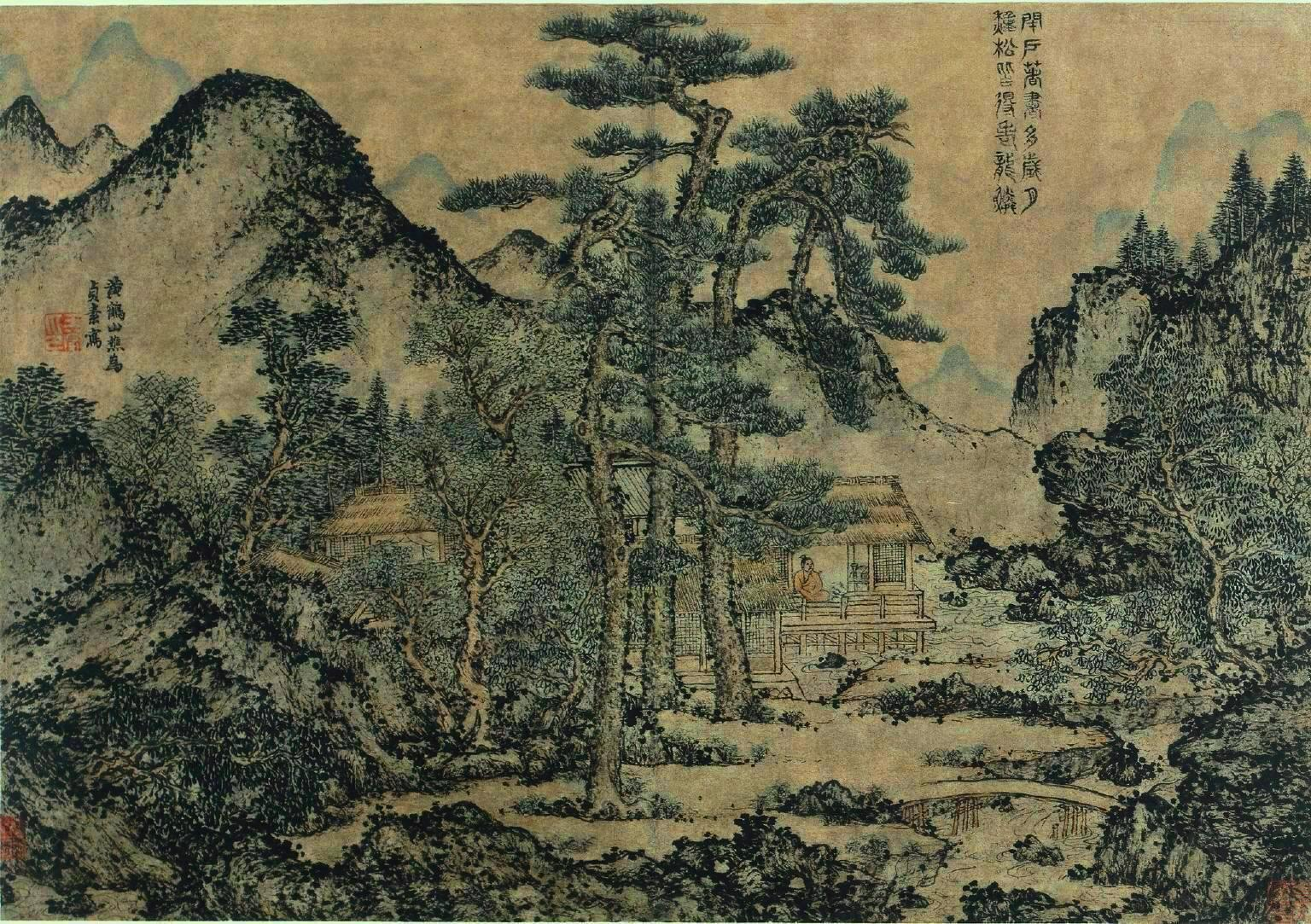
Writing Books under the Pine Trees, Cleveland Museum of Art

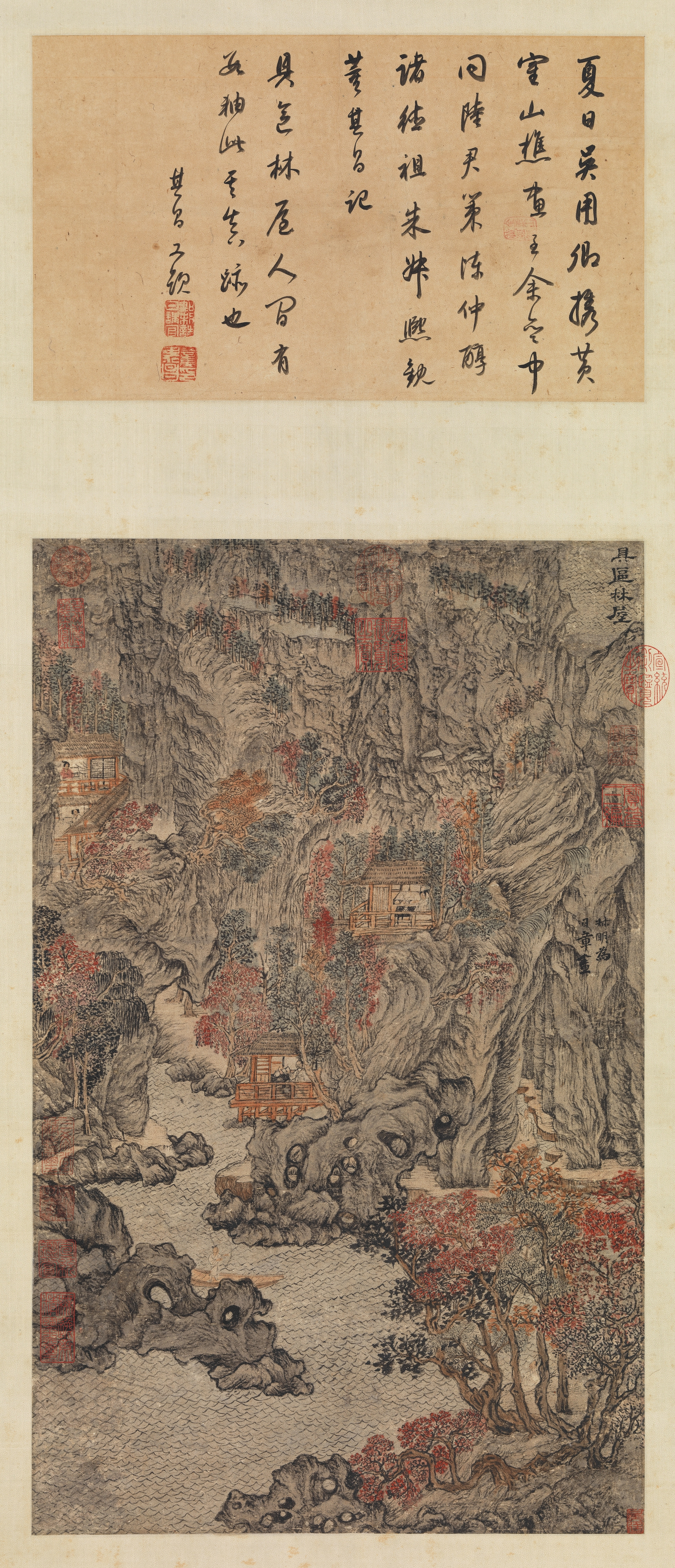
Forest Grotto in Juqu, National Palace Museum

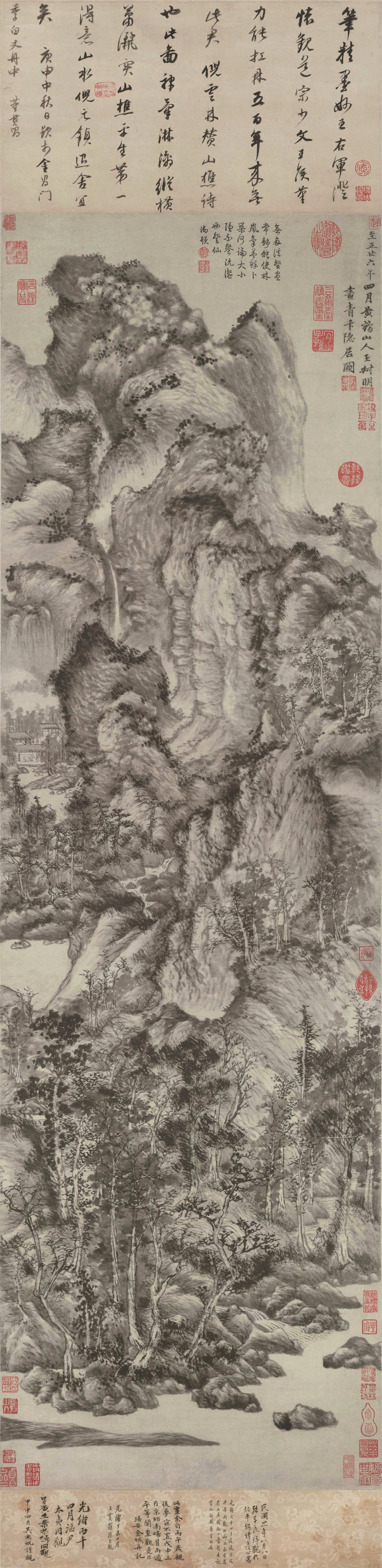
Dwelling in the Qingbian Mountains, Shanghai Museum

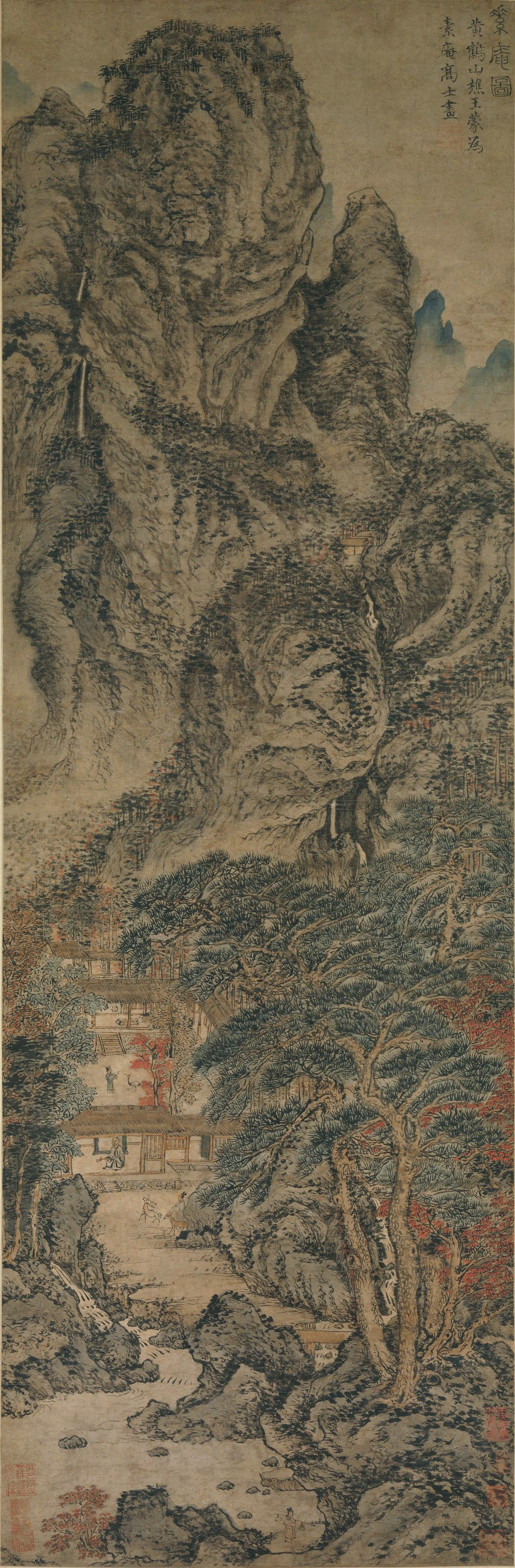
The Simple Retreat, Metropolitan Museum of Art
