= Wuchang station =

Wuchang station may refer to:

- Wuchang railway station, a major railway station in Wuhan, China
- Wuchang railway station (Heilongjiang), a railway station in Heilongjiang, China
- Wuchang railway station (Sichuan), a railway station in Sichuan, China
- Wuchang station (Hangzhou Metro), a metro station in Hangzhou, China

== See also ==
- Kaisyuan Wuchang light rail station, a light rail station on Circular light rail line in Kaohsiung, Taiwan
