= Wu Cheng =

Wu Cheng or Wucheng may refer to:

== People ==
- Emperor Wucheng of Northern Qi (537–569), emperor of the Northern Qi dynasty
- Wu Cheng (Wuyue) (893–965), chancellor of the Wuyue Kingdom
- Wu Cheng (philosopher) (1249–1333), philosopher during the Song and Yuan dynasties
- Wu Cheng, one of the fictional bearers of the mantle of the White Dragon in DC Comics

== Places in China ==
- Wucheng County, a county in Shandong
- Wucheng County (烏程縣), a former county now known as Huzhou, Zhejiang
- Wucheng District, a district in Jinhua, Zhejiang
- Wucheng Township, Zhangshu, a township in Zhangshu, Jiangxi
  - Wucheng culture, Bronze Age culture in Wucheng Township, Zhangshu
- Wucheng Township, Shanxi (吴城乡), a township in Hunyuan County, Shanxi
- Wucheng Subdistrict (坞城街道), a subdistrict in Xiaodian District, Taiyuan, Shanxi

=== Towns ===
- Wucheng, Wuwei County (无城), in Wuwei County, Anhui
- Wucheng, Xiuning County (五城), in Xiuning County, Anhui
- Wucheng, Tongbai County (吴城), in Tongbai County, Henan
- Wucheng, Wuyang County (吴城), in Wuyang County, Henan
- Wucheng, Jiangsu (吴城), in Huai'an, Jiangsu
- Wucheng, Yongxiu County (吴城), in Yongxiu County, Jiangxi
- Wucheng, Wucheng County (武城), seat of Wucheng County, Shandong
- Wucheng, Xi County (午城), in Xi County, Shanxi
- Wucheng, Lüliang, in Lüliang, Shanxi

== Historical eras ==
- Wucheng (武成, 559–560), era name used by Emperor Ming of Northern Zhou
- Wucheng (武成, 784–786), era name used by Li Xilie
- Wucheng (武成, 908–910), era name used by Wang Jian

== See also ==
- Wu Chen (disambiguation)
- Wu Zheng (disambiguation)
- Wuchang (disambiguation)
