= Four Masters =

Four Masters may refer to:

- Annals of the Four Masters, a chronicle of medieval Irish history
- Four Masters GAA, a GAA club in County Donegal
- Four Masters of the Yuan Dynasty, four famous painters during the Yuan Dynasty era in China
- Four Masters of the Ming Dynasty, four famous painters during the Ming Dynasty era in China
