= Wu Chen =

Wu Chen may refer to:

== People with surname Wǔ 武 ==
- Wu Chen (general) (?–208 BCE, 武臣), rebel of Qin dynasty, prior to Chu–Han Contention

== People with surname Wú 吳 ==
- Wu Chen, Prince of Changsha (3rd century–193 BCE, 吳臣), vassal-prince of Changsha of Han dynasty, son of Wu Rui

== See also ==
- Wu Cheng (disambiguation)
- Wu Zhen (disambiguation)
