= Six Gentlemen =

Six Gentlemen may refer to:

- Six Gentlemen of the Song dynasty, a group of officials who were politically exiled for their views
- Six Gentlemen (painting), a 1345 landscape painting by Ni Zan
- Six gentlemen of the Hundred Days' Reform, a group of Qing dynasty Chinese intellectuals
