= Wu Zhen =

Wu Zhen is the name of:

- Wu Zhen (historian) (fl. 11th century), Song dynasty historian
- Wu Zhen (painter) (1280–1354), Yuan dynasty painter
- Wu Zhen (politician) (born 1958), Chinese politician

== See also ==
- Wuzhen, a historic scenic town in Tongxiang, Zhejiang, China
