= Six Gentlemen (painting) =

Painting by Ni Zan

- 六君子圖 (Chinese), 六君子图 (Chinese)
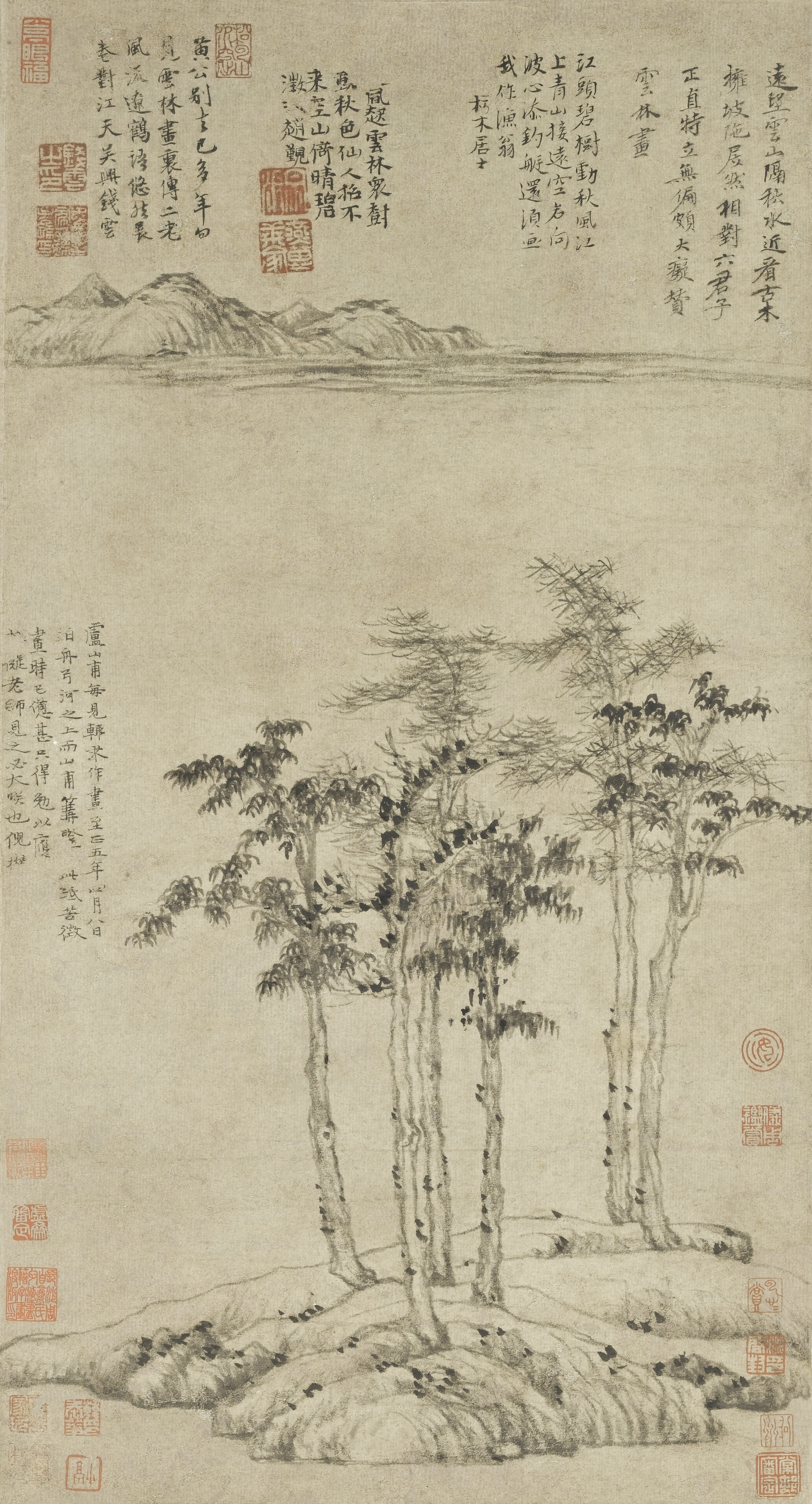
- Artist: Ni Zan
- Year: 1345
- Type: ink on paper, mounted on hanging scroll
- Dimensions: 61.9 cm × 33.3 cm (24.4 in × 13.1 in)
- Location: Shanghai Museum, Shanghai

Six Gentlemen is a landscape painting by the Yuan dynasty Chinese artist Ni Zan (1301–1374). The work portrays six trees along a riverbank, a metaphor for the principled seclusion of virtuous gentlemen in an era of violent upheaval and foreign occupation. As the first of Ni Zan’s paintings to demonstrate the stark, minimalist style for which he is known, Six Gentlemen marked a turning point in his artistic career. He would frequently return to its subject matter in later years, producing many subsequent works of nearly identical composition and style.

== Description ==
Ni Zan painted Six Gentlemen while visiting his friend, the art collector Lu Heng, in the spring of 1345. Ni’s inscription explains that he arrived by boat at Lu’s house on May 10, and that Lu immediately brought paper and asked him to paint something for him (a request he made whenever the two of them met). Though tired, Ni Zan obliged and produced the painting by the light of a lamp.

The result was a sparse landscape in which six old trees stand on a small bank in the lower foreground, across an expanse of water from some distant hills in the background. Ni Zan’s inscription suggests that “old master Dachi”, the respected elder artist Huang Gongwang, would laugh when he saw the painting. It is accompanied by a second inscription by Huang himself, who was also a guest at Lu Heng’s house at the time, and examined the painting soon after it was made. It is from Huang’s inscription that the painting receives its name, Six Gentlemen:

Distant cloudy mountains range across the autumn river;
Nearby, ancient trees huddle by the sloping shore.
Six gentlemen stand facing one another,
Upright, straight, outstanding, unbending.

Another inscription, possibly by a different guest at Lu Heng’s house, volunteers its author as a model if Ni Zan should ever decide to add a fisherman to his painting later. The final inscription, added after Huang’s death, remarks that he and Ni Zan will live on in the form of the painting.

== Analysis ==
The starkly barren landscape depicted in Six Gentlemen might represent Ni Zan's feelings about recent upheavals in the region around his home in Wuxi. The devastating Yellow River flood of the previous year displaced many people in the area, and gave rise to banditry and peasant rebellions.

The composition and brushwork of Six Gentlemen are simpler compared to Ni Zan’s earlier paintings, such as Enjoying the Wilderness in an Autumn Grove (1339) and Water and Bamboo Dwelling (1343), which had been influenced by the styles of Dong Yuan and Zhao Mengfu. Ni's later approach to landscape painting was expressed by his statement that "what I call painting is no more than free brushwork done sketchily" and that "I never seek representative likeness since I paint only for my own amusement". The austerity of Ni's brushwork is also thought to be connected to his reputed obsession with cleanliness and purity.

The visual isolation of the “six gentlemen” in the painting may reflect the attitude of intellectuals like Ni who preferred to live a life of seclusion in the countryside rather than serve as government officials under the Mongol-led Yuan dynasty, which had conquered the native Chinese Song dynasty. This theme is suggested by Huang’s inscription, which may be referring to the likeminded individuals gathered in Lu Heng’s house when Ni Zan painted Six Gentlemen, or to the “six gentlemen” of the Song dynasty, a group of officials who were purged from the government for their views. The importance of individual expression (both political and aesthetic), and the rejection of realistic detail, are major themes in late Yuan dynasty literati painting.

== Similar works ==
Six Gentlemen marks the genesis of Ni's personal style. His subsequent landscapes usually follow the same pattern: minimal compositions with a few trees, low mountains across a lake or river, occasionally an empty hut, and no human figures. Examples from Ni's later years include Empty Pavilion in a Pine Grove (1354), Wind among the Trees on the Riverbank (1363, painted after his wife's death), The Rongxi Studio (1372), and Woods and Valleys of Mount Yu (also 1372). This style was also frequently imitated by later artists, who took Ni and the other literati painters of the Yuan dynasty as archaic models to emulate.
