= Wu Zheng =

Wu Zheng may refer to:

- Bruno Wu (surname Wu, born 1966), Chinese entrepreneur
- Zheng Wu (surname Zheng, born 1967), Chinese basketball player
