= Wuchang railway station (Sichuan) =

Railway station in Sichuan, China

Wuchang 吴场

General information
- Location: Jiajiang County, Leshan, Sichuan; China
- Operator: China Railway Chengdu Group, China Railway Corporation
- Line: Chengdu–Kunming Railway

History
- Opened: 1965

Wuchang railway station (Chinese: 吴场站; pinyin: Wúchǎng Zhàn) is a railway station of Chengdu–Kunming Railway in Jiajiang County, Leshan, Sichuan, China.

== See also ==
- Chengdu–Kunming Railway
