= Ni Zan =

Chinese painter (1301–1374)

- Traditional Chinese: 倪瓚
- Simplified Chinese: 倪瓒
Transcriptions
Standard Mandarin
- Hanyu Pinyin: Ní Zàn
- Wade–Giles: Ni^{2} Tsan^{4}
- IPA: [nǐ tsân]
Yue: Cantonese
- Yale Romanization: Ngàih Jaan
Southern Min
- Tâi-lô: Gê Tsān

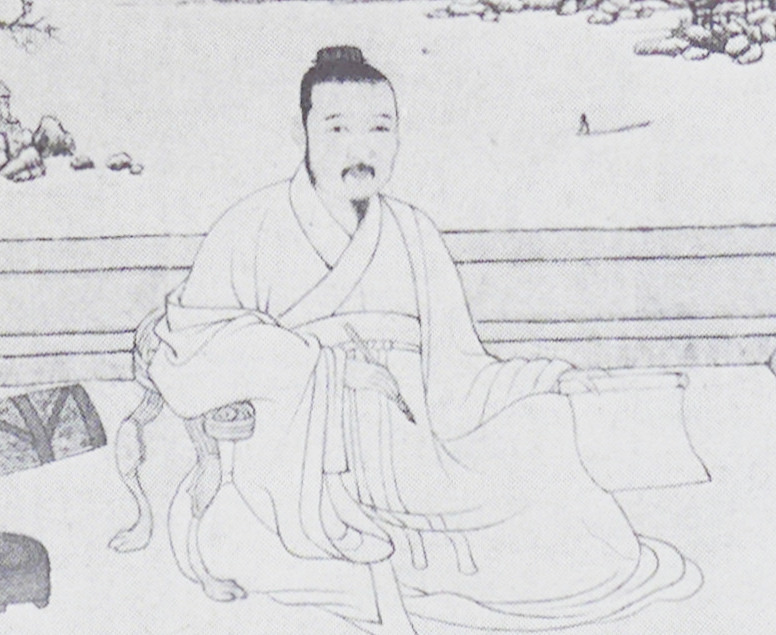
Portrait of Ni Zan

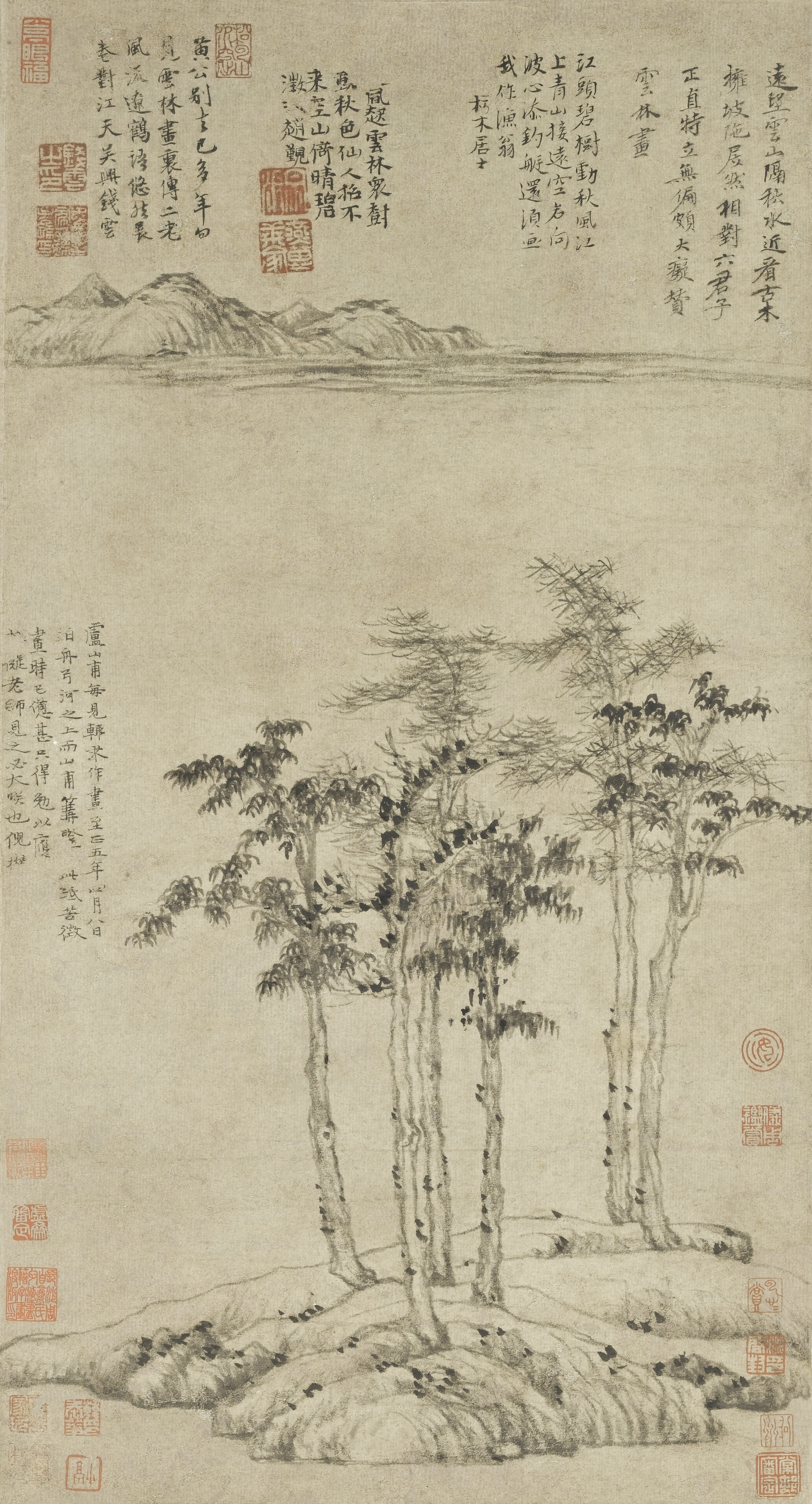
Six Gentlemen (1345), collection of the Shanghai Museum

Ni Zan (simplified Chinese: 倪瓒; traditional Chinese: 倪瓚; Wade–Giles: Ni^{2} Tsan^{4}; 1301–1374) was a Chinese painter during the Yuan and early Ming periods. Along with Huang Gongwang, Wu Zhen, and Wang Meng, he is considered to be one of the Four Masters of the Yuan dynasty.

== Life ==
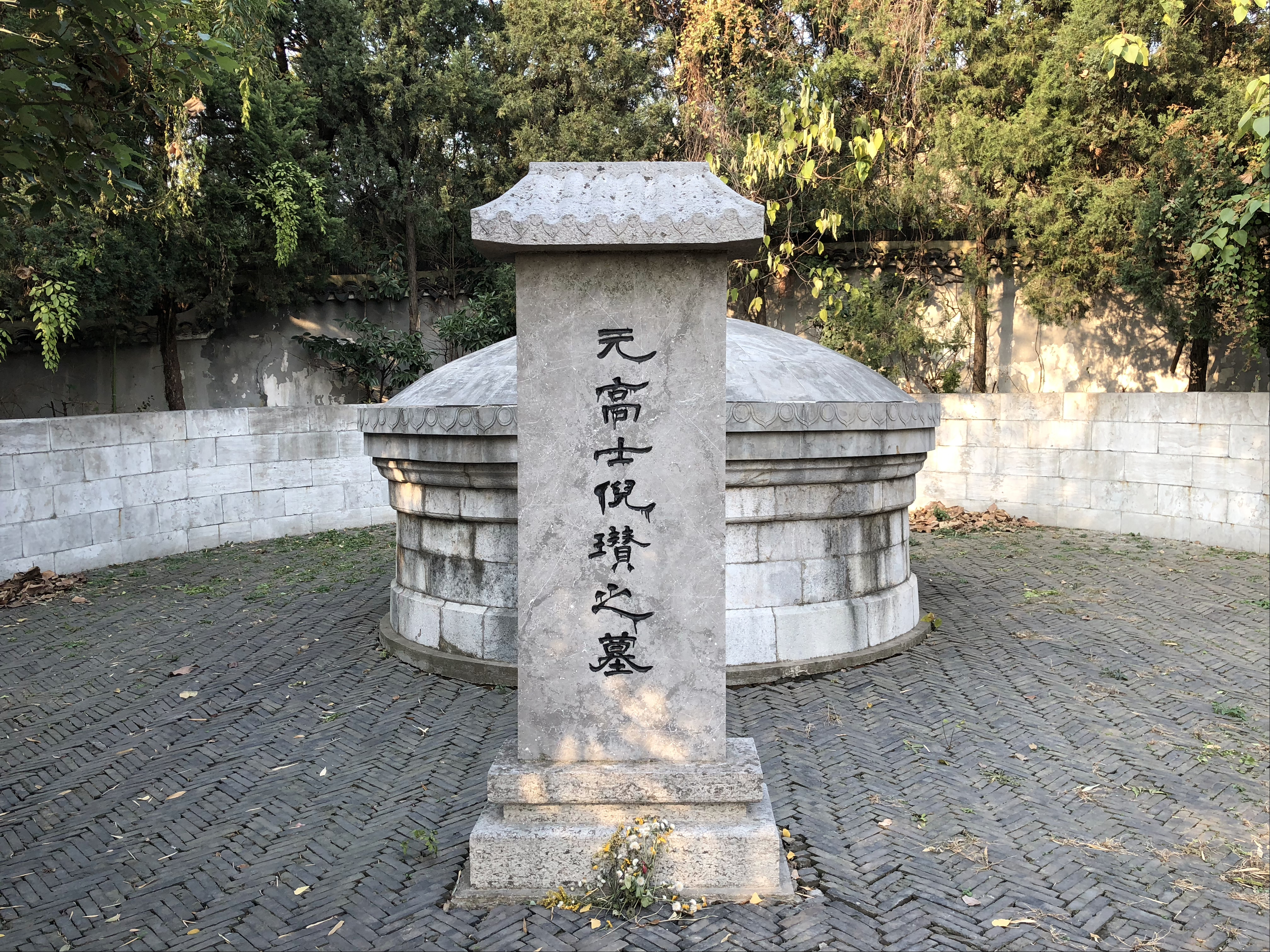
Tomb of Ni Zan

Ni Zan was born into a wealthy family in Wuxi. His courtesy name was Yuan Zhen (元鎮), and his art names were Yun Lin Zi (雲林子), Huan Xia Sheng (幻霞生), and Jing Man Min (荊蠻民). He was born after the death of the Kublai Khan, the Mongol ruler who defeated the Song and established dominance over all the areas that had traditionally been considered China. The Yuan rulers did not trust many of the Confucian scholars and instead preferred to appoint Mongolians and Muslims to administrative positions. Ni Zan was born into an elite family who could afford the cost of a rigorous Confucian education for him in spite of the unavailability of high-paying governmental jobs that traditionally were the reward for such an education. He was one of a number of wealthy scholars and poets who were part of a movement that radically altered traditional conceptions of Chinese painting. Their paintings depicted representations of natural settings that were highly localized, portraying personally valued vistas that reflected their individual feelings.

During the 1340s a number of droughts and floods caused a famine throughout Ni Zan's region, which subsequently led to peasant revolts. These revolts peaked in 1350 due to the government's use of forced labor to repair the dikes on the Yellow River. Throughout the 1340s, the Yuan rulers also imposed heavy taxes on the rich landowners of the region in order to cover the cost of the ongoing natural disasters. There are many divergent opinions concerning Ni Zan's reaction to these taxes, and his ensuing actions are unclear. However, it has been established that he distributed all of his possessions to his friends and moved into a houseboat. He left on the eve of the millenarianist Red Turban Revolt and travelled throughout the relatively peaceful southeast while various revolutionary parties tore through his region of origin. It was at this time that Ni Zan developed his distinctive style.

Ni Zan's landscapes after 1345 all take very much the same form: ink-monochrome paintings of widely separated riverbanks rendered in sketch brushwork and foreground trees silhouetted against the expanse of water. His sparse landscapes never represent people and defy many traditional concepts of Chinese painting. Many of his works hardly represent the natural settings they were intended to depict. Indeed, Ni Zan consciously used his art as a medium of self-expression. In 1364, he said "I use bamboo painting to write out the exhilaration in my breast, that is all. Why should I worry whether it shows likeness or not?"

Ni Zan travelled around southern China during the collapse of the Yuan Dynasty and spent his time painting. During his lifetime, his work was highly valued and in itself was enough to pay for the hospitality provided by his friends as he travelled. He returned to his hometown in 1371 after the establishment of the Ming Dynasty. In 1372, he painted his Rongxi Studio, which epitomizes his style.

== Paintings ==
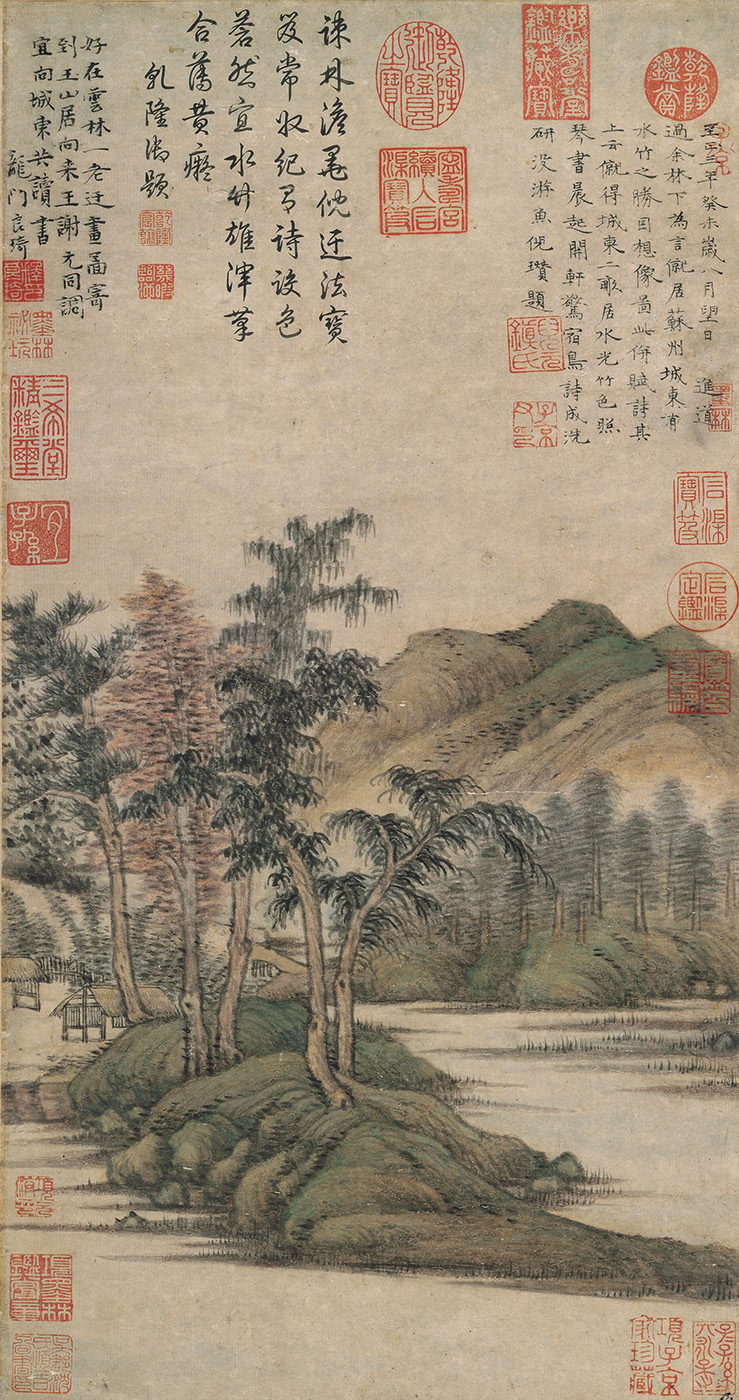
Ni Zan, Water and Bamboo Dwelling, collection of the National Museum of China

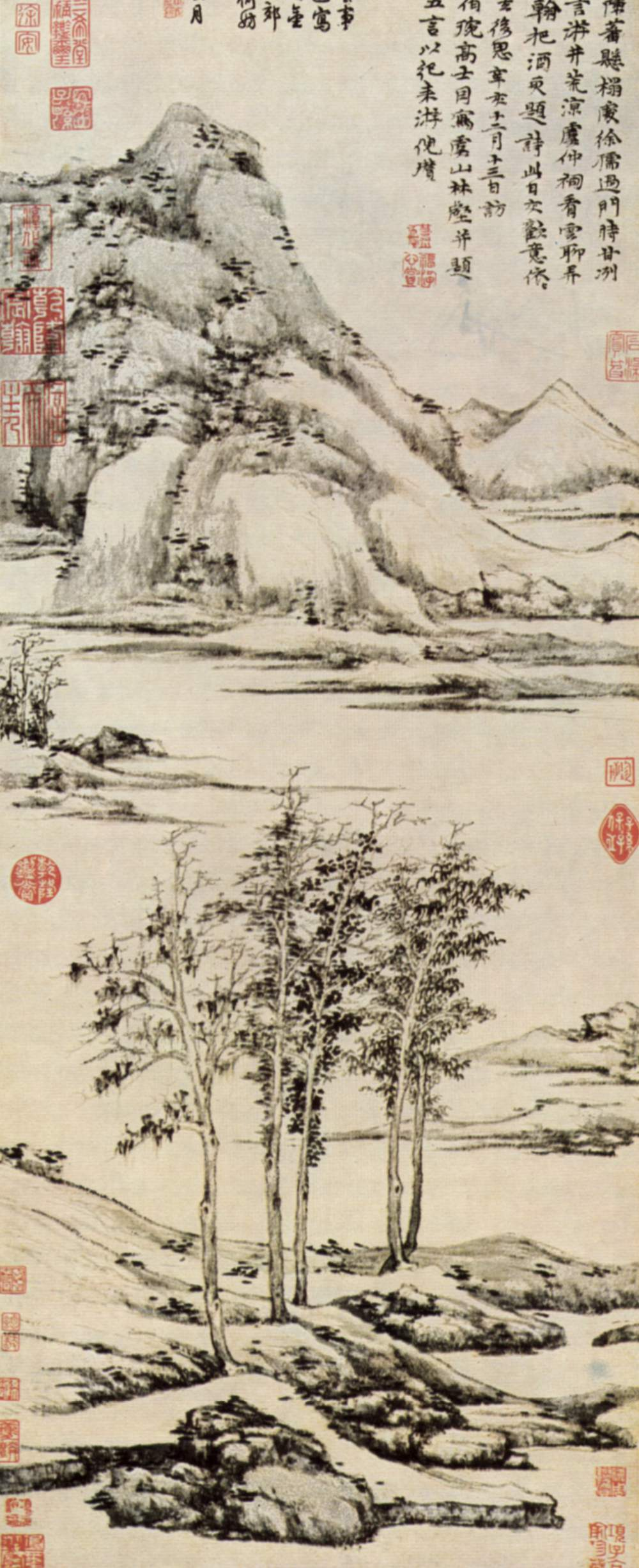
Ni Zan, Trees in a River Valley in Yü shan, private collection, New York City

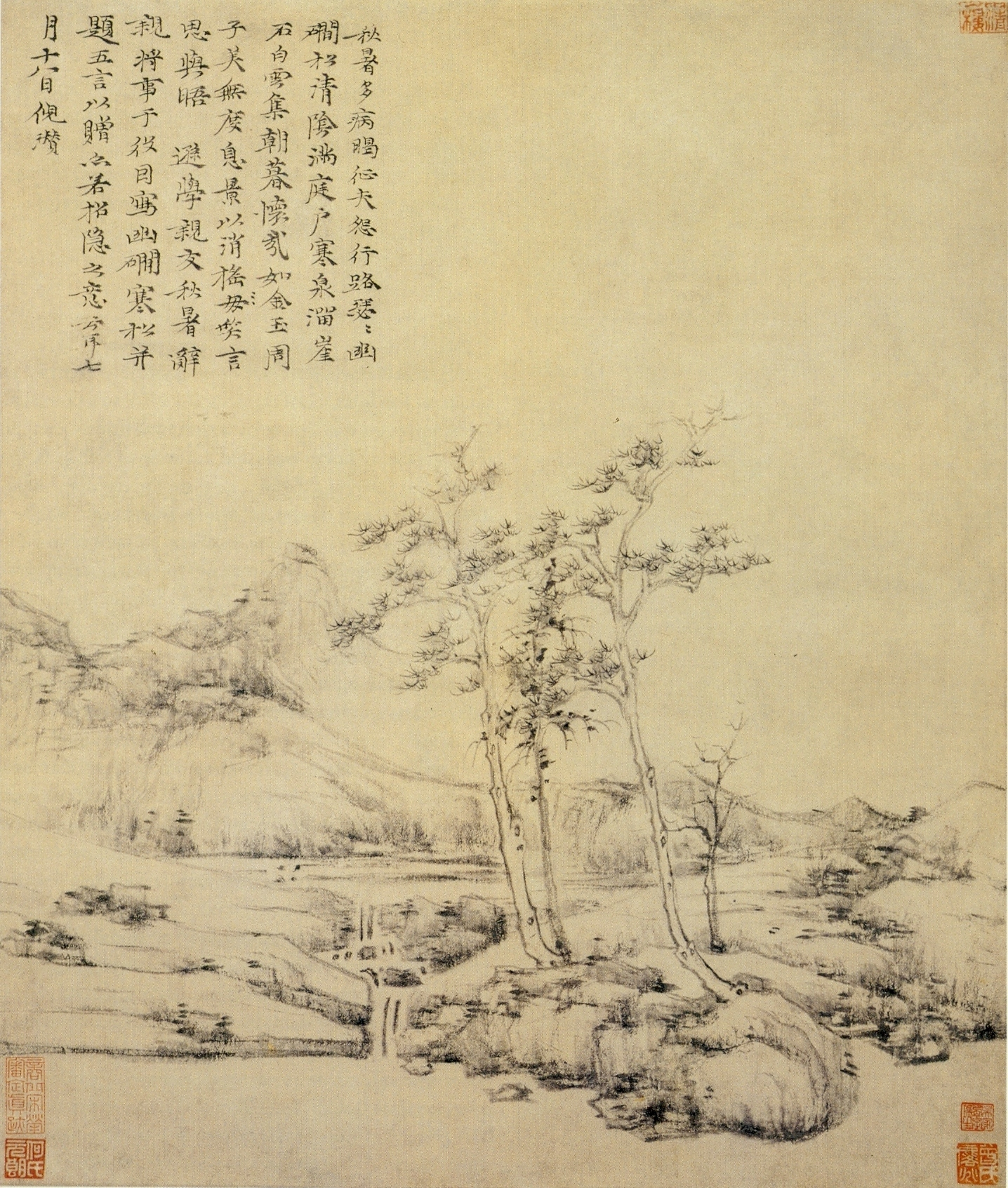
The Distant Cold Flow Pine, collection of the Palace Museum, Beijing.

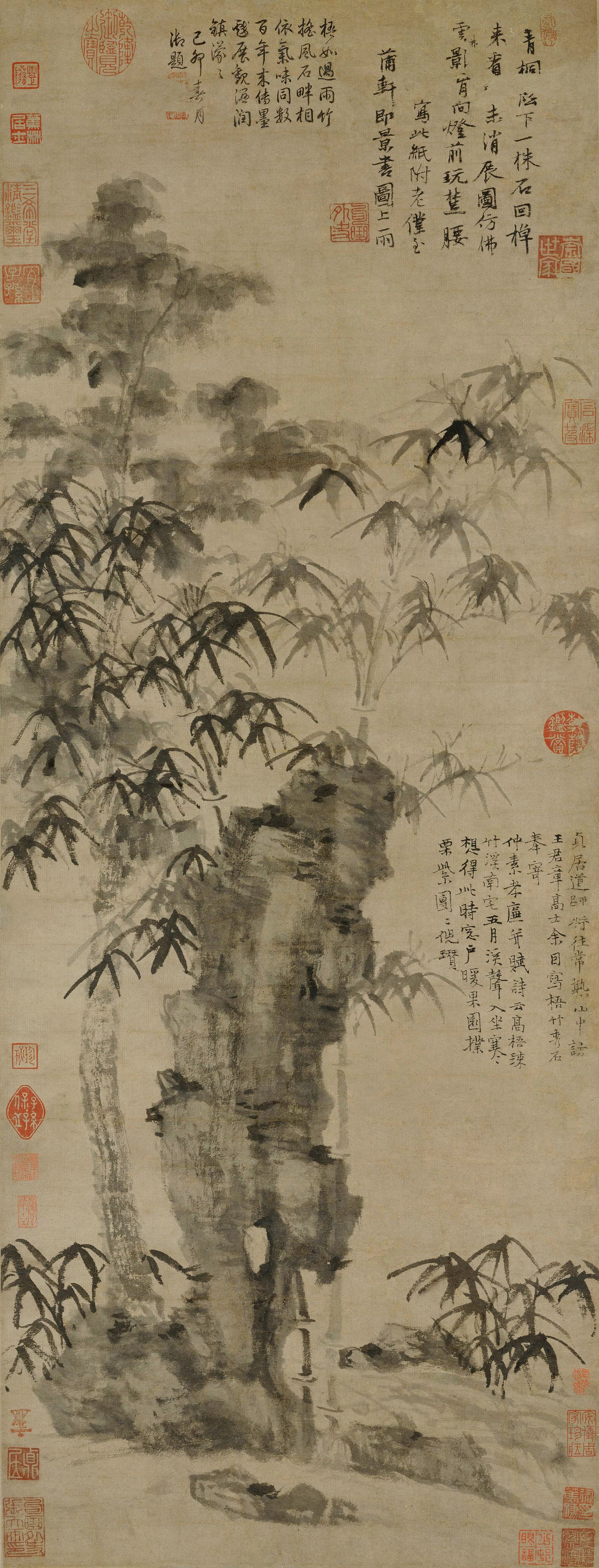
Bamboo, and Elegant Stone, collection of the Palace Museum, Beijing

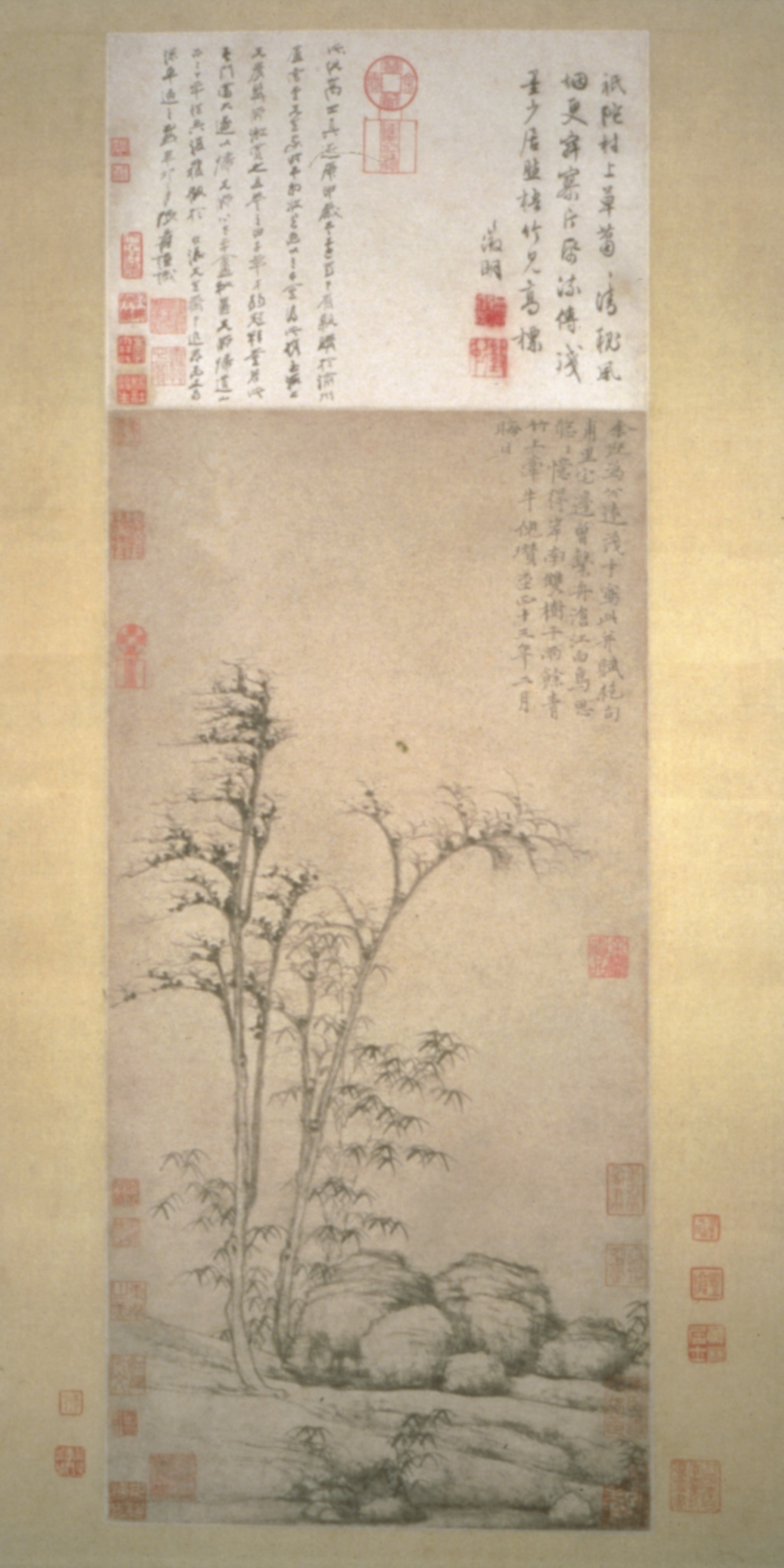
Twin Trees by the South Bank (Annan shuangshu), 1353, collection of the Princeton University Art Museum
