= Wuchang, Sichuan =

Wuchang 吴场镇
- Town
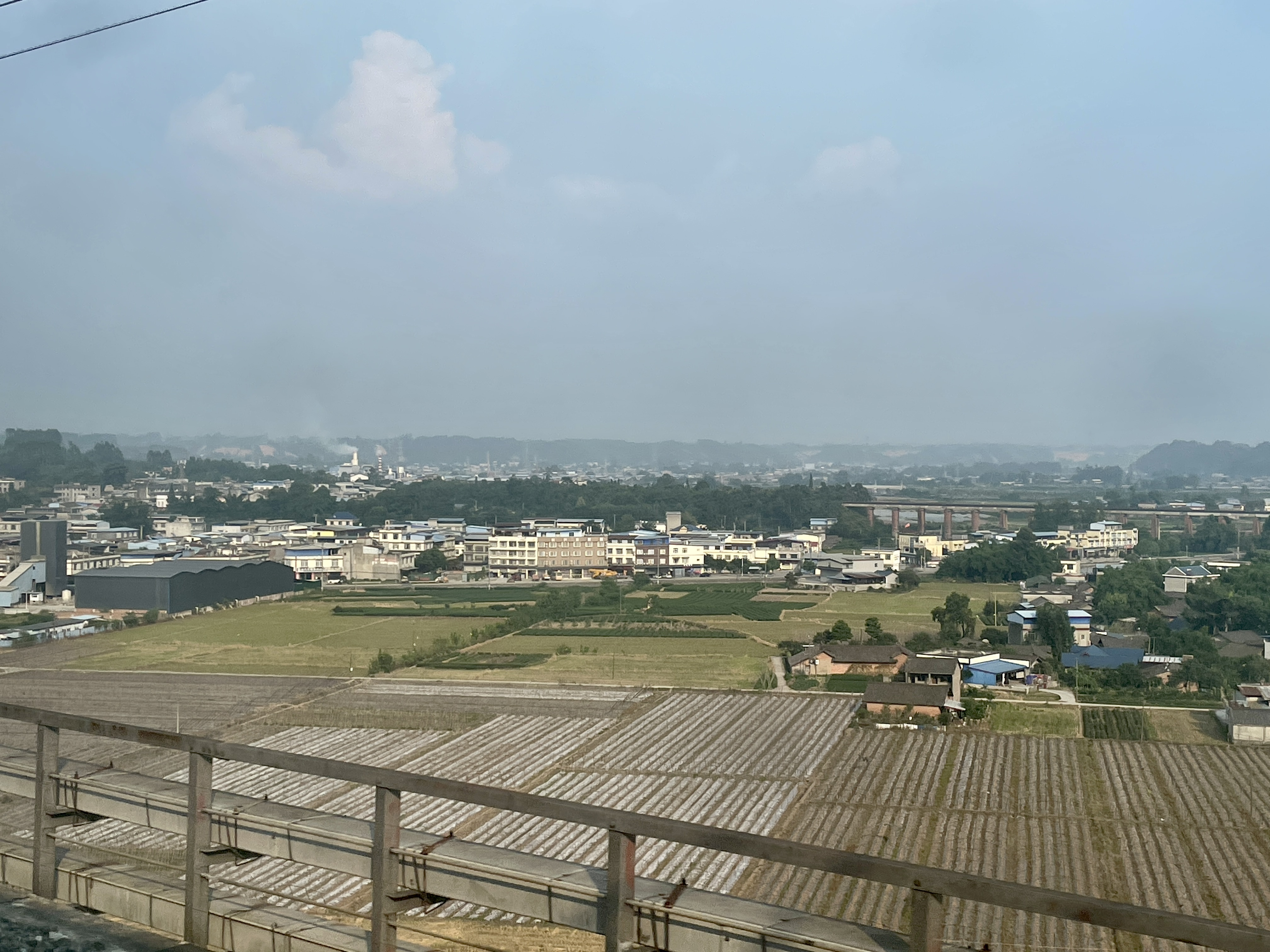

- Location in Sichuan
- Coordinates: 29.8746°N 103.6423°E
- Country: People's Republic of China
- Province: Sichuan
- Prefecture-level City: Leshan
- County: Jiajiang County
- Time zone: UTC+8 (China Standard)

Wuchang (simplified Chinese: 吴场; traditional Chinese: 吳場; pinyin: Wúchǎng) is a town in Jiajiang County, Sichuan, China. As of 2023, it administers Jinbolin Community (金柏林社区), Sandongqiao Community (三洞桥社区), and the following ten villages:

- Longhua Village (龙华村)
- Bailong Village (白龙村)
- Guanghui Village (光辉村)
- Renhe Village (仁和村)
- Jianchuan Village (建川村)
- Sanguan Village (三管村)
- Xinhe Village (新合村)
- Baicha Village (百茶村)
- Fengshou Village (丰收村)
- Guangrong Village (光荣村)

== See also ==
- List of township-level divisions of Sichuan
