= Huang Gongwang =

Late Song Dynasty painter (1269–1354)

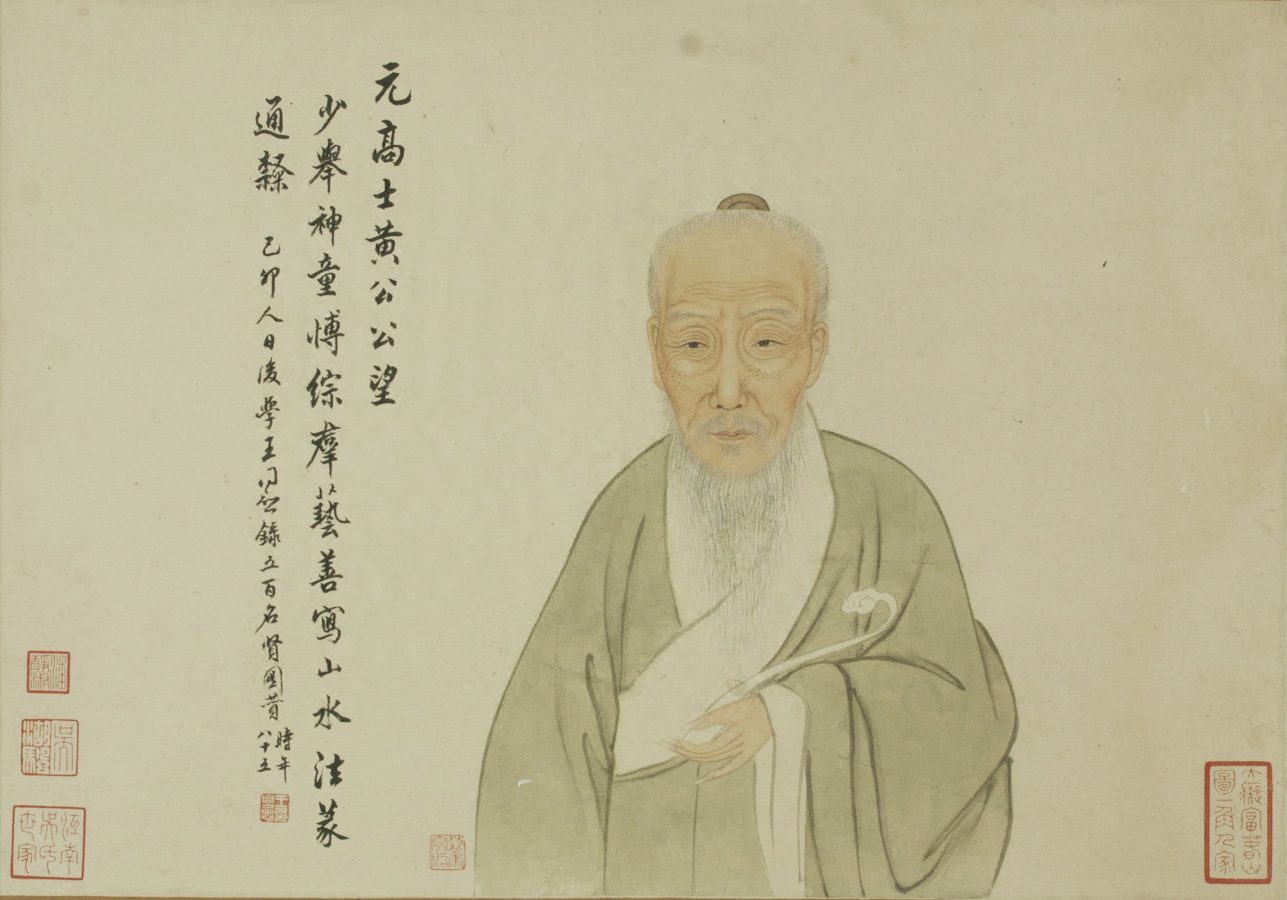
- Traditional Chinese: 黃公望
- Simplified Chinese: 黄公望
Transcriptions
Standard Mandarin
- Hanyu Pinyin: Huáng Gōngwàng
- Wade–Giles: Huang^{2} Kung^{1}-wang^{4}
- IPA: [xwǎŋ kʊ́ŋwâŋ]

Style name
- Traditional Chinese: 子久
- Simplified Chinese: 子久
Transcriptions
Standard Mandarin
- Hanyu Pinyin: Zǐ Jiǔ
- Wade–Giles: Tzu^{3} Chiu^{3}

Sobriquet
- Traditional Chinese: 大癡道人
- Simplified Chinese: 大痴道人
- Literal meaning: A Silly Daoist
Transcriptions
Standard Mandarin
- Hanyu Pinyin: Dàchī Dàorén
- Wade–Giles: Ta^{4}-ch'ih^{1} Tao^{4}-jen^{2}

Alternate sobriquet
- Traditional Chinese: 一峰道人
- Simplified Chinese: 一峰道人
- Literal meaning: Daoist of One Peak
Transcriptions
Standard Mandarin
- Hanyu Pinyin: Yīfēng Dàorén
- Wade–Giles: I^{1}-feng^{1} Tao^{4}-jen^{2}

Dwelling in the Fuchun Mountains by Huang Gongwang, c. 1350

Huang Gongwang (born 1269, Changshu, Jiangsu province, China—died 1354), birth name Lu Jian (Chinese: 陸堅; pinyin: Lù Jiān), was a Chinese painter, poet and writer born at the end of the Song dynasty in Changshu, Jiangsu. He was the oldest of the "Four Masters of the Yuan dynasty" (1206-1368).

== Biography ==
At the age of 10, the Song dynasty fell to the Yuan dynasty and he, like many other Chinese scholars of the time, found his path to officialdom and a good career severely limited. "He was first an unranked ling-shih at a Surveillance Office in the Chiang-che Branch Secretariat (Province), probably engaged in some sort of land tax supervision. Later he served as a secretary in the metropolitan Censorate where he was unfortunately involved in the slander case of a minister, Chang Lu. He seems to have spent quite some time in jail before retreating into Taoism [as did many others of the age—another was the famous painter Ni Zan], completely disillusioned." He spent his last years in the Fu-ch'un mountains near Hangzhou devoting himself to Taoism. There, over a three-year period (1347–50), he completed one of his most famous, and arguably greatest, works, a long hand scroll Dwelling in the Fuchun Mountains.

In art he rejected the landscape conventions of his era's Academy, but is now regarded as an exemplification of the "literati painters", the wenrenhua ideal. Art historian James Cahill identified Huang Gongwang as the artist who "most decisively altered the course of landscape painting, creating models that would have a profound effect on landscapists of later centuries." One of Huang's strongest influences was his technique of using very dry brush strokes together with light ink washes (when colour is applied to a specific area using a soft-haired brush with wide strokes that blend them together into a unified wash) to build up his landscape paintings. He also wrote a treatise on landscape painting, Secrets of Landscape Painting (寫山水訣, Xiě Shānshuǐ Jué).

His landscape painting's style and tone stands at an intersection of ancient masters, namely, Juran and Dong Yuan of the Five Dynasties, the Four Wangs, Shen Zhou, Dong Qichang as well as others of the Ming and Qing dynasties.

As was typical for Chinese scholar-officials of his era, he also wrote poetry and had some talent for music.
