= Wuchang railway station (Heilongjiang) =

Railway station in Harbin, China

Coordinates: 44.9127°N 127.1353°E

Wuchang 五常
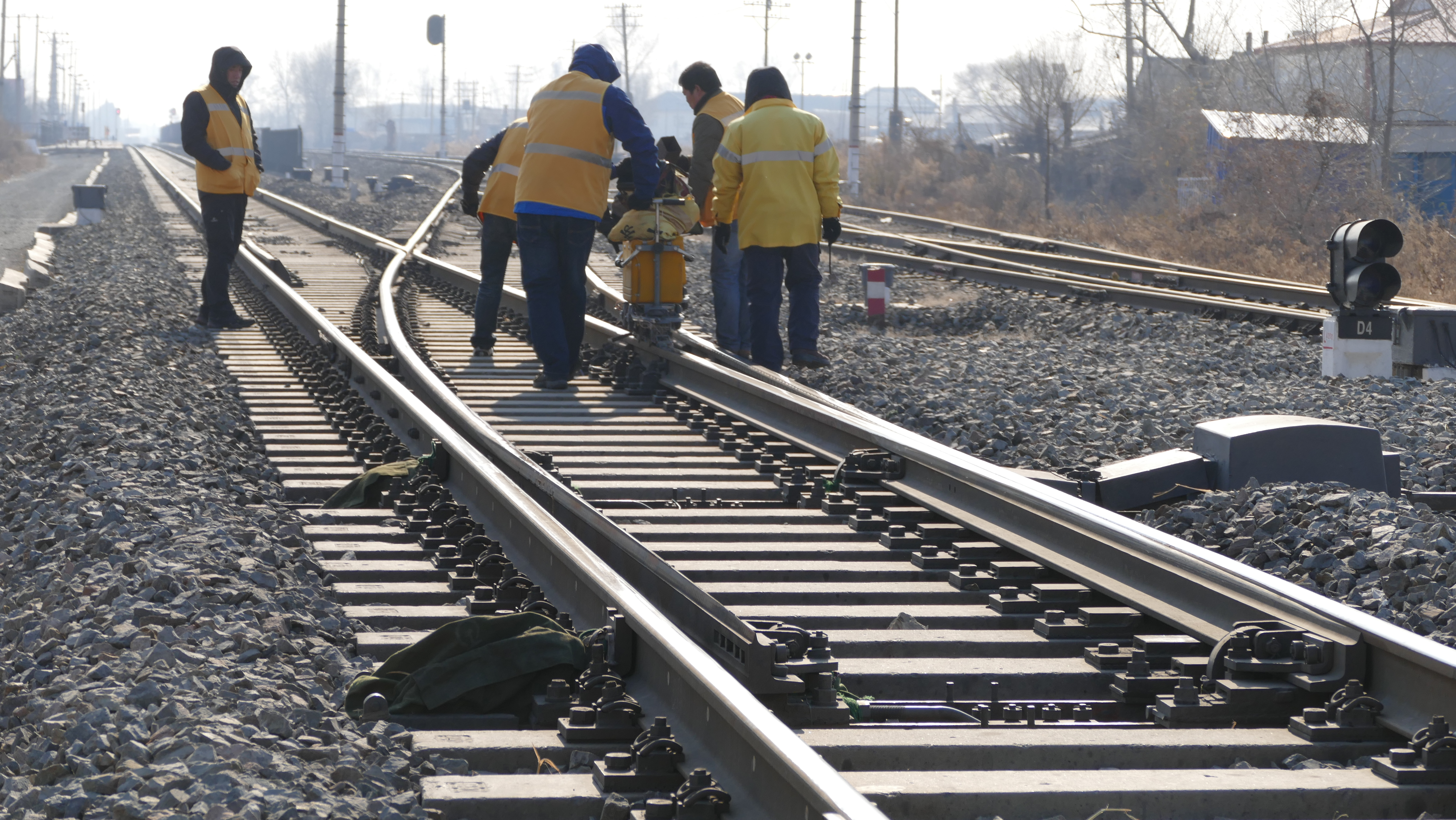

General information
- Location: Wuchang, Harbin, Heilongjiang; China
- Operated by: China Railway
- Line(s): Lafa–Harbin Railway

Wuchang railway station is a railway station of Lafa–Harbin Railway located in Wuchang, Harbin, Heilongjiang province, China.

== See also ==
- Lafa–Harbin Railway
