= Four Masters of the Yuan dynasty =

Grouping of major Chinese painters during the Yuan dynasty period (1271–1368)

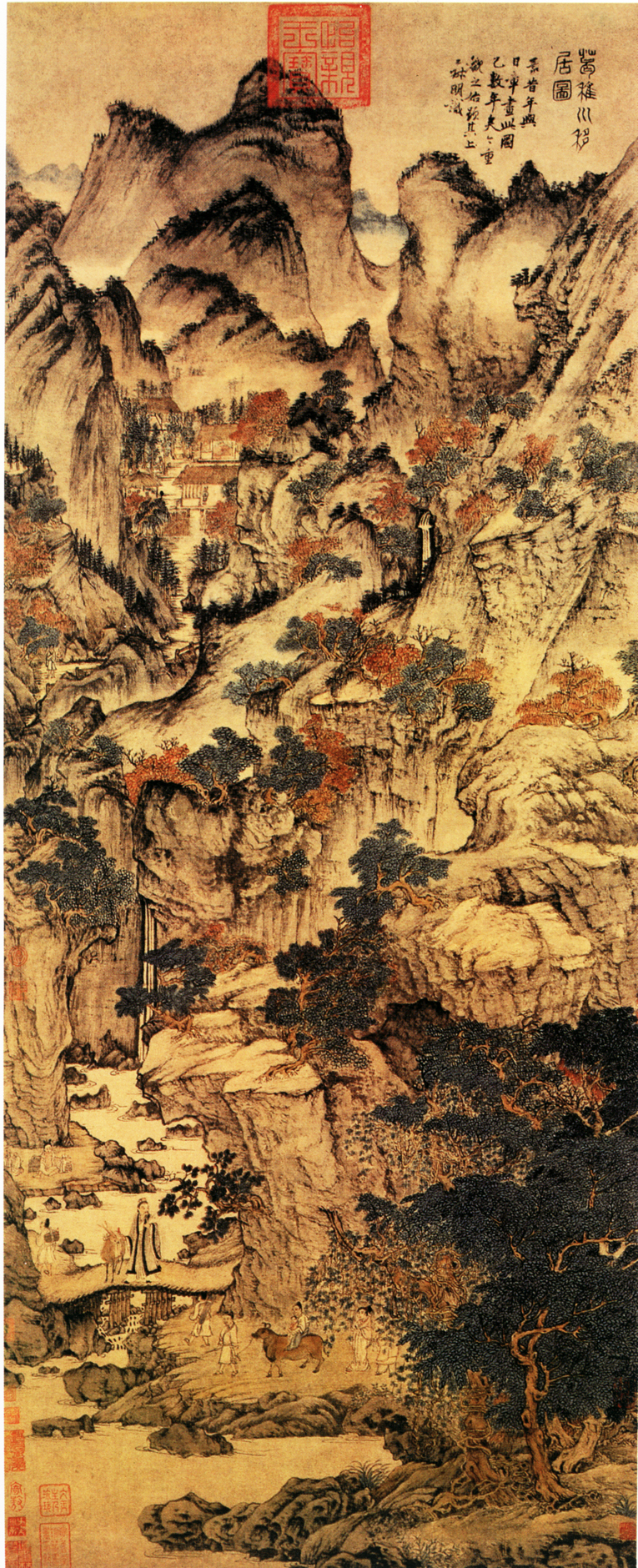
Wang Meng, Ge Zhichuan Moving (葛稚川移居图), Palace Museum, Beijing

The Four Masters of the Yuan dynasty (Chinese: 元四家; pinyin: Yuán Sì Jiā) is a name used to collectively describe the four Chinese painters: Huang Gongwang, Wu Zhen, Ni Zan, and Wang Meng, who were active during the Yuan dynasty (1271–1368). They were revered during the Ming dynasty and later periods as major exponents of the tradition of “literati painting” (wenrenhua), which was concerned more with individual expression and learning than with outward representation and immediate visual appeal.

Huang Gongwang and Wu Zhen belonged to the earlier generation of artists in the Yuan period and consciously emulated the work of ancient masters, especially the pioneering artists of the Five Dynasties period, such as Dong Yuan and Juran, who rendered landscape in a broad, almost Impressionistic manner, with coarse brushstrokes and wet ink washes. While these painters were also respected by the two younger Yuan masters, the restrained thinness of Ni Zan and the almost embroidered richness of Wang Meng distinguished their work from that of their immediate predecessors.

The work of the Four Masters spurred experimentation with novel brushstroke techniques, with a new attention to the vocabulary of brush manipulation.

== See also ==
- Four Masters of the Ming dynasty
- Six Masters of the early Qing period (Four Wangs)
