= Wu Zhen (painter) =

14th-century Chinese painter

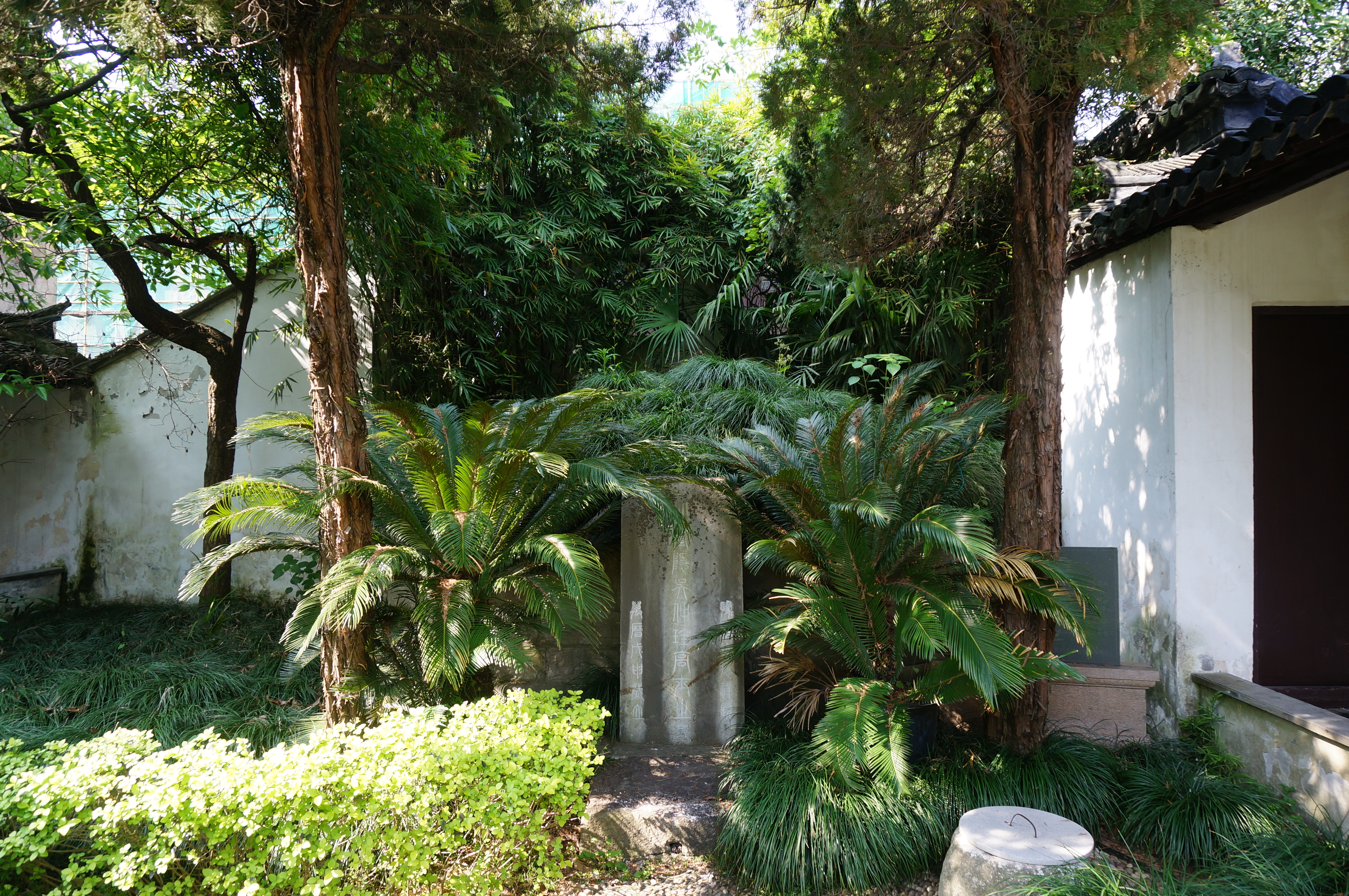
Tomb of Wu Zhen

Wu Zhen (simplified Chinese: 吴镇; traditional Chinese: 吳鎮; pinyin: Wú Zhèn) (courtesy name: Zhonggui 仲圭; art name: Meihuadaoren 梅花道人) (1280–1354 C.E.) was a Chinese painter during the Yuan dynasty. He was best known for being one of the Four Masters of the Yuan.

== Biography ==
He was born in Weitang (now known as Chengguan). Most of his family is unknown.

Zhen graduated being educated in philosophy and swordsmanship. Shortly after his graduation, he chose to become a painter. His paintings did not sell well, but he had close friends who taught him how to paint, including Wu Guan, Zhang Guan, and Tao Zhongyi.

== Artworks ==
Many of Zhen's artworks were landscape paintings and paintings of bamboo. He also occasionally inserted poems into his artworks, which also helped him become better at calligraphy, poetry and artwork simultaneously.

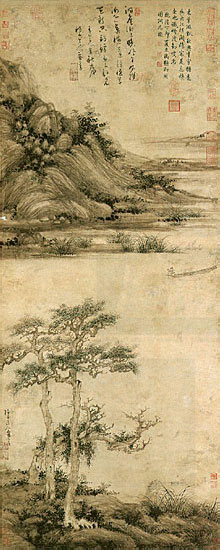
Wu Zhen, Hermit Fisherman on Lake Dongting

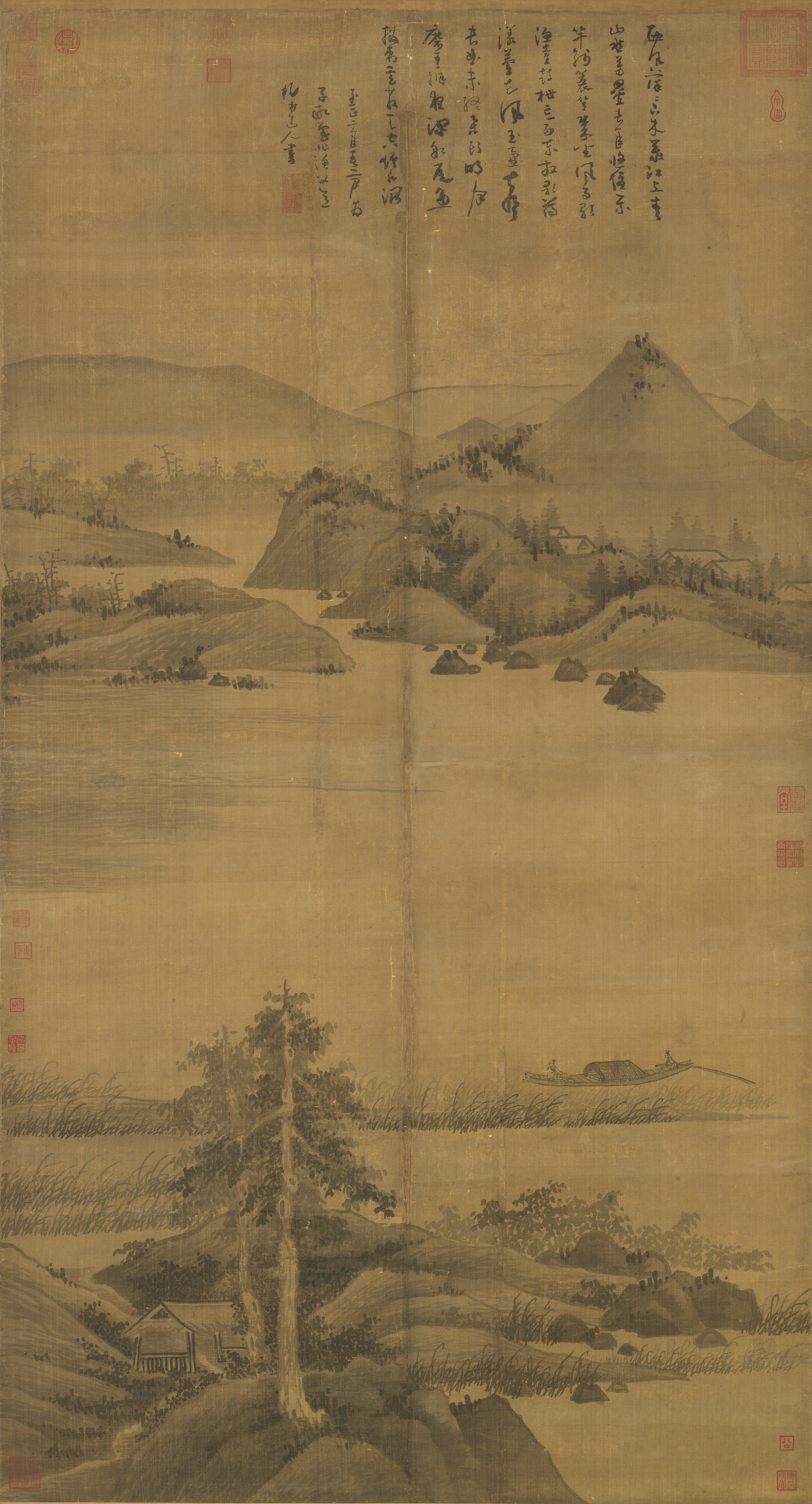
Wu Zhen, Fisherman, National Palace Museum
