= Chen Tingjing =

Chinese politician and scholar

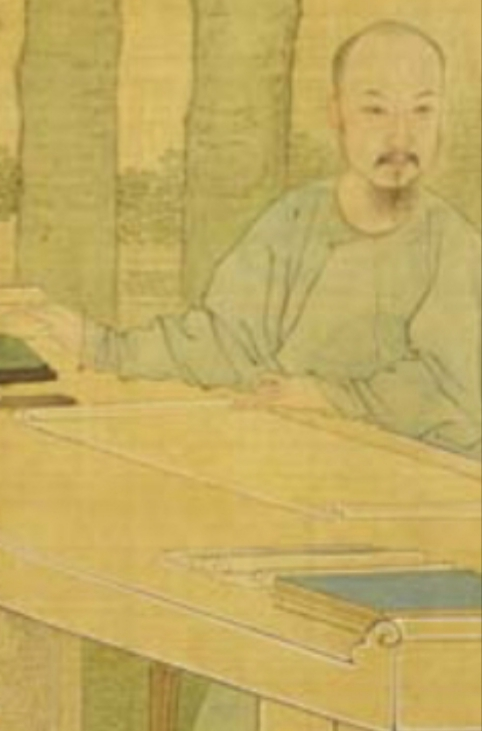

Grand Secretary of the Wenyuan Library
- In office 1703–1710

Minister of Revenue
- In office 23 March – 18 October 1687 Serving with Ke'erkun
- Preceded by: Yu Guozhu
- Succeeded by: Wang Rizao
- In office 30 December 1693 – 25 December 1699 Serving with Maci
- Preceded by: Wang Zhi
- Succeeded by: Li Zhenyu

Minister of Personnel
- In office 18 October 1687 – 6 June 1688 Serving with Ke'erkun (until 1688), Liaodan (1688)
- Preceded by: Li Zhifang
- Succeeded by: Zhang Shizhen
- In office 25 December 1699 – 5 June 1703 Serving with Kurene (until 1700), Silda (since 1700)
- Preceded by: Xiong Cili
- Succeeded by: Li Guangdi

Personal details
- Born: 31 December 1638 Zezhou, Shanxi
- Died: 23 May 1712 (aged 73) Beijing, Zhili

Chen Tingjing (Chinese: 陳廷敬; pinyin: Chén Tíngjìng; Wade–Giles: Ch’ên T’ing-ching, 31 December 1638 – 23 May 1712) was a Han Chinese politician and scholar who served as tutor to the Kangxi Emperor and was chief editor of the Kangxi Dictionary.

== Biography ==
Chen Tingjing
- Traditional Chinese: 陳廷敬
- Simplified Chinese: 陈廷敬
Transcriptions
Standard Mandarin
- Hanyu Pinyin: Chén Tíngjìng

Posthumous name
- Chinese: 文貞
Transcriptions
Standard Mandarin
- Hanyu Pinyin: Wénzhēn

Chen Jing was born in Zezhou in Shanxi province. He obtained a jinshi degree in the imperial examination in 1658 and was given the vocable "Ting" by the Shunzhi Emperor to differentiate him from another successful candidate with the same name. He served in a number of official posts during his long career, working in the Imperial Diary Office in 1672 before being appointed sub-chancellor of the Grand Secretariat in 1676. Shortly after, he was also appointed chancellor of the Hanlin Academy. In 1678, Chen was sent to serve in the Imperial Study with Ye Fang'ai, but returned home to observe a mourning period for his mother who recently died. In 1682, Chen became chief-examiner of metropolitan examination and was also tasked with compiling music for court festivals and gatherings. He served a stint at the Imperial Mint in 1684 and was involved in currency reform. To discourage the practice of melting down currency to profit from the higher price of the metal, Chen successfully petitioned a decrease in the weight of copper coins and suggested that copper mines be opened to private operation. In 1684, Chen was also appointed senior president of the Censorate and president of the Board of Works two years later. At the same time, he served as a director of the Historiographical Board, helping compile the History of Ming. In 1688, the governor of Hubei, Zhang Qian, was implicated in a bribery case, which also involved Xu Qianxue and Gao Shiqi. Chen, being a relative of the accused, resigned from his post. He was soon recalled to office two years later but temporarily resigned again to undertake a period of mourning. In 1694, Chen again became a director in the Historiographical Board and continued working on literary projects sponsored by the government.

In 1703, Chen Tingjing was made Grand Secretary of the Wenyuan Library. He accompanied the emperor during his fifth tour of the South in 1705 before retiring on grounds of ill-health in 1710. However, Chen was immediately recalled to office to look after government affairs after the death of one Grand Secretary, Zhang Yushu, and the absence of another, Li Guangdi. During his final years, he served as one of the chief editors of the Kangxi Dictionary. He died in office in 1712. After Chen's death, the emperor personally wrote an elegy dedicated to him and ordered his third son, Yunzhi, and other high officials to attend his funeral. He was honoured with the posthumous name Wénzhēn.

== Poetry ==
Chen was a highly accomplished poet during his lifetime, believing that the fundamental purpose of poetry was to encourage moral virtue. He took an exceptional interest in Tang poetry and considered Du Fu to be the epitome of poetic excellence. The Kangxi Emperor regarded his poetic talents to be the best out of all his high officials and he was gifted the Imperial Poetry Collection (Yuzhi shiji) in 1678. Later in his life, he was also entrusted with editing the Peiwen Yunfu and the Yuxuan Tangshi, an anthology of Tang poetry.

== Popular culture ==
Chen Tingjing is remembered as an upright and honest official. In 2018, CCTV produced a 39-episode television series, Yi dai ming xiang Chen Ting Jing (一代名相陈廷敬), which dramatizes his life and official career. His residence, the House of the Huangcheng Chancellor, in Shanxi is a popular tourist attraction today and was given an AAAAA rating in 2011 by the China National Tourism Administration.

== See also ==
- Kangxi Dictionary
- House of the Huangcheng Chancellor
