= Xiong Cili =

Grand Secretary of the Eastern Library
- In office 1699–1703

Grand Secretary of the Wuying Hall
- In office 1675–1676

Minister of Rites
- In office July 24, 1688 – December 23, 1688 Serving with Gūbadai
- Preceded by: Zhang Shizhen
- Succeeded by: Zhang Yushu
- In office December 12, 1690 – November 25, 1692 Serving with Gūbadai
- Preceded by: Zhang Ying
- Succeeded by: Zhang Ying

Minister of Personnel
- In office November 25, 1692 – December 25, 1699 Serving with Kurene
- Preceded by: Li Tianfu
- Succeeded by: Chen Tingjing

Personal details
- Born: December 13, 1635; Xiaogan, Hubei
- Died: 1709; Nanjing, Jiangsu

Xiong Cili (Chinese: 熊賜履; pinyin: Xióng cìlǚ; Wade–Giles: Hsiung Tz'ŭ-li, 13 December 1635 – 1709) was a Han Chinese politician, scholar, and philosopher in the Qing dynasty.

== Biography ==
Xiong Cili
- Traditional Chinese: 熊賜履
- Simplified Chinese: 熊赐履
Transcriptions
Standard Mandarin
- Hanyu Pinyin: Xióng cìlǚ

Posthumous name
- Chinese: 文端
Transcriptions
Standard Mandarin
- Hanyu Pinyin: Wénduān

Xiong hailed from Xiaogan, Hubei. He took the imperial examination in 1657, earning a juren degree and then a jinshi degree in 1685. In 1665 he was promoted from corrector to assistant reader in the Hongwen yuan (宏文院). He then became sub-chancellor of the Guoshi yuan (國史院) in 1670 before becoming chancellor of the Hanlin Academy in the winter of that year. He was made Grand Secretary of Wuying Hall and Minister of Justice in 1675. Around this time, Xiong was also ordered to undertake various literary projects. He was given the responsibility of compiling of the imperial edicts of Taizong, the Taizong shengxun (太宗聖訓) and entrusted with reediting of the official chronicles of Taizong, the Taizong shilu (太宗實錄). He also was ordered to oversee the production of a work concerning the Classic of Filial Piety. However, the following year, Xiong attempted to shift blame onto a colleague for an error he committed whilst drafting an imperial rescript, resulting in his dismissal from office. Xiong settled in Nanjing, where he spent the next twelve years.

In 1688, Xiong was recalled to office and appointed Minister of Rites. Starting in the 1680s, Xiong became involved in factional struggles in the court, allying himself with Xu Qianxue and Songgotu against Li Guangdi, whom he was jealous of. As was custom, Xiong temporarily took leave to mourn his mother who died in the winter of 1688. After completing his mourning, he was appointed Minister of Personnel in 1692. In 1694, he became chief examiner of the Metropolitan Examinations, returning to serve in that role again in 1697, 1700 and 1703. He became a Grand Secretary once more in 1699 and was charged with supervising work on the History of Ming and the compilation of the Pingding shuomo fang lüe, an official account of the Qing campaigns against the Dzungars. Xiong was granted leave to retire in 1703 but remained in the capital to provide occasional advice. He worked on the drafts of the History of Ming in retirement and returned to Nanjing two years later. He died in 1709 and was honoured with posthumous name Wenduan (文端). His name was included in the Temple of Eminent Statesmen during the reign of Yongzheng.

== Philosophy ==
A prominent Neo-Confucian scholar, Xiong was a staunch adherent of the Cheng Brothers. He devoted much effort into proving the doctrines of Wang Yangming unorthodox and considered those philosophers to be 'promiscuous thinkers'.
