= Zhai Yongming =

Chinese poet from Chengdu (born 1955)

Zhai Yongming (born 1955) is a Chinese poet, essayist and screenwriter from Chengdu, in the southwest Sichuan Province. Born during the Maoist era, Zhai was forcibly sent away for two years to do manual labor in the countryside as part of the Cultural Revolution, eventually returning to Chengdu to work as a poet. Her poems began getting published in 1981, but her rise to critical acclaim came with the release of her poem cycle 'Woman' (published between 1984 and 1986), featuring one of the first instances of a socially-aware woman expressing her societal perspectives in Chinese literature. She has been marked by scholars as a foundational Chinese feminist poet, being the first to explore elements of gender and feminine identity beyond the scope of the male-oriented gaze; 'Woman' has even been appointed as the starting point for the subsequent 'Black Tornado' era of confessional Chinese women writers. Among her most notable works include poetry works are 'Jing'an Village (1985),' 'Plain Songs in the Dark Night (1997),' 'Collected Poems by Zhai Yongming (1994),' 'The Most Tactful Words (2009),' and 'Roaming the Fuchun Mountains with Huang Gongwang (2015).'

Though she was born during the Cultural Revolution's era of 'Misty Poets (朦胧诗人)' writers, scholars tentatively agree that she belongs to the succeeding 'Newborn Generation (xinsheng dai 新生代)' poets as she had pushed their literary style further.

Zhai lived in the United States briefly from 1990 to 1992, and later in her career she opened a bar in Chengdu called White Nights, which became a well-known hub for artists to congregate at during cultural festivals. She often travels between Chengdu, Europe and the United States for international conferences and poetry festivals.

Zhai has screenwriter credits through co-writing with filmmaker Jia Zhangke on his movie 24 City, and is a co-founder of Wings, a Chinese feminist poetry journal.

== Biography ==
=== Early life ===
Zhai was born and raised in Chengdu, China, in the southwest of Sichuan Province. Like many others in her youth, she was made to work in the countryside as part of the Maoist era's plans for a Cultural Revolution, which reflected the idealistic push for women's entrance in the workforce as a means of gaining national wealth. The hardships she endured during her two years of labouring became one of her main inspirational themes at the start of her career.

=== Education ===
Zhai enrolled into the University of Electronic Science and Technology of China in 1976 after her mandatory labour was done, graduating in 1980. Having majored in the study of laser technologies, she decided to work as an engineer at the Physics Research Institute, before eventually quitting in 1986 to pursue her poetry career.

=== Career motivations & personal beliefs ===
Zhai's reasoning for giving up the financial stability of her job at the Research Institute was that she felt too constricted by its rigorous environment, believing that her prospects for promotion were unsatisfactory. While this choice was shocking to her peers and family, Zhai reaffirmed that poetry was her own religion; it provided her with the freedom of expression she longed for and the ability to take control of her life, granting her more fulfillment than money and status could.

The poet revealed her personal sense of duty as writer towards Chinese women who may not have the option to voice their opinions against societal injustices. She also points out her disdain for the pre-destined role of the 'female poet,' women writers who were only accepted as long as they did not threaten patriarchal norms with outspoken verse.

One of her values as a writer lies in staying true to her roots: while she is not opposed to Chinese literary trends and the complexities of poetic verse, she wishes to follow her own intuition regarding poetic language and thematic choices. She stands by the knowledge that her status as a woman comes before her poet identity; her works continuously hold a conscious acknowledgement of women's oppression as she navigates the waves of Chinese literati culture.

== Style and thought ==
=== Poetic influences ===
Among her more notable poetic influences, a major inspiration for Zhai's early works is American poet Sylvia Plath, herself a world renowned feminist poet. Plath's confessional style and 'dark' imagery can be seen reflected in Zhai's poem cycles, especially in collective works like 'Woman' and 'Plain Songs in the Dark Night' and most explicitly in 'Song of the Café,' written in 1993 after Zhai's return from America. As Plath inspired Zhai's use of dark themes and complex depictions of death, her influence subsequently helped build the emergence of the 'Black Tornado' era of Chinese feminist poetry through Zhai's own groundbreaking initiatives.

Additionally, Plath and Zhai share a similar distaste towards modern technology and science's influential hold on social order, this apprehension stemming from its potential of pushing individuals towards a destructive mindset of self-alienation, though Zhai's own sentiments are depicted more subtly.

Zhai has also expressed a strong love for the Irish poet W.B. Yeats, naming him as one of her strongest influences during her interview with Jia Zhang-Ke.

The poet does not shy away from writing about how other artists' works have inspired her poetry, composing an entire poetic piece based on the emotional journey she experienced while observing fellow artist Huang Gongwang's famous painting "Dwelling In The Fuchun Mountains" (completed between 1347 and 1350). This inspired Zhai to write her landscape poem "Roaming the Fuchun Mountains with Huang Gongwang" (2015).

=== Main themes: gender, femininity, darkness, the subconscious mind and the dream ===
Zhai's works predominantly rely on re-shaping normalized concepts gender and femininity, using imagery of darkness and the night to convey unquantifiable depths of emotion in her poetic dialogues. The poet exploits the night's traditionally 'feminine' connotations in Chinese culture to create metaphors for women's pain and explore their psyches under the quiet cover of moonlight. Her acclaimed poetry collection 'Woman' features poems exploring the subconscious feminine mind through such metaphors of darkness and dream, as well as providing a space where women who would normally feel invisible in the daytime can be 'seen' in the enlightening poetic space Zhai creates for them. Using this "nocturnal writing" style as a gateway for women's self-reflexive, subconscious progressive thoughts was radical for her time, as the traditionally quiet, feminine night suddenly became a symbol for societal reform. The metaphorical cover of night provided Zhai with a space to express the seriousness of her feminist dialogues by passing them off as a fantasy 'dream world,' tentatively pushing women to wonder about the strangeness of their positions in the world's supposed 'natural order.' Nighttime thus became a space for renewal, change exploration of the self.

Nonetheless, the poet explicitly shares her frustrations towards the perception of women's literature as solely residing on political reform, stating that her works are more than just a cry for women's liberation. In the constant re-framing of women's poetry as anti-patriarchy texts, she believes the core goals of celebrating womanhood and its many complexities becomes muddled, thus reducing the scope of meaning for 'women's poetry' to its association with men.

Zhai also strives to blur concepts of gender identity in her later writing, asserting that the lyrical "I" in her poems is never specified to be feminine. She explains that while she does use gendered imagery, she actively refutes 'inherent' connotations of masculine or feminine, further highlighting how normalized assumptions of patriarchal power imbalance pervade an artist's imaginary world just as in real life.

=== Addressing 'taboo' topics ===
Zhai is known as one of the first women writers in China to discuss the non-beautiful aspects of femininity including things like the trials of childbirth, menstruation, and the transformations of the female body with age, all subjects that are traditionally considered taboo.

She also expressed her dissatisfaction with the country's socio-political endeavours, namely criticizing how tone-deaf it is to highlight the beauty of natural landscapes in the context of the modern urbanization of city life. In other words, Zhai resents the capitalization of the 'pastoral' effect, one where the sensations of loss of nature's inherent beauty is sold to the public by implementing portioned reminders of its splendour, such as the existence of private beaches or the insertion of artificial lakes in industrialized cities. This theme of uneasy nostalgia is central in her work "Roaming the Fuchun Mountains with Huang Gongwang" (2015), as her own class consciousness and environmentalist values lead to a discussion of the wavering balance between human life and the natural world: while both used to co-exist harmoniously, current societal shifts towards natural destruction may affect the human soul.

On her other political views, Zhai openly speaks about the spiritual and psychological suffering she and many others endured as a result of the Cultural Revolution's Maoist agenda, comparing the experience to becoming alienated from the land. To be forced into a harsh rural lifestyle under authoritarian watch was nothing short of disheartening, and Zhai focuses on this overwhelming loneliness in her poetry.

Her poetry collection "Most Tactful Phrases" highlights intersectionality as a new perspective on the status of Chinese modernism, as the country's current political pushes for 'regime change' continually disregarded the underlying intersectional feminism, thus continuing to negate opportunities for women's progress.

=== Style from 80s to 90s ===
Zhai's style of writing in the eighties consisted of viewing the world from a historical perspective while employing a distinctly structured and direct style of prose, though by the nineties her writing becomes more flexible and fragmentary regarding the specificity of language. Her nineties style also took on a reserved air, indicating a rise in maturity for the poet: upon returning from her two-year American stay, Zhai showed her growth as a writer in "Song of the Café" (1993), which featured realistic narrative modes through the characters' perspectives as opposed to her usual confessional speaker.

=== The Poetic Turn of the 2000s ===
Since the early 2000s, Zhai Yongming's poetry has undergone a profound transformation, moving beyond the introspective exploration of female subjectivity that characterized her earlier work toward a broader engagement with ecological crisis, historical memory, and the ethical consequences of modernization. Rather than representing a simple thematic expansion, this development has been interpreted as a fundamental reconfiguration of her poetics, in which the female body, landscape, and history become interconnected dimensions of a single imaginative and ethical space. Within this trajectory, Ode to Yu Xuanji (2005), written during Zhai's residency at the Civitella Ranieri Foundation in Umbria, Italy, occupies a pivotal position as a turning point in her literary development. Composed at the intersection of Chinese cultural memory and an international artistic environment, the poem bridges the introspective, confessional voice of her early poetry with the socially and environmentally engaged writing of her later years. A recent interpretation further argues that this transformation is not merely thematic but poetological, reflecting a new conception of poetry itself. Through the rehabilitation of the Tang poet Yu Xuanji, the poem fuses the rewriting of female historical memory with ecological reflection into a single poetic project, suggesting that the violence inflicted upon women and that inflicted upon the natural world arise from the same structures of domination. Read from this perspective, Ode to Yu Xuanji represents one of the earliest and clearest formulations of the ecofeminist vision that would characterize Zhai's subsequent work. This interpretation also situates the poem within the framework of Wei Qingqi's "Way of Yin", arguing that Zhai's later poetry develops an ecofeminist poetics rooted in indigenous Chinese intellectual traditions—particularly Daoist notions of relationality, fluidity, and the complementarity of yin and yang—rather than simply adopting Western ecofeminist paradigms.

== Bibliography ==
=== Poetry collections ===
- Nüren (女人) (Woman) (1984) (1986)
- Jing’an Village (1985)
- Living In This World (1986)
- The Designs of Death (1987)
- Calling It All (1988)
- Above All the Roses (1989)
- "The Body" (1991)
- "Song of the Café" (1993)
- Collected Poems of Zhai Yongming (1994)
- Plain Songs in the Dark Night (1997)
- Zhai Yongming Poetry Record: The Most Tactful Words (2009)
- Fourteen Plain Songs (2011)
- The Changing Room: Selected Poetry by Zhai Yongming (2011)
- "Roaming the Fuchun Mountains with Huang Gongwang" (2015)

=== Other works ===
- Tales of White Nights (2008) (Essay Collection)

== Critical reception ==
Zhai's contemporaries and scholarly critics alike have dubbed her "the avant-garde poet of the third generation" due to her many progressive contributions to Chinese feminist literati culture, in addition to earning the title of a "stream of consciousness" poet thanks to her writing style.

When faced with criticism for supposed hypocrisy in attacking patriarchal systems in "The Most Tactful Phrases" (2009), Chinese critic Deng Wenhua stood in defence of Zhai's poetic dialogues. Rather than hold the helm as an 'anti-patriarchy figure' for women, he stressed that the poet's main goal in altering her prosaic style was the exploration of methods to unravel gendered nuances in Chinese literary culture.
