= Battle of Penghu =

1683 naval battle during the Qing conquest of Taiwan

Coordinates: 23.3900°N 119.5300°E

- Part of the Ming-Qing transition
Date	10–16 July 1683
Location	Penghu, Taiwan
Result	Qing victory Capitulation of Kingdom of Tungning to the Qing dynasty

Belligerents
Qing dynasty	Kingdom of Tungning

Commanders and leaders
Kangxi Emperor; Shi Lang	Zheng Keshuang; Liu Guoxuan (surrendered)

Strength
238 ships 21,000 men	200+ ships 20,000 men

Casualties and losses
329 officers and soldiers were killed	12000 soldiers were killed or drowned 4,800 surrendered or arrested

The Battle of Penghu (Chinese: 澎湖海戰) was a naval battle fought in 1683 between the Qing dynasty and the Kingdom of Tungning. The Qing admiral Shi Lang led a fleet to attack the Tungning forces in Penghu. Each side possessed more than 200 warships, while the Tungning admiral Liu Guoxuan's forces were outnumbered by Shi Lang's three to one. Liu surrendered when his flagship ran out of ammunition and fled back to Taiwan. The loss of Penghu resulted in the surrender of Zheng Keshuang, the last king of Tungning, to the Qing dynasty.

== Shi Lang ==
Admiral Shi Lang was the primary leader in advocating and organizing the Qing effort to conquer Zheng Taiwan. He was born in Jinjiang, Fujian in 1621 and became a soldier in the service of Zheng Zhilong at the age of 17. Shi served with distinction until he had a falling out with Koxinga. He quarreled with another commander, Chen Bin, and Koxinga took Chen's side. Shi also disagreed with Koxinga on strategic matters. Shi threatened to leave and become a monk, which annoyed Koxinga. Koxinga eventually imprisoned Shi for criticizing his behavior, which Shi described as being no different than that of a pirate. A relative of Shi's falsified orders from Koxinga to take Shi out for interrogation and he seized the opportunity to escape. Shi tried to seek mediation with Koxinga but his efforts failed and instead Koxinga sent an assassin after him. The assassination attempt failed. Koxinga executed Shi's father and brother in 1651, resulting in Shi's defection to the Qing.

Shi was assigned to follow Geng Jimao and pacify Ming loyalists in Guangdong and Guangxi before returning to Fujian in 1655. Shi was assigned to an assault force on a Zheng stronghold at the suggestion of another commander, Huang Wu, who had also defected from the Zheng side. The successful attack saw the surrender of Chen Bin and execution of 500 Zheng captives. In 1658, Shi was made Deputy Commander of Tongan. He continued to participate in campaigns against the Zhengs. Shi passed on information such as Zheng internal conflict between Koxinga and his son onto Beijing.

The Qing established a naval force in Fujian in 1662 and appointed Shi Lang as the commander. Huang and Shi advocated for more aggressive action against the Zhengs besides just a coastal evacuation policy. On 15 May 1663, Shi attacked the Zheng fleet and succeeded in capturing 24 Zheng officers, 5 ships, and killing over 200 enemies. Shi planned to attack Xiamen on 19 September, but the Qing court decided to postpone the assault until Dutch naval reinforcements arrived. From 18 to 20 November, the Dutch fought sea battles against the Zheng while Shi took Xiamen. In 1664, Shi assembled a fleet of 240 ships, and in conjunction with 16,500 troops, chased remaining Zheng forces south. They failed to dislodge the last Zheng stronghold due to the departure of the Dutch fleet. However, after the defection of Zheng commander Zhou Quanbin, Zheng Jing decided to pull out from the remaining mainland stronghold in the spring of 1664.

Shi was not content with just the defeat of Zheng forces on the mainland. He proposed to the Qing court an invasion of Penghu and Taiwan. In November 1664, Shi's fleet set sail but was turned back by a storm. He tried again in May 1665 but there was too little wind to move the ships and then a few days later the winds reversed direction and forced him to return. Another failed attempt was made in June when they were met with a violent storm, sinking a few small ships, and damaging the masts of several other ships. Shi's flagship was blown to the coast of Guangdong on 30 June. In 1666, the Qing called off the expedition.

== Preparations ==
Shi Lang was instructed to arrange the necessary ships, escorts, and provisions for a peace mission to Taiwan, but he did not believe Zheng Jing would accept the Qing's terms. He delivered a memorial to Beijing on 7 January 1668 and warned that if the Zhengs built up their strength, they would pose a serious danger. Shi detailed his plans to invade Taiwan with just 20,000 men and 170 battle ships. He required 10 new battle ships and 20 troop transports to be constructed. He argued that by securing Taiwan, the numerous garrisons along the coastline would be rendered unnecessary and reduce the defense spending.

After Kong Yuanzhang returned from his failed peace mission to Taiwan in 1667, he accused Shi of collusion with Zheng Jing. Shi was recalled from Fujian and his officers and soldiers were relocated to hinterland provinces. Some of them defected back to the Zhengs. The Fujian Naval Command was abrogated and Shi was given a leisurely post as one of the emperor's six grand guardsmen. Shi was not the only one who proposed more aggressive action against Taiwan. On 14 August 1668, Zhejiang official Shi Weiqi recommended imposing an economic blockade on Taiwan, which the Qing rejected.

The Fujian Naval Command was revived under Wang Zhiding on 9 January 1679 but Wang quit the job a few months later and admitted he was not suitable for the position. Wan Zhengse, who defected from the Zhengs in 1663, was appointed to replace Wang in May. Wan was opposed to an invasion of Taiwan and was adamant that such an attempt would end in failure. Wan's lack of confidence upset the Kangxi Emperor. In 1681, the Neo-Confucian scholar Li Guangdi recommended Shi Lang to be the coordinator of the invasion force. Shi was reappointed as the naval chief of Fujian on 10 September 1681. He assumed his duty in Xiamen on 15 November at the age of 61.

Admiral Shi's plan was to take Penghu first and then use it as a base to launch further operations. If the Zhengs did not surrender, Penghu would be used as a base for a Qing invasion into Taiwan. The Governor-general Yao Qisheng disagreed with Shi's plan to take Penghu first and proposed a two pronged attack on Tamsui and Penghu at the same time. Shi thought the proposal was unrealistic and requested to be put in total control over the entire invasion force. Kangxi denied the request.

In Taiwan, Zheng Jing's death resulted in a coup shortly afterward. His illegitimate son, Zheng Keshuang, murdered his brother Zheng Kezang with the support of minister Feng Xifan. Political turmoil, heavy taxes, an epidemic in the north, a large fire that caused the destruction of more than a thousand houses, and suspicion of collusion with the Qing caused more Zheng followers to defect to the Qing. Zheng's deputy Commander Liu Bingzhong surrendered with his ships and men from Penghu.

Orders from the Kangxi Emperor to invade Taiwan reached Yao Qisheng and Shi Lang on 6 June 1682. The invasion fleet was met with unfavorable winds and was forced to turn back. Yao proposed a five-month postponement of the invasion to wait for favorable winds in November. Conflict between Yao and Shi led to Yao's removal from power in November.

On 18 November 1682, Shi Lang was authorized to assume the role of supreme commander while Yao was relegated to logistical matters. Supplies arrived for Shi's 21,000 troops, 70 large warships, 103 supply ships, and 65 double mast vessels in early December. Spy ships were sent to scout Penghu and returned safely. Two attempts to sail to Penghu in February 1683 failed due to a shift in winds.

== Battle ==
Shi's fleet of 238 ships and over 21,000 men set sail on 8 July 1683. Liu Guoxuan, the commander of 30,000 men at Penghu, considered the movement a false alarm and believed Shi would turn back. The next day, Shi's fleet was sighted at small islands to the northwest of Penghu. The Qing forces were met by 200 Zheng ships. Following an exchange of gunfire, the Qing were forced to retreat with two Zheng naval commanders, Qiu Hui and Jiang Sheng, in pursuit. The Qing vanguard led by Admiral Lan Li provided cover fire for a withdrawal. Shi was hit in the right eye and Lan was wounded in the stomach during the fighting. The Zheng side also suffered heavy losses, making Liu reluctant to pursue the disarrayed Qing forces. He reported a "great victory" back to Taiwan.

On 11 July, Shi regrouped his squadrons and requested reinforcements at Bazhao. On 16 July, a reinforcement of large ships arrived. Shi divided the main striking force into eight squadrons of seven ships with himself leading from the middle. Two flotillas of 50 small ships sailed in two different directions as a diversion. The remaining vessels served as rear reinforcements.

The battle took place in the bay of Magong. The Zheng garrison fired at the Qing ships and then set sail from the harbor with about 100 ships to meet the Qing forces. Shi concentrated fire on one big enemy ship at a time until all of Zheng's battle ships were sunk by the end of 17 July. Liu escaped to Taiwan with dozens of small vessels. Approximately 12,000 Zheng men perished. The garrison commanders surrendered after hearing of Liu's escape. The Qing captured Penghu on 18 July.

== Aftermath ==
General He You, the chief commander of northern Taiwan, contacted Shi Lang with the intention of surrendering. Dong Teng, the commander of a Zheng fleet, followed suit. After his defeat at Penghu, Liu Guoxuan favored surrendering and convinced the Zheng government to send a peace mission to Penghu. On 26 August 1683, the 13-year old ruler Zheng Keshuang asked Zheng Dexiao to draft a petition of surrender. The first petition was rejected for its insistence on allowing Zheng Keshuang to stay in Taiwan. The second petition of surrender, bearing terms of unconditional surrender, arrived at Penghu on 5 September.

Shi Lang's party arrived in Taiwan on 5 October 1683 to supervise the surrender. No one was executed and the surrender went smoothly. Zheng Keshuang and other leaders shaved their heads in the Manchu style. Some Ming loyalists refused and chose death rather than to cut their hair but the majority accepted this change. The use of the Ming calendar, which the Zhengs had upheld for 38 years, was ended. A three-year tax exemption for all local inhabitants was proclaimed.

Zheng Keshuang was taken to Beijing, where he was ennobled by the Qing emperor as Duke of Hanjun (漢軍公); together with his family and leading officers, he was also inducted into the Eight Banners military system. Junior members of the House of Zheng acquired the hereditary style of Sia (舍). The Qing sent the 17 Ming princes still living on Taiwan back to mainland China where they spent the rest of their lives.

== See also ==
- Taiwan under Qing rule

== Bibliography ==
- Twitchett, Denis (2002), The Cambridge History of China 9 Volume 1
- Wong, Young-tsu (2017), China’s Conquest of Taiwan in the Seventeenth Century: Victory at Full Moon, Springer, ISBN 978-9811022470
