= Dwelling in the Fuchun Mountains =

Painting by Huang Gongwang

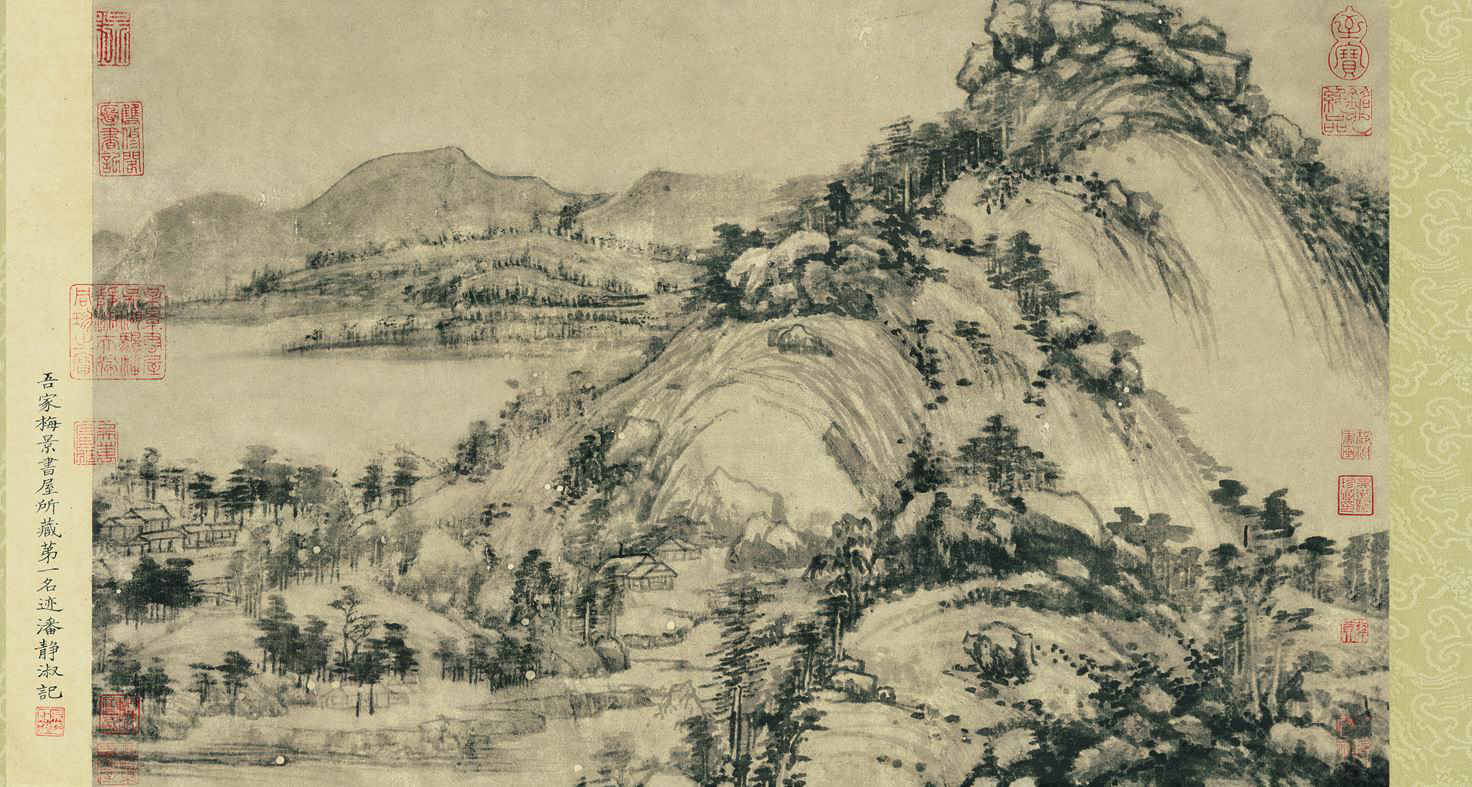
The first part of the Dwelling in the Fuchun Mountains, titled The Remaining Mountain, Zhejiang Provincial Museum in Hangzhou

Dwelling in the Fuchun Mountains (Chinese: 富春山居圖; pinyin: Fùchūnshān jū tú) is one of the few surviving works by Chinese painter Huang Gongwang (1269–1354) and is considered to be among his greatest works. Painted between 1348 and 1350, the painting was burnt into two pieces in 1650. Today, one piece is kept in the Zhejiang Provincial Museum in Hangzhou, while the other piece is kept in the National Palace Museum in Taipei. Put together, the entire painting would measure 691.3 centimetres (272.2 in) in length.

Technique	Wash painting
Support	Paper (scroll)
Size	31.8 by 51.4 centimetres (12.5 in × 20.2 in) (The Remaining Mountain); 33 by 636.9 centimetres (13.0 in × 250.7 in) (The Master Wuyong Scroll)

== Huang Gongwang and Fuchun Mountains ==
Dwelling in the Fuchun Mountains is considered one of the greatest surviving masterpieces by the highly acclaimed Chinese painter Huang Gongwang (1269–1354). He began serious studies in painting only at the age of 50. In 1347, he moved to the Fuchun Mountains (southwest of Hangzhou, along the northern bank of the Fuchun River), where he spent the last years of his life. There he made a number of paintings on the natural landscape, among them Dwelling in the Fuchun Mountains, which depicts the scenery in Fuyang, Hangzhou.

== History ==
=== Beginnings ===
It was "carefully designed and developed in layers of wet washes and brush strokes, giving a convincing appearance of offhand but inspired organisation and of spontaneous ink-play in detail"—two techniques with which Huang Gongwang is associated, later influencing such artists as Wang Yuanqi, one of the 'Six Masters of the Early Qing'. He presented it to a Taoist priest as a gift in 1350. A century later, the painting was somehow acquired by the Ming Dynasty painter Shen Zhou (1427–1509). During the reign of the Chenghua Emperor (1465–1487), Shen Zhou sent the painting to an unnamed calligrapher to be inscribed (a curious point considering Shen Zhou was an excellent calligrapher himself). However, the son of this calligrapher seized the painting which, after a few changes of hands, reemerged on the market being sold at a high price. Unable to afford the price, there was nothing Shen Zhou could do except to make a copy of the painting himself. This imitation by Shen Zhou has become the most well-known and acclaimed copy among all others.

Not long after he made the copy, Shen Zhou gave it to a bureaucrat friend named Fan Shunju (樊舜举). Fan Shunju then began to search for the authentic copy. When he found it, he bought it at a hefty price and invited Shen Zhou to inscribe on it. Shen Zhou then noted down at the end of the scroll the story of how the painting was lost and found.

Over the following centuries, the painting had come to know several owners, including Tan Zhiyi (谈志伊), Dong Qichang (董其昌) and Wu Zhengzhi (吴正志). When Wu Zhengzhi died, he passed the painting to his third son Wu Hongyu (吴洪裕), who loved the painting so much that when he went on refuge, he left behind all valuables and only brought the painting and a copy of the Thousand Character Classic by Master Zhiyong (智永法师). In fact, he was so fond of these two pieces of work that he had them burnt shortly before he died, so that he could bring them to the afterlife.

=== Separation into two parts ===
Wu Hongyu's nephew Wu Jing'an rescued the painting, which was however already aflame and torn into two. The smaller piece, also the beginning section, measuring 51.4 centimetres (20.2 in) long, was subsequently known as The Remaining Mountain (剩山圖). After passing through the hands of numerous collectors, it came to the possession of Wu Hufan (吴湖帆), painter and collector, during the 1940s. In 1956, it finally settled down in the Zhejiang Provincial Museum in Hangzhou.

The journey of the latter longer section, measuring 636.9 centimetres (250.7 in) long, known as The Master Wuyong Scroll (無用師卷), was perhaps more dramatic. It passed through the hands of several high-level government officials, including Gao Shiqi (高士奇) and Wang Hongxu (王鸿绪), before landing in the Imperial Palace. The Qianlong Emperor, who prided himself in his connoisseurship, judged that this new acquisition was counterfeit and insisted that the imitation he already possessed was authentic. This mistake was only corrected in 1816, during the reign of the Jiaqing Emperor. The longer piece was taken to Taiwan during the 1950s and is now at the National Palace Museum in Taipei.

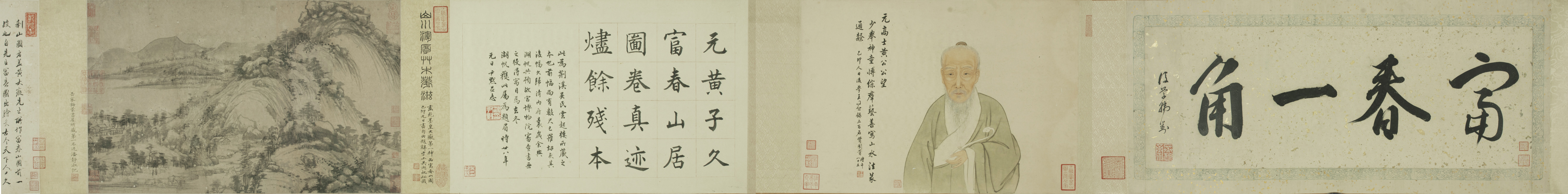
The first section of the painting, The Remaining Mountain, currently kept in the Zhejiang Provincial Museum in Hangzhou
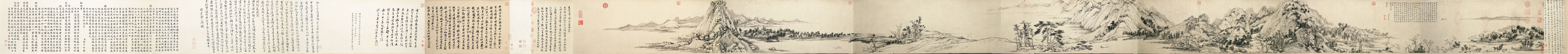
The second section, The Master Wuyong Scroll, currently kept in the National Palace Museum in Taipei

=== Joined after three and half centuries ===
In 2011, the first section of the painting was loaned to the National Palace Museum in Taipei where, in June and July, the two pieces were reunited for the first time since their separation more than three and a half centuries ago. The exhibition attracted 847,509 visitors and became one of the most popular art shows in 2011.

== Miscellaneous ==
- A number of private condominiums in China are named Fuchun Mountains Residence after the painting.

== In popular culture ==
In 2013's Chinese film Switch, the hero (Andy Lau) is tasked to recover the stolen painting.

Dwelling in the Fuchun Mountains, a 2019 Chinese film by Guo Xiaogang, was named after the painting.

The painting is also featured in the 2017 Chinese drama, Because of Meeting You. The show is centered around embroidery, and a scarf with the embroidered "Remaining Mountain" half of the painting plays an important role in the plot.
