= Zhang Yushu =

Chinese politician and scholar

Grand Secretary of the Wenhua Hall
- In office 1690–1711

Minister of Justice
- In office March 31, 1687 – March 20, 1688 Serving with Liaodan
- Preceded by: Hu Shengyou
- Succeeded by: Xu Qianxue

Minister of Rites
- In office January 1, 1689 – July 31, 1690 Serving with Gūbadai
- Preceded by: Xiong Cili
- Succeeded by: Zhang Ying

Personal details
- Born: July 22, 1642 Danfu, Jiangsu
- Died: July 2, 1711 (aged 68) Jehol

Zhang Yushu (Chinese: 張玉書; pinyin: Zhāng Yùshū; Wade–Giles: Chang Yü-shu, 22 July 1642 – 2 July 1711) was a Han Chinese politician and scholar in the Qing dynasty. He was one of the chief editors of the Kangxi Dictionary alongside Chen Tingjing.

== Biography ==
Zhang Yushu
- Traditional Chinese: 張玉書
- Simplified Chinese: 张玉书
Transcriptions
Standard Mandarin
- Hanyu Pinyin: Zhāng yùshū

Posthumous name
- Chinese: 文貞
Transcriptions
Standard Mandarin
- Hanyu Pinyin: Wénzhēn

A native of Dantu, Jiangsu, Zhang took the imperial examination and earned a jinshi degree in 1661. He appointed as a bachelor of the Hanlin Academy and was promoted to the rank of compiler three years later. He served in that role for the next twelve years before being made a tutor in the Imperial Academy. He was appointed director-general of the Historiographical Board in 1679 and tasked with helping compile the History of Ming with Ye Fang'ai and Xu Yuanwen.

He was promoted to expositor in the Hanlin Academy soon after and made a sub-chancellor in the Grand Secretariat in 1681. In 1684, he became vice-president of the Ministry of Rites and also served concurrently as chancellor of the Hanlin Academy. In the same year, his father died and he took retirement to mourn. In 1687, Zhang returned to government service to become Minister of Justice. He assumed the role of Minister of Rites two years later in 1689. During this time, he was posted to Gaoyao, Jiangsu, with Xiong Cili to inspect the river conservancy work there by Jin Fu. In 1690, Zhang became Grand Secretary of Wenhua Hall as well as Minister of Revenue. In 1696, Zhang travelled to Mongolia, joining the Kangxi Emperor in his expedition against Galdan. In 1697, alongside fellow grand secretaries Li Tianfu and Xiong Cili, he was made a director-general in charge of compiling the Pingding shuomo fang lüe (平定朔漠方略), an official account detailing the Qing military campaigns against the Dzungars. Zhang retired the following year to mourn his late mother, but returned to official life in 1700. He joined the emperor on his fourth tour of the south in 1703 and also travelled to Rehe with him in 1708, leaving behind a highly detailed account of the Kangxi Emperor's mountain estate there. Zhang's later career was spent directing the compilation of the Peiwen Yunfu and the Kangxi Dictionary. He died in 1711 whilst accompanying the emperor on a trip to Jehol. Zhang was honoured with posthumous name Wenzhen (文貞) and his name was included in the Temple of Eminent Statesmen during the reign of Yongzheng.
