= A Pillow Case of Mystery =

- Promotional poster
- Also known as: The Curious Cases of Lord Sze
- 施公奇案
- Genre: Costume drama Detective fiction Fantasy
- Written by: Lau Chi-wah
- Starring: Bobby Au-yeung; Kenix Kwok; Benny Chan; Tavia Yeung; Annie Man; Lo Hoi-pang
- Opening theme: "Sin Chi Sin Kok" (先知先覺) by Benny Chan
- Country of origin: Hong Kong
- Original language: Cantonese
- No. of episodes: 20

Production
- Executive producer: Lam Chi-wah
- Production location: Hong Kong
- Camera setup: Multi camera
- Running time: 42 – 45 minutes
- Production company: TVB

Original release
- Network: TVB Jade
- Release: 31 January – 26 February 2006

Related
- A Pillow Case of Mystery II (2010)

A Pillow Case of Mystery (Traditional Chinese: 施公奇案; literally The Curious Cases of Lord Sze) is a 2006 Hong Kong detective-fantasy television drama starring Bobby Au-yeung as the title character, Mr. Sze (Sze Sai-lun). Produced by Lam Chi-wah and edited by Lau Chi-wah, the drama is a TVB production. The original broadcast was on the TVB Jade network with 45-minute episodes airing five days a week from 31 January to 26 February 2006. The drama is set during the early 19th century Qing dynasty. Sze Sai-lun, the newly appointed magistrate of Kong-do County, accidentally encounters a spirit, enclosed in a magic pillow, who helps him solve cases.

Due to the drama's popular success, a follow-up sequel, A Pillow Case of Mystery II was produced and was released in 2010.

== Premise ==
Sze Sai-lun (Bobby Au-yeung) becomes the new magistrate of Kong-do County. After a series of unresolved cases, the townspeople begin to see him as pathetic and useless. While Sai-lun was searching for evidence by a hillside, he accidentally injures himself, dropping blood on a mysterious pillow. He faints on it and discovers that the pillow encloses a spirit (Lo Hoi-pang) who can help him solve mysteries by giving him clues and riddles to solve. With the help of the pillow spirit, the townspeople begin to see a new light in Sai-lun.

== Cast and characters ==
=== Main characters ===
Cast	Role	Description
Bobby Au-yeung	Sze Sai-lun	Kong-do County's new magistrate
Kenix Kwok	Mai Heung-yung	the county court's maiden. born Tong Fung
Benny Chan	Wong Tin-bah	born Tong Lung; Heung-yung's feisty younger brother.
Tavia Yeung	Princess Tsanggak Ming-chu	Sai-lun's younger god-sister.
Lo Hoi-pang	Tong Doh-fuk	later revealed to be Heung-yung and Tin-bah's dead grandfather. Pillow Spirit

=== Other characters ===
Cast	Role	Description
Lee Fung	Chiu Yuet-ngor	Sai-lun's mother.
Rosanne Lui	Pong Got-ngoi	Sai-lun's official wife.
Eileen Yeow	Ka Sau-yuk	Sai-lun's second wife/concubine.
Annie Man	Chin Lai-shu	Sai-lun's third wife/concubine.
Gordon Liu	Sima Jui-fung	the head constable.
Mary Hon	Siu Kau-leung	Heung-yung and Tin-bah's foster mother.
Cheung Ying-choi	Assistant Lo	Sai-lun's assistant judge.
Lee Kwok-lun	Sze Long	Sai-lun's deceased father.

== Viewership ratings ==
	Week	Episode	Average points	Peaking points	HK viewers (in millions)	References
1	January 31 — February 3, 2006	1 — 4	28	31	1.78	
2	February 6 — 10, 2006	5 — 9	32	35	2.04	
3	February 13 — 17, 2006	10 — 14	31	—	1.98	
4	February 20 — 24, 2006	15 — 19	32	—	2.04	
4	February 26, 2006	20	36	38	2.29	
