= Wang Hongxu =

Qing dynasty politician

Minister of Works
- In office June 22, 1699 – June 26, 1708
- Preceded by: Xiong Yixiao
- Succeeded by: Wang Jie

Minister of Revenue
- In office May 22, 1708 – March 4, 1709
- Preceded by: Xu Chao
- Succeeded by: Zhang Penghe

Personal details
- Born: September 22, 1645 Huating, Jiangsu
- Died: September 14, 1723 Beijing, Zhili

Wang Hongxu (Chinese: 王鴻緖; pinyin: Wáng hóngxù; Wade–Giles: Wang Hung-hsü, 22 September 1645 – 14 September 1723) was a Han Chinese official, historian, and calligrapher during the Qing dynasty who frequently served as a personal spy for the Kangxi Emperor.

== Biography ==
Born in Huating, Jiangsu, Wang took the imperial examination in 1673 and earned a jinshi degree with the banyan distinction. He was appointed a compiler in the Hanlin Academy soon after. He served in a variety of appointments at the imperial court and in educational posts in the provinces before being made one of the chief editors of the History of Ming in 1682 with Tang Bin and Xu Qianxue. However, he was forced to retire in 1689 after being accused by the censor Guo Xiu of colluding with Gao Shiqi and others in the taking of bribes. Wang nevertheless returned as co-director in charge of compiling the History of Ming in 1694.

He took on positions of increasing responsibility, becoming Minister of Works in 1699 and then Minister of Revenue in 1708. Wang also became highly trusted by the emperor; he served as his personal spy, submitting secret memorials about other officials. The Kangxi Emperor even trusted him to investigate his own son, Crown Prince Yunreng, who was alleged, among a litany of other crimes, to have been involved in the trafficking of children in the Suzhou area. However, Wang soon became embroiled in the factionalism between the Kangxi Emperor's sons over the succession to the throne in the late 1700s. He supported Maci's position regarding Yunsi's succession to the throne and was forced to retire in 1709. In retirement, Wang continued working on the History of Ming and submitted his work to the throne in 1714. He was recalled to Beijing to do editorial work the following year. Wang continued adding to his drafts of the History of Ming, heavily plagiarising many other historians in the process, including Wan Sitong. He submitted this draft to the throne before he died in 1723 in Beijing.
