= Shi Shilun =

- 施世綸

Personal details
- Born: 1659 Zhizhou, Taizhou, Jiangsu, Qing Empire
- Died: July 3, 1722 (aged 62–63) Fujian, Qing Empire
- Resting place: Xutian Village, Huangtang Town, Hui'an County, Fujian, Qing Empire
- Parent: Shi Lang (father)
- Occupation: official
- Other names: Shi Gong; Shi Qingtian

Military service
- Allegiance: Qing dynasty
- Branch/service: Bordered Yellow Banner

Shi Shilun (施世綸, 1659 – July 3, 1722), popularly known as Shi Gong (施公; "Lord Shi") or Qingtian (施青天; "Clear-Sky Shi"), was a much-praised Qing dynasty official during the Kangxi Emperor's reign. He was the son of general Shi Lang.

== In popular culture ==
He appears in a 19th century, fictionalized gong'an (crime fiction) story, as a central character in The Cases of Lord Shi (施公案). Subsequently, many operas also featured him as a central character.

Fictional television series featuring him as the central protagonist include:

- The Great Arbitrator (大執法), a 1983 Taiwanese TV series starring Tsui Hao-jan as Shi.
- The Strange Cases of Lord Shih (施公奇案), a 1997 Taiwanese TV series starring Liao Chun as Shi.
- A Pillow Case of Mystery (施公奇案), a 2006 Hong Kong TV series starring Bobby Au-yeung as Shi.
  - A Pillow Case of Mystery II (施公奇案II), a 2010 Hong Kong TV series again starring Au-yeung.
- Chinese Sherlock Shi (新施公案), a 2013 Chinese TV series starring Fan Ming as Shi.

In addition, the 1987 Chinese martial arts film Golden Dart Hero (金鏢黃天霸) is also based on some stories from The Cases of Lord Shi, although the film portrays Shi Shilun in a negative light.
