= Yao Qisheng =

Hereditary Adaha hafan Yao Qisheng 姚啟聖
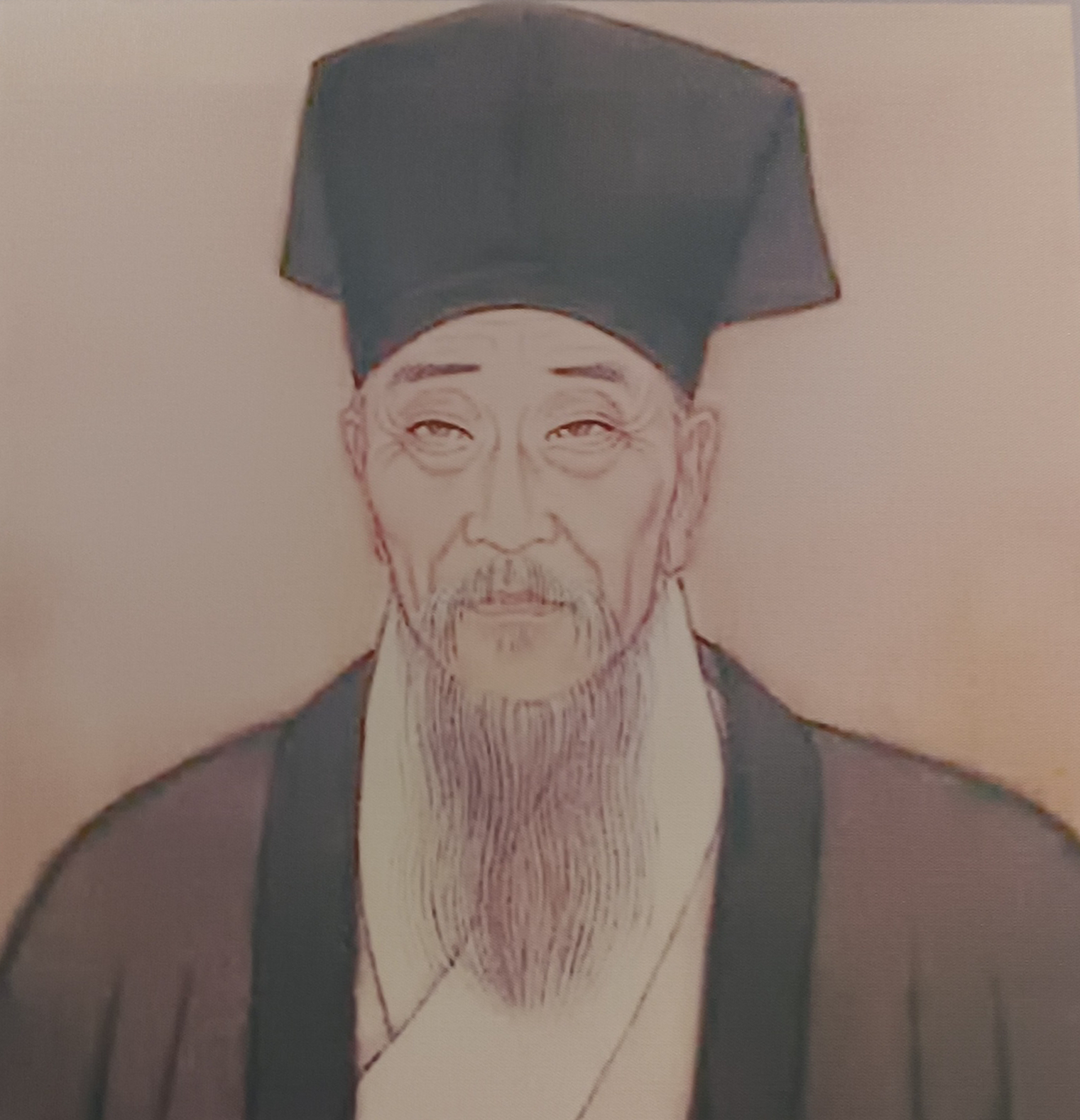

Viceroy of Fujian
- In office 1678–1683
- Preceded by: Lang Tingzuo
- Succeeded by: Shi Weihan

Personal details
- Born: 1623 Shaoxing, Zhejiang, Ming China
- Died: 1683 (aged 59–60) Qing China

Military service
- Allegiance: Qing dynasty
- Branch/service: Han Chinese Bordered Red Banner
- Rank: General

Yao Qisheng (simplified Chinese: 姚启圣; traditional Chinese: 姚啟聖; pinyin: Yáo Qǐshèng; 1624–1683), courtesy name Xizhi (Chinese: 熙止; pinyin: Xīzhǐ), was a Chinese regional official, diplomat, and statesman during the reign of the Kangxi Emperor in the Qing dynasty. Yao was a pivotal figure in the Qing empire's annexation of Taiwan.

== Biography ==
Yao was born in the Shaoxing area of the southeastern Zhejiang province during the waning years of the Ming dynasty. About 1640 at age 20, while travelling in northern China, he reputedly killed two Qing soldiers who were trying to rape a girl, and returned the girl to her family, earning him fame as a righteous figure in local lore. Due to having been wronged by some northern Chinese rich merchants, he joined the Qing army as a means to exact revenge. In 1663, Yao scored first in the local Civil Service Examinations, and became the county magistrate of Xiangshan County in Guangdong. In Xiangshan, Yao was known to have cleaned up finances of the local bureaucracy, which was mired in debt under his predecessor. However, several years later he was removed from the position, for unknown reasons, and returned to Zhejiang.

In 1674, Yao, along with his son, raised a small army of several hundred men to assist Giyesu, the Prince Kang, in the fight against Geng Jingzhong, who had revolted against Manchu rule.

On recommendation from Giyesu, Yao became entrusted by the Kangxi Emperor, who eventually appointed him Viceroy of Fujian during a campaign against Ming Dynasty loyalists on Taiwan under the leadership of Zheng Jing. Yao led Qing forces to several victories on the Fujian coast, eventually forcing Zheng to retreat to the island of Taiwan proper.

Yao repeatedly attempted to negotiate a peaceful surrender of Zheng Jing's forces in Taiwan. Eventually, Yao proposed to the emperor that Taiwan take on the "Korean model" of a suzerain nation, maintaining broad autonomy over its own affairs and allowing its citizens to maintain their Han Chinese hairstyle instead of growing a Manchu queue. However, the Kangxi Emperor rejected this proposal.

In his later years, Yao was appointed a Shangshu (roughly, "Secretary") of the Board of War. However, he became involved in a bitter struggle for control of the imperial forces with former Ming loyalist and defector Shi Lang, who had also become a trusted military officer of the Kangxi emperor, and who steadfastly refused to submit to Yao's oversight. Shi eventually conquered Taiwan, and was given grand imperial honours by the emperor upon his victory, but Yao was apparently not credited. Deeply enraged with what he saw as a slight, Yao fell ill, and died shortly thereafter.

Yao was married to a woman surnamed He, who was supposedly revered for her physical strength. They had one known son.

Yao is buried in present-day town of Lizhu (漓渚镇), in the Keqiao District of Shaoxing. In 2015, the local government renovated the burial grounds to make the site more visible, and also erected an engraved stone tablet to describe Yao's achievements, possibly to generate tourist revenue.

== Popular culture ==
Yao Qisheng appears in the Chinese TV series Kangxi Dynasty.

== See also ==
- Shi Lang
- Battle of Penghu

Government offices
Preceded by Lang Tingxiang	Viceroy of Fujiang; 1678–1683	Succeeded by Shi Weihan
