= A Pillow Case of Mystery II =

Hong Kong television series

- Official poster
- Also known as: The Curious Cases of Lord Sze II
- 施公奇案 II
- Genre: Costume drama Detective fiction Fantasy
- Written by: Lee Yee-wah; Choi Suk-yin
- Starring: Bobby Au-yeung; Jessica Hsuan; Johnson Lee; Leila Tong; Joel Chan
- Theme music composer: Yip Siu-chung
- Opening theme: "Bit Tai Koo Ngor" (別低估我) by Wong Cho-lam
- Country of origin: Hong Kong
- Original language: Cantonese
- No. of episodes: 20

Production
- Executive producer: Lam Chi-wah
- Production location: Hong Kong
- Camera setup: Multi camera
- Running time: 42 – 45 minutes
- Production company: TVB

Original release
- Network: TVB Jade
- Release: 12 July – 7 August 2010

Related
- A Pillow Case of Mystery (2006)

A Pillow Case of Mystery II
- Title screen shot
- Traditional Chinese: 施公奇案II
- Simplified Chinese: 施公奇案II
- Literal meaning: "The Curious Cases of Lord Sze II"
Transcriptions
Standard Mandarin
- Hanyu Pinyin: Shī Gōng Qí An II
Yue: Cantonese
- Jyutping: Ji6 Gung1 Kei4 On3 ll

A Pillow Case of Mystery II (Traditional Chinese: 施公奇案II; literally The Curious Cases of Lord Sze II) is a 2010 Hong Kong detective-fantasy television drama starring Bobby Au-yeung as the title character, Mr. Sze (Sze Sai-lun).

Produced by Lam Chi-wah and edited by Lee Yee-wah and Choi Suk-yin, the drama is a direct sequel to A Pillow Case of Mystery. The original broadcast for this sequel was on the TVB Jade network with 45-minute episodes airing five days a week from 31 January to 6 August 2010. The two-hour finale was aired on Saturday, 7 August 2010.

== Synopsis ==
After a radical change in life, Sze Sai-lun becomes dispirited with the political world and spends most of his time travelling around in search of fun. Along the way, he meets a spirit medium, Ng Kwan-yau, who somehow gets caught up in a mysterious murder case. With fortuitous assistance from the pillow spirit Ngau Tai-lik, he is able to crack the case and prove Kwan-yau’s innocence. Sai-lun has his confidence back and pledges to continue his fight for justice. As time progresses, Sai-lun and Kwan-yau get to know each other better and gradually fall in love. Sai-lun finally decides to get over the past and marry the girl. He enjoys his married life so much but gets frustrated at work sometimes - Tai-lik’s power turns out not to be as strong as expected, which ends up with a lot of misleading clues being given. Amidst the various challenges of his new life, Sai-lun realizes that Kwan-yau seems to have something to hide and that there is a malicious plot behind their marriage. Knowing that the couple have fallen out, Sai-lun’s mother has found him a new wife, Luk Siu-tip. Out of the blue, Siu-tip has also come with ill intentions. Sai-lun is plunged into a complex web of intrigue and things seem to be getting on top of him...

== Cast and characters ==
=== Main characters ===
| Cast | Role | Description |
|---|---|---|
| Bobby Au-yeung | Magistrate Sze Sai-lun | Sin-yau County's new magistrate. |
| Jessica Hsuan | Ng Kwan-yau | a con artist. Magistrate Sze Sai-lun's 5th wife. Gave birth in the final episode. |
| Joel Chan | So Ying-chun | the son of the Eighth Prince. born Guuwalgiya Jinchun |
| Leila Tong | Ting Mei-yan | the daughter of General Ting. Magistrate Sze Sai-lun's 6th wife. |
| Johnson Lee | Ngau Tai-lik | later revealed to be, a castrated man, from the Ngau village. the new Pillow Spirit |

=== Recurring characters ===
| Cast | Role | Description |
|---|---|---|
| Lee Fung | Chiu Yuet-ngor | Sai-lun's mother. |
| Rosanne Lui | Pong Got-ngoi | Sai-lun's official wife. |
| Eileen Yeow | Ka Sau-yuk | Sai-lun's second wife/concubine. |
| Gordon Liu | Szema Jui-fung | the head constable. |
| Law Ho-kai | Ng Sau-shun | Kwan-yau's uncle and owner of the Dragon Phoenix Inn. |
| Cha Cha Chan | Tit Kim-lan | an employee at Dragon Phoenix Inn. |
| Alex Lam | Chukot Leung | an employee at Dragon Phoenix Inn. |
| Wi Kar Hung | Golden-haired Rat | an employee at Dragon Phoenix Inn. |
| Dai Yiu-ming | Assistant Lui Ming | Sai-lun's assistant judge. |
| Cilla Kung | Ting Ting | Mei-yan's younger cousin. |
| Luk Wing-chi | Ng Hei-lam | Ng Kwan-yu's six-year-old daughter. |

=== Other characters ===
==== The swordfish murder case ====
| Cast | Role |
| Kwong Chor-fai | Magistrate Yeung; Villain |
| Ngai Wai-man | Chan Dai-kwan; Villain |
| Wong Man-piu | Constable Chu |

==== The undergarment theft case ====
| Cast | Role |
| Lily Liu | Miss Fa |
| Choi Hau-lam | Ngang Ngang |
| Tsui Man-ching | Yin Yin |
| Annie Wong | Kiu Kiu |
| Yaka Fu | Yim Yim |
| Leo Tsang | Tong Yan |

==== The painting theft case ====
| Cast | Role |
| Wong Wai-tak | Fung Chi-hoi |
| June Chan | Sin Ying |

==== The drama murder case ====
| Cast | Role |
| Raymond Tsang | Ng Kwan-yu |
| Rachel Kan | Ling Lung |
| Kwok Dak-shun | Hung Wuen-tong |
| Lee Kai-kit | Fan Siu-sau; Villain |
| Cheung Dat-lun | Yim Bak-sang |
| Lam Yuen-ying | Au-yeung Hon |

==== The family genocide case ====
| Cast | Role |
| Law Lok-lam | General Ting Yan-chuen |
| Suet Nei | Wong Seung |
| Chalk North | Chik Yiu-tin; Villain |
| Lee Chi-kei | Lo Yau-choi |
| Elton Loo | Lo Dat |
| Wong Ching | Lo Shu-gan |

==== The serial rapist murder case ====
| Cast | Role |
| Cheng Ka-sang | Kot Fei; Villain |
| Ma Tai-lo | Tin Siu-tung |
| Lai Sau-ying | Grandma Kam |
| Wong Tsun-san | Lam Gau |

==== Pillow spirit and Mystery Bay case ====
| Cast | Role |
| Rain Lau | Princess Mucideri Yanxian; Main villain |
| Henry Lee | Samala Acai; Semi-villain. Committed suicide. |
| Lee Kong-lung | Eunuch Lo; Villain killed Ng Mau-Dan and caused the shipwreck that killed Mai Heung Yung and Chin Lai shu. Killed by Princess Mucideri Yanxian. |
| Yoyo Chen | Princess Qianqian |
| Queena Chan | Ng Mau-dan. Samala Acai's mistress. |

== Viewership ratings ==
| | Week | Episodes | Average points | Peaking points | HK viewers (in millions) | References |
|---|---|---|---|---|---|---|
| 1 | July 12–16, 2010 | 1 — 5 | 30 | 36 | 1.91 | |
| 2 | July 19–22, 2010 | 6 — 9 | 32 | 37 | 2.03 | |
| 3 | July 26–30, 2010 | 10 — 14 | 31 | 39 | 1.98 | |
| 4 | August 2–6, 2010 | 15 — 19 | 31 | — | 1.98 | |
| 4 | August 7, 2010 | 20 | 34 | 37 | 2.17 | |

== Awards and nominations ==
=== TVB Anniversary Awards 2010 ===
- Nominated: Best Drama
- Nominated: Best Actor (Bobby Au Yeung)
- Nominated: Best Actress (Jessica Hsuan)
