= Peiwen Yunfu =

Chinese rime dictionary

The Peiwen Yunfu (simplified Chinese: 佩文韵府; traditional Chinese: 佩文韻府; pinyin: Pèiwén Yùnfǔ; Wade–Giles: P'ei-wen Yün-fu; lit. 'rime storehouse of esteemed phrases') is a 1711 Chinese rime dictionary of literary allusions and poetic dictions. Collated by tone and rime, the dictionary serves the composition of poetry.

Like the Kangxi dictionary, the Peiwen Yunfu was compiled under the patronage of the Kangxi Emperor, whose imperial library was named Peiwen ("esteem/admire writing/phrases/literature"). He believed that previous Chinese dictionaries of multiple-character phrases, including the Yuan Dynasty Yunfu qunyu (韻府群玉) and the Ming Dynasty Wuche yunrui (五車韻瑞), were incomplete and sometimes erroneous. Over twenty editors, including Zhang Yushu (張玉書, 1642–1711) and Chen Tingjing (陳廷敬, 1638–1712), began the compilation in 1704 and finished in 1711. In 1716, the emperor ordered the creation of a supplement, the Yunfu shiyi (韻府拾遺), which was completed in 1720.

The Peiwen yunfu is a large dictionary (212 卷 "volumes; fascicles") of two-, three-, and four-character idioms. It contains roughly 560,000 items under 10,257 entries arranged by 106 rhymes. Classical allusions and phrases are classified under the rhyme of their last character, with numerous quotations given to illustrate usage.

Although the Peiwen yunfu, which James Legge calls the "Kangxi Thesaurus", is less famous than the Kangxi dictionary, it can be helpful in tracing literary usages. "Whenever names or phrases are met with which are not understood," say Teng and Biggerstaff, "this is the first work which should be consulted."

== See also ==
- Chinese dictionary
- Qieyun
- Guangyun
- Jiyun
