= Eileen Yeow =

Singaporean actress

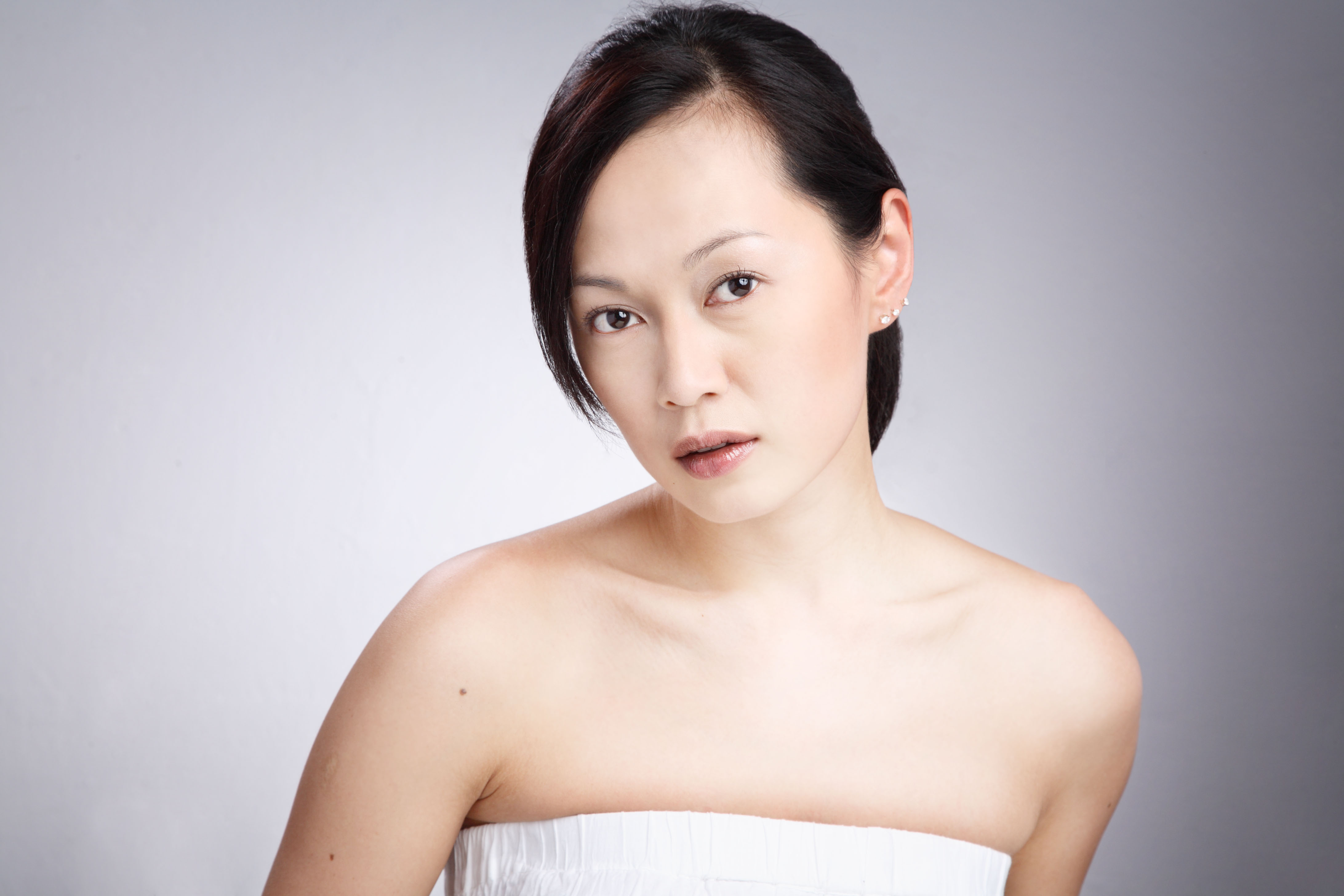
- Yeow at a fashion shoot in 2006
- Born: 4 January 1972 (age 54); Singapore
- Occupation: Actress
- Years active: 1997–present
- Children: 1

Chinese name
- Traditional Chinese: 姚瑩瑩
- Simplified Chinese: 姚莹莹
Transcriptions
Standard Mandarin
- Hanyu Pinyin: Yáo Yíngyíng
Yue: Cantonese
- Jyutping: Yiu4 Jing4-jing4

Eileen Yeow (born 4 January 1972), also known as Yiu Ying-ying, is a Hongkonger-Singaporean actress and beauty pageant titleholder. She was named as one of the "Five Fresh Beauties" of TVB in 1995.

== Career ==
Yeow won the title of Miss Singapore Universe 1991. After that, she went on to represent Singapore in the Miss Universe 1991 pageant in Las Vegas, United States. Her best friend, Anita Yuen, then encouraged her to expand her acting career in Hong Kong. She then went to Hong Kong and became an actress. In 2013 she appeared in the film Blind Detective which was featured at the Cannes Film Festival.

== Personal life ==
Yeow was born in Singapore.

In June 2011, she gave birth to a boy, Evan, with her boyfriend of 8 years. She said she didn't plan to get married and would deal with love life in a low-key manner.

== Filmography ==
=== TV series ===
Year	Title	Role	Notes/Ref.
1996	The Criminal Investigator II	Yeung Yin-ping	
1996	Outburst	Brenda	
1997	Detective Investigation Files III	Fong Lim-ching	
1997	File of Justice V	Eva Chiu Lai-ying	
1998	Secret of the Heart	Apple Ko Nga-man	
1998	Crimes of Passion		
1999	Detective Investigation Files IV	Gigi Siu Chi-nam	
1999	Witness to a Prosecution	Nam Choi-dip	
1999	Untraceable Evidence II	Fok Wai-si	
1999	A Loving Spirit	Ho Yun-kwan	
2000	Armed Reaction II	Sham Kiu	
2000	Lost In Love	Tong Yik-shu	
2001	A Step into the Past	Lady Chu	
2002	A Herbalist Affair	Fong Kow	
2003	The 'W' Files	Yu Fa / Chuen-To Fa-Tsi	
2004	The Vigilante in the Mask	Au-Yeung Fong Si	
2005	Wars of In-Laws		
2006	A Pillow Case of Mystery	Ga Sau-yuk	
2007	Wars of In-Laws II		
2008	Last One Standing	Sandy Lei Pui-shan	
2009	The Winter Melon Tale	Lee Oi	
2009	The Threshold of a Persona	Hon So-ching	
2009	Off Pedder	Miss Chong	
2009	Born Rich	Wendy Leung Wan Yee	
2009	A Chip Off the Old Block	Chiu Mao Dan	
2010	The Season of Fate	Ah Wan	
2010	In the Eye of the Beholder	Lei Yuk Giu	
2010	A Fistful of Stances	Hau Ho-fa	
2010	A Pillow Case of Mystery II	Ga Sau-yuk	
2010	Beauty Knows No Pain	Mrs. Kam	
2010	Every Move You Make	Ng Mei-yu	
2010	No Regrets	Wong Lee Yuk-king	
2010	Show Me the Happy	Mrs. Lam	
2011	The Rippling Blossom	Yoshiho Tin	
2012	Highs and Lows	Chu Lai Ha	
2013	Come Home Love	Amanda Lau Sheung-ho	
2013	Missing You	Mami	
2014	Tomorrow Is Another Day		
2015	Smooth Talker	Wu Yiu Bik-san	
2016	Speed of Life	Margaret Chiu Kei-tse	
2016	The Last Healer in Forbidden City	To's elder sister	
2016	Presumed Accidents	Ida Tang Oi-gwan	
2016	Inspector Gourmet	Mrs. Ma	
2017	The No No Girl	Law Lai-chi	
2017	Come Home Love: Lo and Behold	Helen Shum Kai Yi	
2018	The Forgotten Valley	Mrs Fen Sao	
2018	Watch Out, Boss	Xu Tang Jiahui	
2018	Who Wants A Baby	Ma Tianna	
2018	OMG, Your Honour	Mrs Lei	
2018	Wife Interrupted	唐戴韻萍	
