= Shi Lang =

Chinese naval officer (1621–1696)

Marquis Jinghai Shi Lang
- 施琅
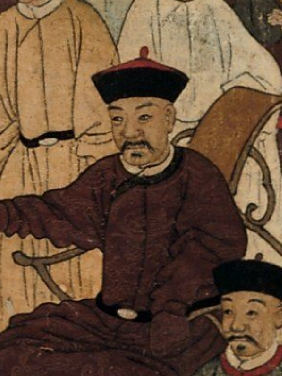
- Shi Lang in the company of high-ranking officials
- Born: March 7, 1621; Jinjiang, Quanzhou, Fujian, Ming dynasty
- Died: April 22, 1696 (aged 75); Fujian, Qing dynasty
- Burial place: Shi Lang Tomb, Hui'an County, Quanzhou, Fujian, Qing dynasty
- Spouse(s): Lady Wang; Lady Huang
- Children: Shi Shihui; Shi Shilun; Shi Shiliu; Shi Shiji; Shi Shiqi; Shi Shihui; Shi Shihua; Shi Shifan
- Relatives: Shi Daxuan (father)
- Military career
- Allegiance: Qing dynasty
- Branch: Bordered Yellow Banner
- Conflicts: Battle of Penghu

Chinese name
- Chinese: 施琅
Transcriptions
Standard Mandarin
- Hanyu Pinyin: Shī Láng
- Wade–Giles: Shih Lang
Southern Min
- Hokkien POJ: Si Lông

Shi Lang (March 7, 1621– April 22, 1696), Marquis Jinghai, also known as Secoe or Sego, was a Chinese admiral who served under the Ming and Qing dynasties in the 17th century. He was the commander-in-chief of the Qing fleets which destroyed the power of Zheng Chenggong's descendants in the 1660s, and led the conquest of the Zheng family's Kingdom of Tungning in Taiwan in 1683. Shi later governed part of Taiwan as a marquis.

== Early life and career ==
Shi was born to a distinguished lineage in Fujian, in 1621. He studied military strategy in his youth, and became particularly proficient in naval warfare. Known for his strength, ferocity and martial skills in battle, Shi was described as a fierce warrior who was also highly adept in military command skills by the Kangxi Emperor. However, he was a blunt and rude person who lacked basic manners and courtesy. After fighting a number of minor operations locally with his father, he joined Zheng Zhilong's naval fleet as captain of the left vanguard. Shi served most of the early 1640s in the Zheng family's fleet, where he apparently saw some conflict with Zheng Zhilong's son Koxinga. After a personal dispute, Koxinga killed Shi's father, brother and son, causing Shi to defect to the Qing dynasty for the second time in 1646.

== Campaign against the Zheng family ==
The Qing rulers prized Shi for his extensive naval experience and his network of contacts in the major trading ports of East Asia. He accompanied Prince Jidu (son of Jirgalang) on an expedition in Fujian in 1656, and attained the rank of Assistant Brigadier-General. In the campaign of 1663 against the Zheng family, he commanded Dutch ships and men to follow up the Qing victories. In 1668, he submitted a plan to drive the remnants of the Ming dynasty from Taiwan and the Pescadores (Penghu), but the proposal was not utilised. He was given a post in the Imperial Bodyguard and attached to the Chinese Bordered Yellow Banner.

== Conquest of Taiwan ==
In 1681, following the Revolt of the Three Feudatories, the Kangxi Emperor sought a possible leader for an amphibious operation against Taiwan. Following the advice of Li Guangdi, Shi was chosen. Shi insisted on having an independent command, not one shared with Yao Qisheng, the Governor-General of Fujian. On 8 July 1683, after extensive preparation, Shi led a force of 300 warships and 20,000 soldiers out of Tongshan, Fujian. On July 16–17, he defeated the Zheng family's leading naval commander, Liu Guoxuan, in a major engagement near the Pescadores. On 5 September, Shi received Zheng Keshuang's offer to surrender. On 3 October, he reached Taiwan and formally obtained the capitulation of Liu Guoxuan and Zheng Keshuang.

Following this successful campaign, Shi returned to mainland China and worked hard to persuade the Emperor to make Taiwan part of China's recognized territory. At the time, there was opposition among many within the Qing government toward the annexation of Taiwan, arguing that its maintenance would become an economic burden on the empire. However, the Emperor accepted Shi's views, and in 1684 Taiwan was divided into three counties and established as a prefecture of Fujian province.

Shi was declared the "General Who Maintains Peace on the Seas" (靖海將軍) and given the hereditary rank of marquis. At his own request, he was specially granted the privilege of wearing an honorary peacock feather. Shi continued at his post in Fujian, seizing almost half of the developed land in southern Taiwan for his own profit. Shi annually extorted monetary resources from rich and poor local communities alike, and instituted policies that deliberately aimed to isolate Taiwan from the rest of the Qing Empire – coastal provinces were forbidden to interact with Taiwan, and even people from inland provinces were disallowed to bring their families with them, effectively preventing them from making any permanent foothold in Taiwan. Although he was later charged with arrogance, in 1688 the Kangxi Emperor received Shi in audience in Beijing and allowed him to sit in the imperial presence, reiterating his confidence in him. Shi returned to Fujian and remained in office there until his death in 1696.

== Legacy ==
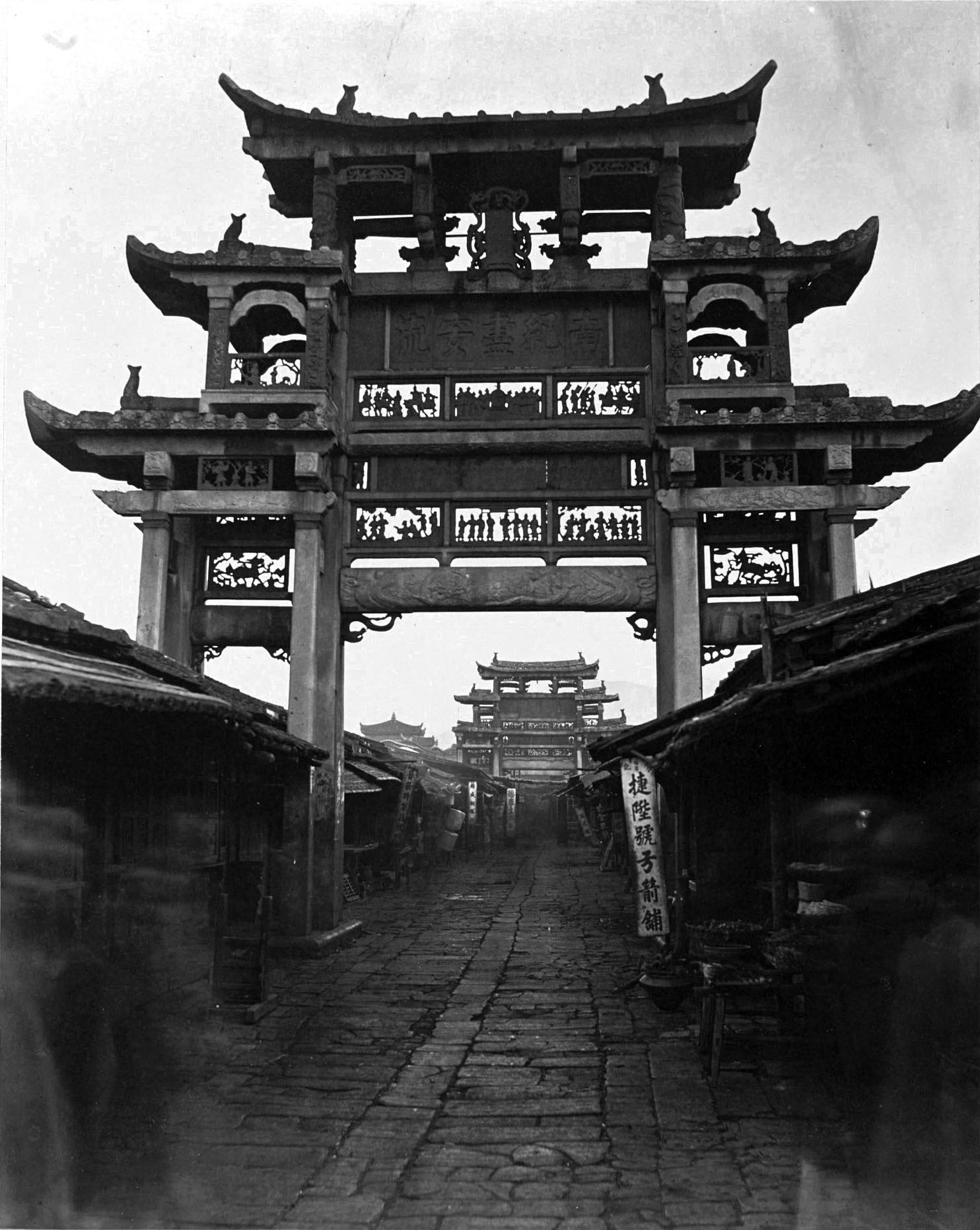
Paifang in Quanzhou in memory of Shi Lang. (taken between 1860 and 1880)

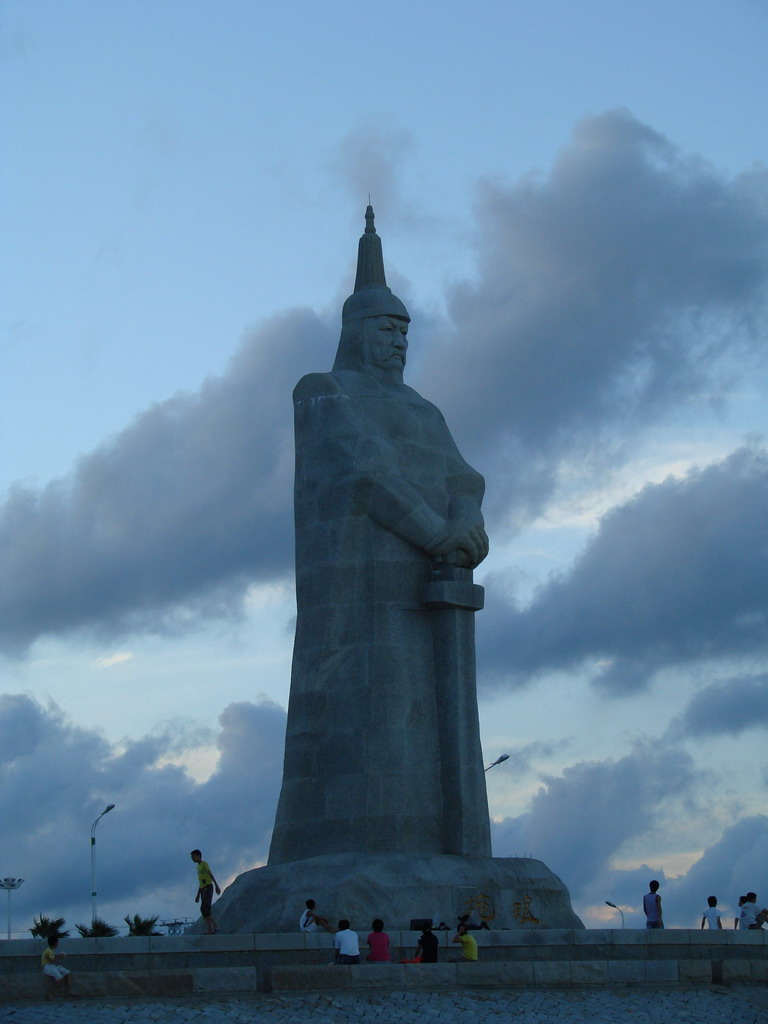
Statue in Jinjiang, Fujian depicting Shi Lang

Shi was given the posthumous name "Xiangzhuang" (襄壮), and the title of Junior Tutor to the Heir Apparent. In 1732, his name was entered for worship in the Temple of Eminent Statesmen. One of his sons achieved distinction as an admiral, whilst another was a state official. The Shi family was granted the special privilege of burial in their ancestral cemetery in Jinjiang, instead of in Banner lands as was the case with other Bannermen.

Though famous for his military achievements, Shi remains a controversial figure in contemporary China. He is generally denounced as a traitorous figure who abandoned the Ming loyalist cause for the Qing. As a defector, his exploits have generally been downplayed by the governments of both Taiwan and China, and he is remembered in Taiwan as a conqueror and cruel governor.

== In popular culture ==
Shi appears as a minor character in the wuxia novel The Deer and the Cauldron by Louis Cha. In the novel, the Kangxi Emperor ordered Shi to assist the protagonist Wei Xiaobao in destroying the Mystic Dragon Cult. The Battle of Penghu, in which Shi led the Qing navy to victory over the forces of the Kingdom of Tungning, is also mentioned in the later chapters.

== See also ==
- Shi Shilun, Shi Lang's son
