= Ye Fang'ai =

Qing-era Chinese official (1629–1682)

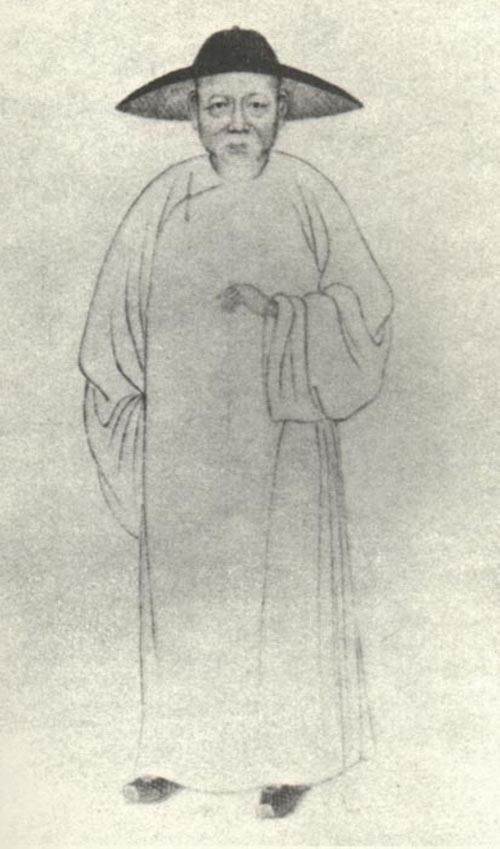
Ye Fang'ai

Ye Fang'ai (Chinese: 葉方藹; pinyin: Yè fāng'ǎi; Wade–Giles: Yeh Fang-ai, 20 May 1629 – 3 June 1682) was a Han Chinese official during the Qing dynasty.

== Biography ==
Ye Fang'ai
- Traditional Chinese: 葉方藹
- Simplified Chinese: 叶方蔼
Transcriptions
Standard Mandarin
- Hanyu Pinyin: Yèfāng'ǎi

Posthumous name
- Chinese: 文敏
Transcriptions
Standard Mandarin
- Hanyu Pinyin: Wénmǐn

Ye came from a scholarly family in Kunshan, Jiangsu. His father, Ye Chonghua, was a jinshi of 1628 who served as an official in Shandong and Guangdong during the waning years of the Ming Dynasty. Ye took the imperial examination in 1659 and was awarded a jinshi degree. He also had the distinction of being the tanhua of his year, the jinshi who ranked third overall in the final stage of exams. Ye was subsequently appointed as a second-class compiler. In 1661, Ye was temporarily dismissed from office after being implicated in the “Taxation Case of Jiangnan” (江南奏銷案) along with 13,800 people from Jiangsu. Ye was dismissed on a technicality since he only owed one li of silver. He was later pardoned and returned to office. Ye continued climbing the ranks of the civil service, becoming an expositor and then a reader in the Hanlin Academy in 1676.

The following year, Ye began supervising the compilation of Xiaojing yani (孝經衍義), which was a work that expanded on the Classic of Filial Piety. In 1678, he then became a director-general in charge of the compilation of the Huangyu biao (皇輿表), a work concerning the official geography of the Qing Empire. Alongside Chen Tingjing, Ye was summoned to serve in the Imperial Study in the summer of 1678 before becoming chancellor of the Hanlin Academy and vice-president of the Board of Rites concurrently. In 1679, Ye was among the four scholars chosen to take a set of special examinations called the boxue hongci. He then became a director-general, supervising the compilation of the History of Ming. Ye was appointed junior vice-president at the Ministry of Justice in 1681 before dying the following year. He was honoured with the posthumous name Wenmin (文敏), an exceptional honour given that Ye never reached the presidency of a Board.
