= Gao Shiqi =

Han Chinese politician, scholar and art collector

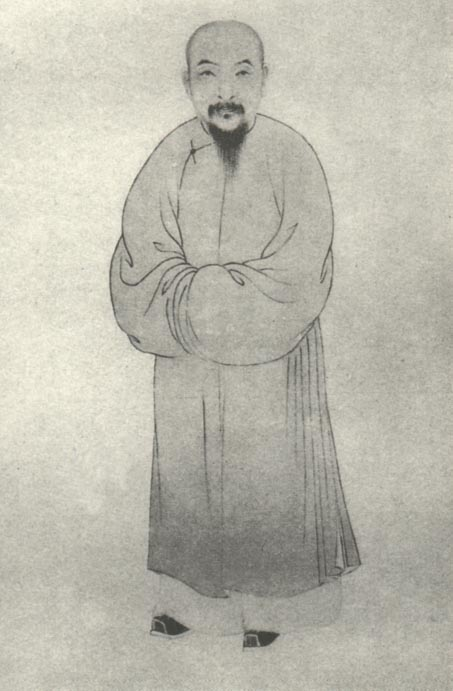
Gao Shiqi

Gao Shiqi (Chinese: 高士奇; pinyin: Gāo Shìqí; Wade–Giles: Kao Shih-ch’i, 26 October 1645 – 1703) was a Han Chinese politician, scholar, and art collector of the Qing Dynasty.

== Career ==
Gao Shiqi
- Traditional Chinese: 高士奇
- Simplified Chinese: 高士奇
Transcriptions
Standard Mandarin
- Hanyu Pinyin: Gāo shìqí

Posthumous name
- Chinese: 文恪
Transcriptions
Standard Mandarin
- Hanyu Pinyin: Wénkè

Gao was born in Guan in Zhili province in 1631 and raised in Hangzhou. Although poor, he developed a great talent for writing and calligraphy at an early age. In search of better prospects he ventured north when he was 19 and eventually moved to Beijing in 1665. He enrolled in the Imperial Academy and became a clerk in the Hanlin Academy after winning a competitive examination in 1671. In 1675, he gained a clerkship in the Supervisorate of Imperial Instruction. Although Gao did not possess a coveted jinshi degree, his literary talents were enough to propel his career forward. His impressive skills in calligraphy and writing court poems attracted the attention of the Kangxi Emperor, who summoned him to serve in the Imperial Study in 1677. Gao was given a home west of the Forbidden City so that he could be quickly summoned. Until 1688, he would frequently appear by the emperor's side day and night. He also accompanied the emperor on many imperial tours, leaving intimate accounts of these journeys in Songting xingji (松亭行紀), which concerned a journey to Jehol in 1681 and in Hucong dongxun rilu (扈從東巡日錄), which recounted a trip to Mukden and Ula (Jilin) in 1682.

In 1680, Gao was made an expositor in the Hanlin Academy before being promoted to supervisor of instruction in 1687. However, the following year, he was relieved of his duties and relegated to compiling literary works of lesser importance after being involved in a bribery case. This was a relatively light punishment, perhaps owing to Gao's status as a favourite of the emperor. In early 1689, Gao was summoned to accompany the emperor on his second tour of south China. Later the same year, Gao was again accused of taking bribes by Guo Xiu, who pointed out in his memorial that Gao had become very rich in less than twenty-five years after coming to the capital as a poor student. Gao by this time had indeed developed a 'notorious' reputation for taking bribes, with popular ballads satirizing how he received jewellery and gifts from 'ten thousand countries'. As a result, Gao was forced to retire and he left the capital for Pinghu, Zhejiang, where he indulged in various literary pursuits.

In 1694, Gao was summoned to Beijing by the emperor to work on the History of Ming. The emperor also reappointed him to serve in the Imperial Study as one of his personal secretaries. He continued to accompany the emperor on various trips around China, even joining the latter on two of his expeditions against Galdan. Gao was finally granted leave to retire in 1697 to look after his aged mother. He was appointed vice-president in the Board of Rites in 1702, but declined the appointment to spend more time on literary pursuits at home and to continue looking after his elderly mother. He died in 1703 after returning from an audience with the emperor in Beijing. He was canonized as Wenke (文恪) in 1704, a highly unusual posthumous honour given his relatively modest official rank.

== Art collecting ==
Gao was a highly accomplished art collector who amassed a huge private art collection. He is considered to be one of the most important art collectors of the early Qing period. According to art historian Amy Huang, his collecting practices played an important part in how he defined his political and social status in the Qing imperial court.

== See also ==
- Xu Qianxue
