= Li Guangdi =

Qing dynasty politician

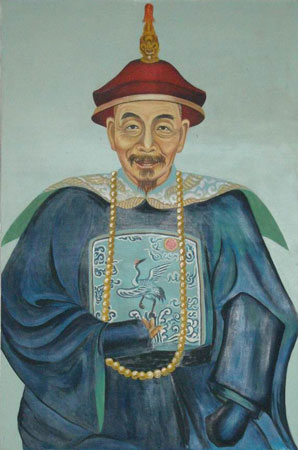

Grand Secretary of the Wenyuan Library
- In office 1705–1718

Minister of Personnel
- In office 7 June 1703 – 24 December 1705 Serving with Dunbai
- Preceded by: Chen Tingjing
- Succeeded by: Song Luo

Governor of Zhili
- In office 1698–1705
- Preceded by: Yu Chenglong the Junior
- Succeeded by: Zhao Hongxie

Personal details
- Born: 29 September 1642 Anxi County, Fujian, Ming dynasty
- Died: 26 June 1718 (aged 75) Beijing, Qing dynasty
- Education: Jinshi degree in the Imperial Examination
- Occupation: Politician

Li Guangdi (Chinese: 李光地; Pe̍h-ōe-jī: Lí Kong-tē; 1642–1718), also known by his courtesy name Jinqing (Chinese: 晉卿; Pe̍h-ōe-jī: Chìn-kheng) and sobriquet Hou'an (Chinese: 厚庵; Pe̍h-ōe-jī: Hō͘-am), was a Chinese neo-Confucianist and court official.

== Biography ==
Li was a native of Hutouzhen, Anxi County, Fujian Province. In 1670, he was promoted to the rank of jinshi and moved to Beijing, leaving his brother Li Guangpo behind to look after his family. Li's career prospects improved after Fujian was captured by the enemy. He also partially helped defeat Cantonese rebels in Guangdong, persuading his friend Chen Menglei to work as a spy in Geng's camp. Later in life, he was responsible for planning Shi Lang's conquest of Taiwan. During the course of his life, Li held various court positions, including Chancellor of the Hanlin Academy, Governor of Zhili and Grand Secretary, and positions on the Board of War, Board of Civil Service and the Board of Public Works.

== Philosophy ==
Li's philosophy was rooted in the Cheng-Zhu school. However, despite being a follower of Zhu Xi he did not entirely disregard the teachings of Zhu's rivals Lu Jiuyuan and Wang Yangming. He also highlighted similarities between the teachings of Confucius and those of Buddha and Lao Tzu. Li felt that human nature (which he believed to be inherently good) was the ultimate subject of his study, and that nature was the guiding principle on which to base human morality. He had an interest in the sciences.

Li wrote or edited a number of philosophical texts, including the Complete Works of Master Zhu (Zhuzi daquan), the Essential Ideas of Nature and Principle (Xingli jingli) and the Interpretation of the Meaning of the Four Books (Si shu Jieyi). An expert on the I Ching, he also wrote two books on the subject, the Penetrating Discourse (Zhouyi tonglun) and the Balanced Annotations (Zhouyi zhezhong); the latter took the (at the time) unusual editorial step of segregating the original text of the I Ching from its subsequent commentaries. A complete collection of Li's works (around thirty books) was published around a hundred years after his death, entitled the Complete Works of Rongcun (Rongcun quanji).
