= Xu Qianxue =

Han Chinese politician and scholar of the Qing dynasty (1631–1694)

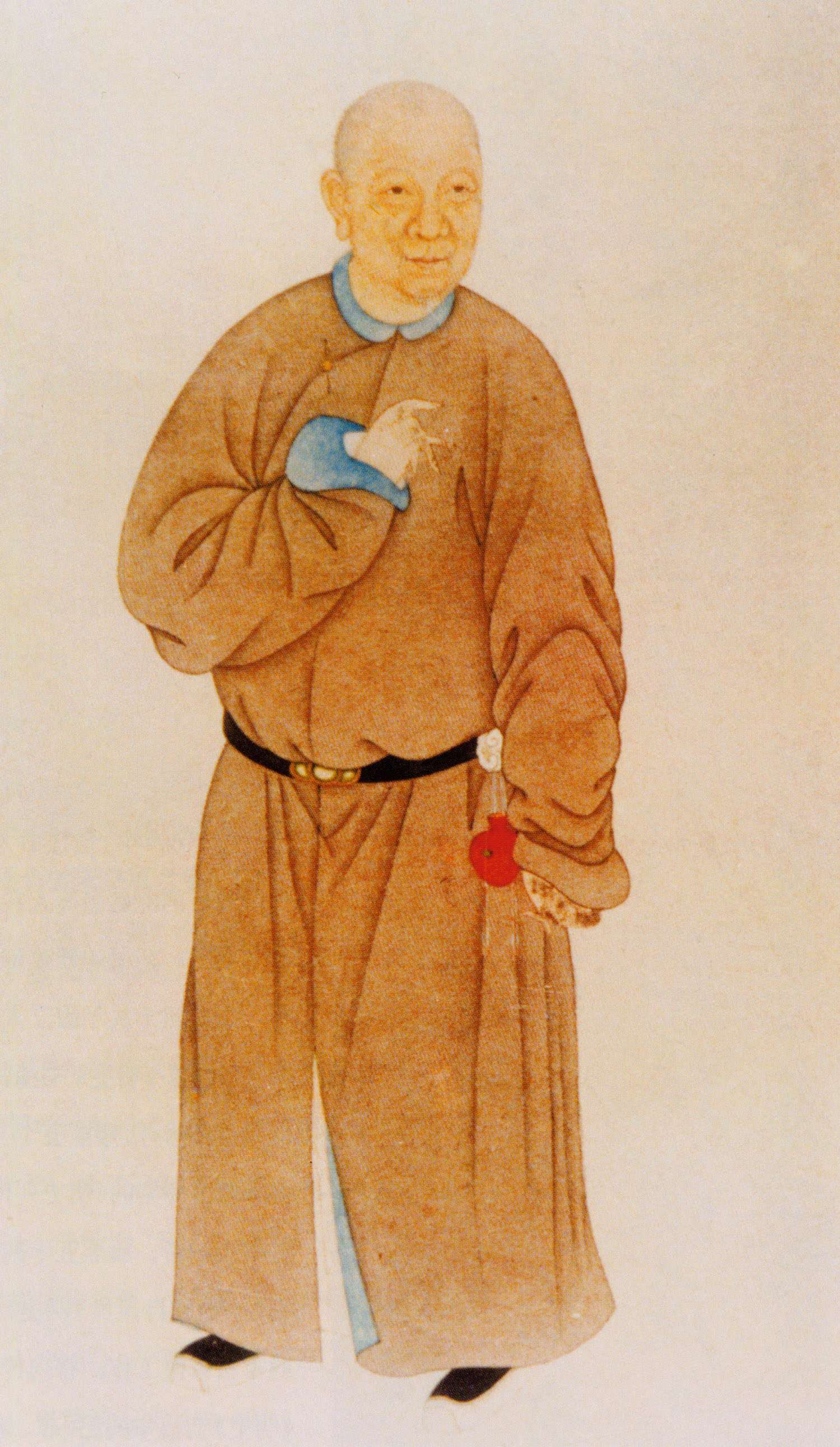

Minister of Justice
- In office March 27, 1688 – June 5, 1688 Serving with Tuna
- Preceded by: Zhang Yushu
- Succeeded by: Li Tianfu

Personal details
- Born: November 24, 1631 Kunshan, Jiangsu, China
- Died: September 8, 1694 (aged 62) Beijing, China

Xu Qianxue (Chinese: 徐乾學; pinyin: Xú Qiánxué; Wade–Giles: Hsu Ch‘ien-hsueh, 24 November 1631 – 8 September 1694) was a Han Chinese politician, scholar, and bibliophile of the Qing dynasty.

== Career ==
Xu Qianxue
- Traditional Chinese: 徐乾學
- Simplified Chinese: 徐乾学
Transcriptions
Standard Mandarin
- Hanyu Pinyin: Xú Qiánxué

Xu Qianxue was born in Kunshan in Jiangsu province in 1631. He obtained a jinshi degree in the imperial examination in 1670, ranking third overall as a Tanhua. In 1672, he was placed in charge of supervising the Shun-t'ien provincial examinations. He was tasked with compiling the History of Ming in 1682 before being promoted to the sub-chancellorship of the Grand Secretariat in 1685. He concurrently served as an instructor in the Hanlin Academy. The following year, Xu was appointed vice-president of the Board of Rites and was made president of the Censorate in 1687. At the same time, Xu served as director-general of the commission appointed to compile the Comprehensive Geography of the Empire (大明一統志). Xu then became president of the Board of Punishments in 1688 as well as chief examiner of the metropolitan examination.

Xu was heavily involved in the factional struggles between Mingju and Songgotu in the late-seventeenth century. He supported Mingju's 'northern party' against Songgotu, but formed his own 'southern party' after falling out with Mingju. Xu also had a bitter rivalry with Li Guangdi, who considered him 'treacherous and dangerous in Court politics'. Xu resigned from office after he was accused to taking bribes from Zhang Qian, who was then governor of Huguang. However, Xu remained in Beijing to supervise various literary projects. After his opponents accused one of his sons of, among other offences, obtaining his jinshi degree fraudulently, Xu resigned from these literary duties in the capital and returned home in 1690 to work on the Comprehensive Geography of the Empire with other leading scholars.

Accusations of bribery, oppression of the common people, and misdemeanours committed by his family and servants followed Xu into retirement. According to Qizhi Zhang, Xu had developed an infamous reputation for abuse of power and taking bribes. There were popular ballads satirizing Xu's wealth 'piled up to the sky'. Consequently, he was stripped of his official rank and honours in 1691. In 1694, Xu was summoned to the capital to serve in various literary posts; however, he died before he could take office again.

== Family ==
Xu had five sons, all of whom also obtained jinshi degrees. His two younger brothers, Xu Bingyi and Xu Yuanwen, were jinshi degree holders as well. In addition, Xu was a nephew of Gu Yanwu, another famed scholar-official in the Qing Dynasty.

== See also ==
- History of Ming
