= A History of Korea =

A History of Korea may refer to:

- A History of Korea (Hatada book), a 1951 book by Takashi Hatada
- A History of Korea (Henthorn book), a 1971 book by William E. Henthorn
- A History of Korea (Tennant book), a 1996 book by Roger Tennant
- A History of Korea (Hwang book), a 2010 book by Kyung Moon Hwang
- A History of Korea (Seth book), a 2011 book by Michael J. Seth

== See also ==
- History of Korea
- The History of Korea (disambiguation)
