= Korean studies =

Academic discipline on Korean civilization

Korean studies is an academic discipline that focuses on the study of Korea, which includes South Korea, North Korea, and diasporic Korean populations. Areas commonly included under this rubric include Korean history, Korean culture, Korean literature, Korean art, Korean music, Korean language and linguistics, Korean sociology and anthropology, Korean politics, Korean economics, Korean folklore, Korean ethnomusicology and increasingly study of Korean popular culture. It may be compared to other area studies disciplines, such as American studies and Chinese studies. Korean studies is sometimes included within a broader regional area of focus including "East Asian studies".

The term Korean studies first began to be used in the 1940s, but did not attain widespread currency until South Korea rose to economic prominence in the 1970s. In 1991, the South Korean government established the Korea Foundation to promote Korean studies around the world.

Korean studies was originally an area of study conceived of and defined by non-Koreans. Korean scholars of Korea tend to see themselves as linguists, sociologists, and historians, but not as "Koreanists" unless they have received at least some of their education outside Korea and are academically active (for example publishing and attending conferences)in languages other than Korean (most Korean studies publications are in English but there is also a significant amount of Korean Studies activity in other European languages), or work outside Korean academia. In the mid-2000s, Korean universities pushing for more classes taught in English began to hire foreign-trained Koreanists of Korean and non-Korean origin to teach classes. This was often geared towards foreigners in Korean graduate schools. There are now graduate school programs in Korean Studies (mostly active at the MA level) in most of the major Korean universities. BA programs in Korean Studies have now been opened at two Korean universities. The BA programs are distinctive in that they have few foreign students.

== Debates in the field ==
What exactly Korean Studies is, who is teaching it, who is learning, and what should be taught continues to be debated.

There has been a small series of works debating Korean Studies published in academic journals. A sort of historical overview by Charles Armstrong titled "Development and Directions of Korean Studies in the United States" comes strongly from Armstrong's perspective teaching history at Columbia University, as his work: "Focusing on the discipline of history, ... traces the emergence of Korean Studies in the 1950s, the evolution of the field and the changing backgrounds of American scholars working on Korea in the 1960s to 1980s, and the rapid growth of Korean Studies since the early 1990s." Another historian, Andre Schmid published an early contribution to the debate in 2008, challenging the ways that English academia was pushing or shaping the directions of Korean Studies. Schmid explained, "In the unequal global cultural arena where English still dominates, the direction of Korean Studies in the United States disproportionately shapes international representations of Korean culture." University of Berkeley Sociologist John Lie contributed two pieces to the debate, the more recent of which challenged the Korean Studies, claiming "senior Koreanists seem rather content with their progress, telling their followers bizarre tales from the field and seeking to reproduce the archaic and mistaken Harvard East Asia paradigm." Lie discusses the weaknesses he sees in this paradigm for the remainder of the essay. In 2018 CedarBough Saeji, a scholar who has taught extensively both in Korea and in North America, published an article in Acta Koreana on the difference in teaching Korean Studies in Korea and outside Korea.

In 2026 Korean Studies is wrestling with denationalization of Korean Studies. Some scholars who have been talking about this topic include David Oh, Dal Yong Jin, Benjamin Han, and Michael Hurt. Major conferences like the World Congress of Korean Studies (Sept 2026, Kyoto) included keynotes by Vladmir Tikhonov, Joanna Elfving-Hwang, and CedarBough Saeji on the topic of future directions of Korean Studies. The three scholars represent Korean Studies in Europe, Oceania, North America, and Korea. As Korean Studies grows to be a larger field, it may further subdivide. There are already highly active organizations such as the Korean Literature Association, which regularly bring together Korean Studies scholars only within that sub-field.

One interesting way to keep track of the field is to follow the Korean Studies Event Database , which was founded at Copenhagen University under the initiative of Professor Barbara Wall.

== Institutions ==
=== Research institutes in The Republic of Korea ===
- Busan University of Foreign Studies: Global Korean Studies Research Center (글로벌 한국학 연구소), est. 2023.
- Institute of Global Korean Studies (글로벌 한국학연구원), est. 2021.
- Korea University: Research Institute of Korean Studies (고려대학교 한국문화연구), est. 1957
- Pusan National University: Korean Ethnic Culture Research Center (한국민족문화연구소), est. 1994
- SNU Kyujanggak Institute: International Center for Korean Studies , (서울대학교 규장각 한국학연구:국제한국학센터, ICKS) est. 2007.
- The Academy of Korean Studies (한국학중앙연구원, AKS) est.1978
- The Korea Research Foundation (한국학술진흥재단, KRF) est.1981
- The Korea Foundation (한국국제교류재단) est.1991.
- The Korean Studies Institute (한국국학진흥원, ACKS) est.1995.

=== Korean studies programs in The Republic of Korea ===
- Academy of Korean Studies - this is only a graduate school with no undergraduate program
- Dong-A University - Graduate School of International Studies
- Ewha Womans University - B.A. degree program (Scranton College, Division of International Studies, Department of Korean Studies) and M.A. degree program (Graduate School of International Studies, Department of Korean Studies)
- Hankuk University of Foreign Studies — Undergraduate program and Graduate program
- Hanyang University - Graduate School of International Studies
- Korea University - Graduate School of International Studies
- Pusan National University - Graduate School of International Studies
- Silla University — Study in korea
- Sangmyung University - The Graduate School, Division of Humanities and Social sciences, Department of Korean Studies
- Seoul National University - Graduate School of International Studies
- Sogang University - Undergraduate and Graduate program of the School of Integrated Knowledge(Global Korean Studies) and Graduate program(Graduate School of International Studies)
- Yonsei University - Graduate School of International Studies

=== Institutions abroad ===
The following are the major centers that have opened Korean Studies outside Korea.

Center for Korean Studies, School of Language, Literature & Culture Studies, Jawaharlal Nehru University, New Delhi, India

=== Asia ===
==== China ====
- Beijing Foreign Studies University — School of Asian and African Studies

==== Japan ====
- National Museum of Ethnology (Japan)
- Tenri University — Department of Foreign Languages
- University of Tokyo — Department of Korean Studies

==== Philippines ====
- Ateneo Korean Studies Program — Ateneo de Manila University

==== Vietnam ====
- Vietnam National University, Ho Chi Minh City — Faculty of Korean Studies, University of Social Sciences and Humanities

==== Taiwan ====
- National Chengchi University — Department of Korean Literature
- National Taiwan Normal University — Center for Korean Studies
- National University of Kaohsiung — Center for Korean Studies
- Chinese Cultural University — Center for Korean Studies

Israel

- Hebrew University of Jerusalem - Department of Asian Studies, Korean Studies Section. The section offers undergraduate (B.A.) and graduate (M.A.) studies, including research and non-research tracks. The curriculum combines intensive Korean language instruction with courses on Korean history, politics, economy, society, and culture, covering both South and North Korea. The program also offers opportunities for academic exchanges with universities in South Korea.
- Tel Aviv University - Department of East Asian Studies, offering courses in Korean history, culture, society, and language.
- University of Haifa - Department of Asian Studies, offering Korean Studies courses within its undergraduate and graduate programs.
- Bar-Ilan University - Department of Asian Studies, offering Korean Studies and Korean language courses as part of its undergraduate program.

=== America ===
==== United States ====
The United States is one of the countries with the highest interest in Korean studies, with Korean language and Korean studies courses open at all Ivy League universities, including Harvard University, Yale University, Columbia University and the University of Pennsylvania.

- Cornell University – School of East Asian Studies
- George Washington University — GW Institute for Korean Studies (GWIKS)
- University of California, Berkeley — Center for Korean Studies
- University of California, Los Angeles — Center for Korean Studies
- University of Chicago — Center for East Asian Studies
- Columbia University — Center for Korean Research
- Harvard University — Korea Institute
- University of Hawaii — Center for Korean Studies
- Indiana University – East Asian Studies CenterInstitute for Korean Studies
- Indiana University Bloomington - Center for Korean Studies
- University of Michigan — Nam Center for Korean Studies
- Ohio State University
- University of Pennsylvania — James Joo-Jin Kim Program in Korean Studies
- Tufts University, The Fletcher School of Law and Diplomacy — Chair of Korean Studies
- University of Washington - Korea Studies Program, East Asia Studies, Henry M. Jackson School of International Studies
- Yale University

==== Canada ====
- University of Toronto — Centre for the Study of Korea
- Munk School — Centre for the Study Korea
- University of Alberta — East Asian Studies
- Camosun College — University Transfer Subjects Korean Language
- University of Manitoba — Department of East Asia

=== Europe ===
==== Germany ====
- Freie Universität Berlin — Institute of Korean Studies
- Universität Hamburg — Institute of Korean Studies
- Eberhard Karls Universität Tübingen — Department of Korean Studies
- Ruhr University Bochum — Korean Studies (Language & Studies)
- University of Duisburg-Essen — Modern East Asia Studies

==== Russia ====
- Institute of Oriental Studies of the Russian Academy of Sciences – Department of Korean and Mongolian Studies
- Far Eastern Federal University — Oriental Institute – School of Regional and International Studies
- Novosibirsk State Technical University — Faculty of Humanities – International Affairs and Regional Studies

==== United Kingdom ====
- University of Leeds – Korea Research Hub, UK, Leeds
- University of London School of Oriental and African Studies — Centre of Korean Studies
- University of Sheffield — School of East Asian Studies
- University of Central Lancashire — International Institute of Korean Studies

==== France ====
- Le Centre de Recherches sur la Corée (CRC ou « Centre Corée ») de l'EHESS
- Jean Moulin University Lyon 3 — Department of Korean Studies

==== Netherlands ====
- Universiteit Leiden — Korean Studies

==== Belgium ====
- Katholieke Universiteit Leuven (University of Leuven, KU Leuven) – Center for Korean Studies
- Vrije Universiteit Brussel, Institute for European Studies — KF-VUB Korea Chair

==== Poland ====
- University of Warsaw — Department of Korean Studies
- Adam Mickiewicz University in Poznań — Department of Korean Studies

==== Spain ====
- Universidad de Salamanca — Department of Korean Literature
- Universitat Autonoma de Barcelona — Department of East Asia Korean

Romania

- University of Bucharest — Faculty of Foreign Languages and Literatures — Section of Korean Language and Literature (est. 2005; for BA Korean is offered as a Language B + Master's in East Asian Studies)
- Babeș-Bolyai University — Faculty of Letters — Department of Asian Languages and Literatures — Korean Language and Literature (est. 2008); for BA Korean is offered as a major Language A and also available as a minor Language B + Master's in East Asian Studies)
- Romanian-American University (RAU) — Department of Asian Studies — Romanian-Korean Studies Center (est. 2011); offers non-degree Korean language courses (beginner / intermediate / advanced) open to both RAU students and external learners.
- Alexandru Ioan Cuza University (UAIC) — Faculty of Letters — ROK Center for Korean Studies —2019 (funded by the Academy of Korean Studies, Seed Program); offers free short courses on Korean history, society, culture, and civilization for Faculty of Letters students.

==== Italy ====
- Sapienza University of Rome – Department of Italian Institute of Oriental Studies (ISO). Sapienza offers comprehensive degree curricula in Korean Studies within its B.A. and M.A. programs in Oriental Languages and Civilizations, covering Korean language, linguistics, philology, classical and modern literature, history, and art history. The institution actively participates in the CIVIS-KF Korean Studies E-School Consortium (in partnership with European universities and the Korea Foundation), hosts the AKS (Academy of Korean Studies) Seed Program project, and offers an integrated double degree Master's program in collaboration with Hanyang University in Seoul.
- University for Foreigners of Siena (Università per Stranieri di Siena) – Yun Dongju Centre for Korean Research and Studies (CeSK). The University for Foreigners of Siena offers Korean language and literature courses within its undergraduate and graduate degree programmes, covering Korean language, translation, linguistics, literature, culture and history. Established in 2023, the Yun Dongju Centre for Korean Research and Studies (CeSK) coordinates and promotes Korean Studies through academic research, international conferences, translation workshops, publications and student training opportunities. The Centre has participated in the Seed Program for Korean Studies, funded by the Academy of Korean Studies (AKS) of the Republic of Korea, supporting collaborative research at the intersection of the humanities, technology and digitalization. In 2026 the University was selected for the five-year Seed Program for Korean Studies (Advanced Track), entitled From Seed to Hub, aimed at developing digital archives of modern and contemporary Korean literature, research infrastructure, scholarly resources and European academic networks. The Centre also publishes the scientific series Quaderni CeSK – Orizzonti coreani “hanul”, dedicated to Korean language, literature, history and society.
- University of Turin (UniTo) – Department of Foreign Languages, Literatures and Modern Cultures. UniTo offers comprehensive curricula in Korean Studies within its B.A., M.A., and Ph.D. degree programs, combining robust linguistic training with an interdisciplinary approach covering Korean language, literature, culture, and cinema. Supported by the Korea Foundation Professorship Program, the institution actively fosters advanced research in contemporary Korea and maintains academic exchange with leading South Korean institutions, including Seoul National University, Ewha Womans University, and Korea University. Additionally, UniTo hosts a King Sejong Institute branch, which offers Korean language courses alongside a wide range of cultural activities and events.

=== Oceania ===
==== Australia ====
- Curtin University, Korea Research Centre of Western Australia
- The University of Western Australia
- Monash University - Monash University Korean Studies Research Hub,
- The Australian National University Korea Institute

==== New Zealand ====
- Auckland University of Technology — Korean Language and Culture

== Academic journals ==
- The Journal of Korean Studies (JKS) has just moved to George Washington University after stints at University of Washington and Columbia.
- Korean Studies (KS) University of Hawaii.
- Korea Journal Formerly published by the Korean National Commission for UNESCO, Seoul, South Korea, this journal is now published by the Academy of Korean Studies.
- Acta Koreana Keimyung University, Daegu.
- Chosen Gakuho: Journal of the Academic Association of Koreanology in Japan, Tenri University.
- Korean Culture and Society, Association for the Study of Korean Culture and Society.
- Routledge Research on Korea Series.
- Korean and Korean American Studies Bulletin (KKASB). East Rock Institute

== Associations for Korean Studies overseas ==
- Academic Association of Koreanology in Japan
- The Association for Korean Studies in Europe (AKSE)
- Association for the Study of Korean Culture and Society (Japan)
- British Association for Korean Studies (BAKS)
- Committee on Korean Studies of the Association for Asian Studies (CKS)
- Korean Studies Association of Australasia (KSAA)

== Koreanists ==
The term Koreanist generally indicates an academic scholar of Korean language, history, culture, society, music, art, literature, film, or any other subject who primarily publishes in a Western language. All such Koreanists are fluent in Korean and various other relevant research languages.

Koreanists who have published at least one Western-language academic book or more than half a dozen academic articles include:

- Archeology: Gina Barnes, Mark E. Byington, Hyung Il Pai.
- Cinema: Andrew David Jackson, Kyung Hyun Kim, Michelle Cho, Jinhee Choi.
- Early Koreanists: James Scarth Gale, William E. Skillend, Richard Rutt.
- Fine arts: Burglind Jungmann, Maya K. H. Stiller.
- Folklore and anthropology: Hesung Chun Koh, Nancy Abelmann, Chungmoo Choi, Martina Deuchler, Stephen Epstein, Joanna Elfving-Hwang, Roger Janelli, Laurel Kendall, John Lie, Shimpei Cole Ota, Hyung Il Pai, Mutsuhiko Shima, CedarBough Saeji, Bonnie Tilland, Olga Fedorenko, Jeon Kyungwook, Kyong Yoon, John Sungpae Cho.
- History: Remco E. Breuker, Mark E. Byington, Mark E. Caprio, Yong-ho Ch'oe, Bruce Cumings, John B. Duncan, Carter J. Eckert, Kyung Moon Hwang, Andrew David Jackson, Hugh H. W. Kang, Anders Karlsson, Nan Kim, Kirk W. Larsen, Namhee Lee, James B. Lewis, Christopher Lovins, Yumi Moon, James B. Palais, N. M. Pankaj, Eugene Y. Park, Mark A. Peterson, Kenneth R. Robinson, Michael Robinson, Edward J. Shultz, Felix Siegmund, Vladimir Tikhonov also known as Pak Noja, Edward W. Wagner, Todd Henry, Jisoo Kim, Jisoo Hyun, Michael Kim, Young-ick Lew.
- International relations: Victor D. Cha, Stephan Haggard, David C. Kang, Sung-Yoon Lee.
- International Law: Kwang Lim Koh
- Linguistics: Ross King
- Literature: Yang Hi Choe-Wall, Kyeong-Hee Choi, Marion Eggert, Gregory N. Evon, Bruce Fulton, JaHyun Kim Haboush, Christopher Hanscom, Peter H. Lee, David R. McCann, Michael J. Pettid, Marshall Pihl, Youngjoo Ryu, Serk-Bae Suh, Brother Anthony of Taize, Barbara Wall, Jenny Wang Medina, Immanuel Kim
- North Korea: Charles K. Armstrong, Suzy Kim, Andrei Lankov, Nina Špitálníková, Suk-young Kim, Cheehyung Harrison Kim, Immanuel Kim.
- Performing arts: Keith Howard, Hwang Byungki, Lee Byongwon, Lee Duhyon, Lee Hye-ku, Roald Maliangkay, Stephanie Choi, Suk-young Kim, Jocelyn Clark, Hilary V Finchum-Sung, Donna Kwon, Hyun Kyong Hannah Chang, CedarBough Saeji, Areum Jeong.
- Philosophy and religion: Juhn Y. Ahn, Don Baker, Robert Buswell Jr., Donald N. Clark, James H. Grayson, Michael Kalton, Daeyeol Kim, Hwansoo Ilmee Kim, Sujung Kim, N. M. Pankaj, Jin Y. Park, Franklin D. Rausch, Isabelle Sancho, Sem Vermeersch, Boudewijn Walraven, Antonetta L. Bruno.
- Pop Culture / Hallyu Studies / Communications: Stephen Epstein, Doobo Shim, Suk-young Kim, Olga Fedorenko, Dal Yong Jin, Michelle Cho, CedarBough Saeji, Areum Jeong.
- Sociology: Gi-Wook Shin, Andrew Eungi Kim, Hyuk-rae Kim, Michael Hurt

== See also ==
- Korean Wave also called Hallyu
- Economy of South Korea
- List of academic disciplines
- North Korean studies
