= James Palais =

American Koreanist (1934–2006)

James Bernard Palais (Korean: 제임스 팔레; 1934–2006) was an American historian, Koreanist, and writer. He served as Professor of Korean History at the University of Washington; and he was a key figure in establishing Korean studies in the United States.

== Early years ==
Born in Brookline, Massachusetts, Palais graduated from Harvard University in 1955 with a bachelor's degree in American history. He learned Korean in the army at the Monterey Language Institute; and this sparked an interest in East Asia.

Following his discharge from the army, he earned an MA in Japanese History from Yale in 1960.

Palais studied at the Kyujanggak from 1963 to 1965. His Ph.D. was conferred at Harvard in 1968 with a dissertation on the reform policies of Heungseon Daewongun in the late 1800s. His dissertation was published under the title Politics and Policies in Traditional Korea by Harvard University Press in 1975. At Harvard he had worked with Edward W. Wagner, one of the founders of Korean studies in North America.

== Career ==
Palais taught at Norfolk State University and the University of Maine before being recruited to help build up what was then known as the Far Eastern and Russian Institute at the University of Washington. He became chairman of the Korean Studies Program there, and in 2002 he was made chairman of the East Asian Studies Institute at Sungkyunkwan University in Seoul, South Korea as well.

Palais' arrival in 1968 made the University of Washington program the largest Korean Studies Program on the North American mainland because there were three full-time scholars devoted exclusively to the study of Korea.

From 1974-77, Palais edited Occasional Papers on Korean Studies, as known as the Journal of Korean Studies, which was edited out of the University of Washington until 1988. Palais' political interests resulted in the Asia Watch report Human Rights in Korea (Washington, 1986), but perhaps his greatest work was the 1230-page Confucian Statecraft and Korean Institutions: Yu Hyŏngwŏn and the late Chosŏn Dynasty, a comprehensive overview of Choson Dynasty (1392-1910) Korean institutions as discussed by the eminent 17th century Korean statesman, Yu Hyŏngwŏn. This book was awarded the John Whitney Hall book prize as the best book on Japan or Korea in 1998.

Palais was recognized with the Yongjae Paek Nakchun Award from Korea's Yonsei University in 1995, and by The Association for Asian studies with a lifetime achievement award in Asian Studies in 2001. Palais was Dean for International Studies at Sungkyunkwan University in Korea for three years.

Palais continued his activity at the University of Washington with editing, writing, and part-time teaching in the Korea Studies Program until hospitalized with his final illness in the spring of 2005.

== Selected works ==
In a statistical overview derived from writings by and about James Palais, OCLC/WorldCat encompasses roughly 10+ works in 50+ publications in 3 languages and 1,300+ library holdings.

- Politics and Policy in Traditional Korea (1975)
- Korea on the Eve of the Kangwa Treaty, 1873-1876 (1989)
- Confucian statecraft and Korean Institutions: Yu Hyŏngwŏn and the late Chosŏn Dynasty (1995)
- Palais, James B.. 1995. “A Search for Korean Uniqueness”. Harvard Journal of Asiatic Studies 55 (2). Harvard-Yenching Institute: 409–25. doi:10.2307/2719348. https://www.jstor.org/stable/2719348.
- Views on Korean Social History (1998)

== Honors ==
- Yonsei University, Yongjae Paek Nakchun Award, 1995.
- Association for Asian Studies (AAS), John Whitney Hall Book Prize, 1998.
- AAS Lifetime Achievement Award, 2001.

The James B. Palais Professorship of Korean History at the University of Washington has been established in his honor.

=== AAS James B. Palais Book Prize ===
The Association for Asian Studies (AAS) Northeast Asia Council (NEAC) presents the James B. Palais Book Prize, which has been awarded annually since 2010 for an outstanding English language book published on Korea.
