= Yeoseong yeongung soseol =

Korean literary genre

Yeoseong yeongung soseol (여성영웅 소설; 女性英雄 小說; Female Hero Fiction) is a Korean literary genre that consists of works structured around chronicling the lives of female heroines. In general, these works depict a female protagonist disguising herself as a man and then proceeding to fight in battles or demonstrate other forms of heroic behavior.

== Main contents ==
=== Concept of female hero fiction ===
Female hero fiction is a genre of literary fiction that features a heroic female character as its main protagonist and follows her life story. Typically, works of female hero fiction follow the archetypal structure of “a hero’s life” in which a character, often descended from a noble family and born under unusual circumstances, is orphaned or suffers after running away from home, and finally emerges victorious only after undergoing numerous struggles. The fact that a woman plays the role of the hero can be understood as a modification in form of the traditional hero fiction, emerging as a later variation in a natural process of change and adaptation of the traditional hero fiction. In the early years, the hero fiction was thought of as a “low-ranking” or “low-class” literary genre, but as research into individual works has proliferated, the female hero fiction has come to be understood as a unique and independent category of fiction.

=== Female hero fiction as category ===
Representative works of female hero fiction are Seol Sojeo jeon (薛小姐傳 The Tale of Seol Sojeo), Bak ssi buin jeon (朴氏夫人傳 The Tale of Madame Park), Okju hoyeon (玉珠好緣 The Good Union of the Jade and the Pearl), Hong Gyewol jeon (洪桂月傳 The Tale of Hong Gyewol), Kim Huigyeong jeon (金喜慶傳 The Tale of Kim Huigyeong), Bang Hanrim jeon (方翰林傳 The Tale of Bang Hanrim), and Jeong Sujeong jeon (鄭秀貞傳 The Tale of Jeong Sujeong). In general, these works are characterized by a female protagonist disguising herself as a man and descriptions of war, but the female protagonist in Bak ssi buin jeon does not disguise herself as a man, and Seol Sojeo jeon does not feature any war stories. Thus, though all these works fall under the category of “female hero fiction,” there are small differences between them.

When considering these points, female hero fiction can be largely divided into two categories. The first subcategory of female hero fiction includes all the elements of disguising as a man and war stories. That is, this subcategory includes works that depict the course of the female protagonist's heroic life, during which the female protagonist disguises herself as a man and fights in the battlefield during wartime to demonstrate her heroic capabilities. Other examples include Hong Gyewol jeon, where the female protagonist disguises herself a man and then takes the civil service examination, appearing afterwards in the battlefield to save the land in a time of crisis and then is successful in the public sphere, as well as Bang Hanrim jeon, in which the female protagonist disguises herself as a man and lives as a man for the rest of her life, taking the civil service examination, battling in war, and demonstrating her heroic abilities.

The second subcategory of female hero fiction comprises stories in which a female protagonist appears and demonstrates her abilities through activities in the public domain. Though the structure of these stories does not entirely adhere to the template of chronicling a hero's life, this subcategory includes stories where the female protagonist's heroic behavior is depicted. Examples include Seol Sojeo jeon, where the female protagonist does not participate directly in battle, but nevertheless disguises herself as a man and takes the civil service examination to become a respected civil minister (munsin), as well as Bak ssi buin jeon, where the female protagonist does not disguise herself as a man and does not leave the domestic sphere, but nevertheless demonstrates her heroic capacities and saves the land from a crisis.

=== Creation and spread of female hero fiction ===
There are numerous theories regarding the creation and spread of the female hero fiction as a literary genre. In 1724, Gwon Seob (權燮, 1671-1759), a Confucian scholar, translated Seol Sojeo jeon (薛小姐傳 The Tale of Seol Sojeo) into classical Chinese, with the title of the translation as Beon seolgyeong jeon (번설경전 The Translated Tale of Seolgyeong). The original work, Seol Sojeo jeon, and other similar works of female hero fiction, were thus introduced sometime before the mid-eighteenth century. We can thereby estimate the time period in which the female hero fiction as a literary genre first appeared, but defining the temporal order of individual works of female hero fiction remains difficult. Previous research, based on analysis of narrative content, proposed that works where female consciousness appears more strongly or have a more critical mindset towards patriarchy were produced in later time periods. However, this view has recently garnered criticism for its lack of empirical evidence. Moreover, in tandem with readers’ demands, there has been an increase in perspectives that advocate for further subdividing works of female hero fiction into diverse affiliations.

== Features and significance ==
=== Significance of female consciousness in female hero fiction ===
The female hero fiction is a popular narrative form worthy of attention precisely for its mass appeal. Yet what is most notable about these works is their representation of female consciousness, particularly in light of the fact that society in the later Joseon Dynasty strictly observed the principle that men and women (and the domains they occupy) should be kept separate and that these novels portraying active female protagonists were nevertheless created and circulated. In the majority of female hero fiction, the female protagonists disguise themselves as a man in order to transgress the strict division (both spatial and societal) between men and women.

While the trope of disguising themselves as a man has consistently appeared in the genre, it is generally only a temporary measure inserted to enhance the novel's entertainment value. However, this trope can also be seen as structured through the larger narrative form of telling a hero's life story. The length of the period of time during which the female protagonist continuously disguises herself as a man differs per each work of female hero fiction. In this sense, the following categories can be created: 1) works in which the female protagonist temporarily disguises herself as a man and then returns to the domestic space of the family and life as a woman (e. g. Okju hoyeon); 2) works in which the female protagonist, even after her true identity as a woman is discovered, continues to dress as a man and ventures out into the public sphere of men (e.g. Hong Gyewol jeon); 3) works in which the female protagonist lives her entire life as a man with the simultaneous existence of another female protagonist that retains her female identity (e. g. Bang Hanrim jeon).

Why does the trope of disguising oneself as a man appear in female hero fiction? At the most basic level, the female protagonists in this genre disguise themselves as men in accordance with the concept of yeohwa winam (女化爲男)—that is, a woman changes and becomes socially recognized as a man. This reflects the social reality of the later Joseon Dynasty in which the entry of women into public affairs was fundamentally prohibited, while simultaneously reflecting women's desire for equality. In works of female hero fiction, the female protagonist obtains the opportunity to experience the world outside the domestic space of the home by disguising herself as a man. The female protagonist that disguises herself as a man is able to freely travel, and while meeting various helpers and teachers, learns military strategies, martial arts, poetry and calligraphy, and other forms of scholarship. Moreover, they take the civil service examination and are appointed to public office, make remarkable contributions during war and receive honors for their distinguished services, even able to acquire significant power and authority. However, regardless of how talented or exceptional the individual is, the actions of the female protagonists are still prohibited for women and it is only by disguising themselves as men that they can perform them. To summarize, the act of disguising oneself as a man allows the female protagonist to reveal herself and is a decision that indirectly allows her to fulfill her yearnings for societal achievements—that is, an act that must be undertaken in order to break free from stereotypes regarding gender roles to receive acknowledgment for her skill and accomplishments in the public sphere. This kind of decision can also be interpreted as interrogating the stereotypes regarding fixed gender roles assigned to both men and women at the time. While women envy the freedom and independence granted only to men, this decision also reflects women's desire to achieve equal status and rights with men.

=== Limits of female consciousness in female hero fiction ===
However, critics have also pointed out the limits of female consciousness and subjectivity as represented in works of female hero fiction. Criticism has centered around the ways in which the female hero's accomplishments and personality are portrayed, in that the actions of the female protagonist after entering society essentially amounts to avenging their wronged parents, restoring a fallen family, or solidifying the state's power and authority. At first glance, it appears as if the female protagonist daringly breaks with collective values in order to pursue her own individual desires and self-realization, but ultimately, her actions strengthen the collective order and system. One example can be found in Bang Hanrim jeon where the female protagonist continuously lives as a man (that is, she does not revert to life as a woman even after her identity is discovered) and in the absence of a patriarch, she takes up that role to become analogous with a man and makes sacrifices in order to ensure her family's continuation and prosperity. In this sense, Bang Hanrim jeon has also been interpreted as a work that enforces patriarchy and patriarchal values.

Moreover, others have criticized the ways in which the female protagonists’ actions are unrealistic and take place in an overly idealized dimension—that their deviations from social norms and success would never be permitted in society at the time. That the representation of female heroes are clearly differentiated from “real” women may provide female readers with a sense of pleasure, but their influence is limited to the sheer provision of entertainment and these female heroes’ unparalleled talents cannot be unconditionally defended or exalted. Of course, these works of female hero fiction are certainly significant in that they catalyzed a recognition of an individual woman's talents, their heroic spirit, and the equivalence of skill between men and women. Nevertheless, critics have argued that it is necessary to bear in mind this recognition does not extend to “general” women to advance a notion of universal equality. For instance, there are scenes in Hong Gyewol jeon and Jeong Sujeong jeon in which the female protagonists kill their husbands’ concubines. This kind of representation merely portrays antagonism between women in which they are positioned as victims within the institution of the family, and delineates the limits of female hero fiction in that the female protagonists are unable to escape or look beyond the patriarchal structure.

=== Interrogating the gender binary ===
In earlier works of female hero fiction where the trope of dressing as a man appears, the female characters, by simply changing their clothes from wearing a woman's to a man's and changing their appearances, are accorded new opportunities and possibilities. The fact that by dressing as a man, they can enter areas of society that were permitted only to men, fundamentally questions how men and women are different and alike, and asks what precisely makes a woman a “woman.” In particular, recent research that analyzes female hero fiction through scholar Judith Butler's theories on gender has proliferated. Specifically, female hero fiction has been interpreted as a literary genre in which the gender binary and prejudicial suppression relating to binary views of gender are interrogated, and where the fluidity of gender divisions and gender's variability are represented. With the incorporation of such theories in recent critical perspectives, female hero fiction can be interpreted in new ways. For instance, Bang Hanrim jeon, which has generally been interpreted as a work that supports patriarchal norms and beliefs (in that the female protagonist continuously lives as a man), has recently been re-interpreted as a work that actually signals the failure of the gender binary of “man” and “woman” and the commensurate norms that accompany this binary.
