= Encyclopedia of Korean Culture =

South Korean encyclopedia

- Website logo
- Author: Academy of Korean Studies
- Language: Korean
- Subject: Korean studies
- Genre: Reference encyclopedia
- Publisher: DongBang Media Co.
- Publication place: South Korea
- Website: encykorea.aks.ac.kr (in Korean)

Korean name
- Hangul: 한국민족문화대백과사전
- Hanja: 韓國民族文化大百科事典
- RR: Hanguk minjok munhwa daebaekgwasajeon
- MR: Han'guk minjok munhwa taebaekkwasajŏn

The Encyclopedia of Korean Culture (Korean: 한국민족문화대백과사전) is a Korean-language encyclopedia written by the Academy of Korean Studies and published by DongBang Media Co. It was originally published as physical books from 1991 to 2001. There is now an online version of the encyclopedia that continues to be updated.

It has been described as one of the most frequently used and extensive encyclopedias for Korean studies.

== Overview ==
On September 25, 1979, a presidential order (No. 9628; ｢한국민족문화대백과사전 편찬사업 추진위원회 규정｣) was issued to begin work on compiling a national encyclopedia. Work began on compiling the encyclopedia on March 18, 1980. It began publishing books in 1991. The encyclopedia's first version was completed, with 28 volumes, in 1995. It continued to be revised beginning in 1996. In 2001, the digital edition EncyKorea was published on CD-ROM and DVD. It launched an online version in 2007. A second push to update the encyclopedia concluded in 2017.

The articles in the encyclopedia are aimed at readers who want to learn about Korean culture and history, and were written by over 3,800 scholars and expert contributors who are mainly associated with the Academy of Korean Studies.

It has been described as one of the most frequently used encyclopedias for Korean studies, as well as one of the most extensive. The terminology used in the encyclopedia has reportedly had a visible impact on terminology used in academic literature.

== See also ==
- Category:South Korean online encyclopedias
- Category:Korean-language encyclopedias
- Lists of encyclopedias
- List of encyclopedias by language
- List of online encyclopedias
