= Korea Journal =

South Korean academic journal

- Discipline: Korean studies
- Language: English
- Edited by: Myounhoi Do

Publication details
- History: 1961–present
- Publisher: Academy of Korean Studies
- Frequency: Quarterly

Standard abbreviations
- ISO 4: Korea J.

Indexing
- CODEN: KOJODS
- ISSN: 0023-3900 (print); 2733-9343 (web)
- LCCN: 65035396
- OCLC no.: 439602202

Links
- Journal homepage

The Korea Journal is a quarterly peer-reviewed academic journal covering Korean studies. It was established in 1961 and is published by the Academy of Korean Studies. The editor-in-chief is Myoun-hoi Do (Daejeon University). The journal is abstracted and indexed in the Arts and Humanities Citation Index.

== See also ==
- The Journal of Korean Studies
- Korean Studies
