= The History of Korea =

The History of Korea may refer to:

- The History of Korea, 1970 book by Woo-keun Han
- The History of Korea, 1905 book by Homer Hulbert

== See also ==
- A History of Korea (disambiguation)
- History of Korea
