= A History of Korea (Hwang book) =

2010 non-fiction book by Kyung Moon Hwang

A History of Korea: An Episodic Narrative
- Author: Kyung Moon Hwang
- Publisher: Palgrave Macmillan
- Publication date: 2010
- Pages: 309
- ISBN: 978-0-230-20545-1

A History of Korea: An Episodic Narrative is a non-fiction book by Kyung Moon Hwang. It was published in 2010 by Palgrave Macmillan.

== Summary ==
With twenty eight chapters, A History of Korea describes the history of Korea from the Battle of Salsu to the presidency of Lee Myung-bak. It was published as part of the Palgraves Essential History series.

== Reception ==
Reviews for A History of Korea praised the book for its potential in an undergraduate course on Korean history, pointing to what they felt was a clear narrative and chapter layout. Franklin Rausch, in The Journal of Korean Studies, highlighted the shorter-than-average chapter length, as well as how self-contained they were, and particularly positive elements considering the target audience. Rausch in general praised the, noting that his critiques– that there was an error in the death tolls Hwang provided for the Sinyu Persecution and the lack of information given about the importance of religion in the works of works of Kim Chi-ha and Ko Un – as being "of little consequence" to the overall value of the book. A review in Acta Koreana agreed that certain elements of Korean history, such as the entirely of pre-modern Korea, were given less space, but felt that this was fair given the importance of more modern events. The reviewer also noted the amount of time Hwang spent discussing Na Hye-sŏk, but felt this was appropriate as it might help "redress the balance in the narrative of Korean history that until recently has been dominated by accounts of its male actors". Additionally, the reviewer praised Hwang's "lively style of writing".

Reviews in both The Journal of Korean Studies and Acta Korena bemoaned the lack of images of the Koguryŏ tomb murals.
