= John Lie =

John Lie may refer to:

- John Lie (professor), professor of sociology at the University of California, Berkeley
- John Lie (Indonesian Navy officer) (1911–1988), navy commander and National Hero of Indonesia
