= Hwaseong seongyeok uigwe =

1801 record of the Hwaseong Fortress

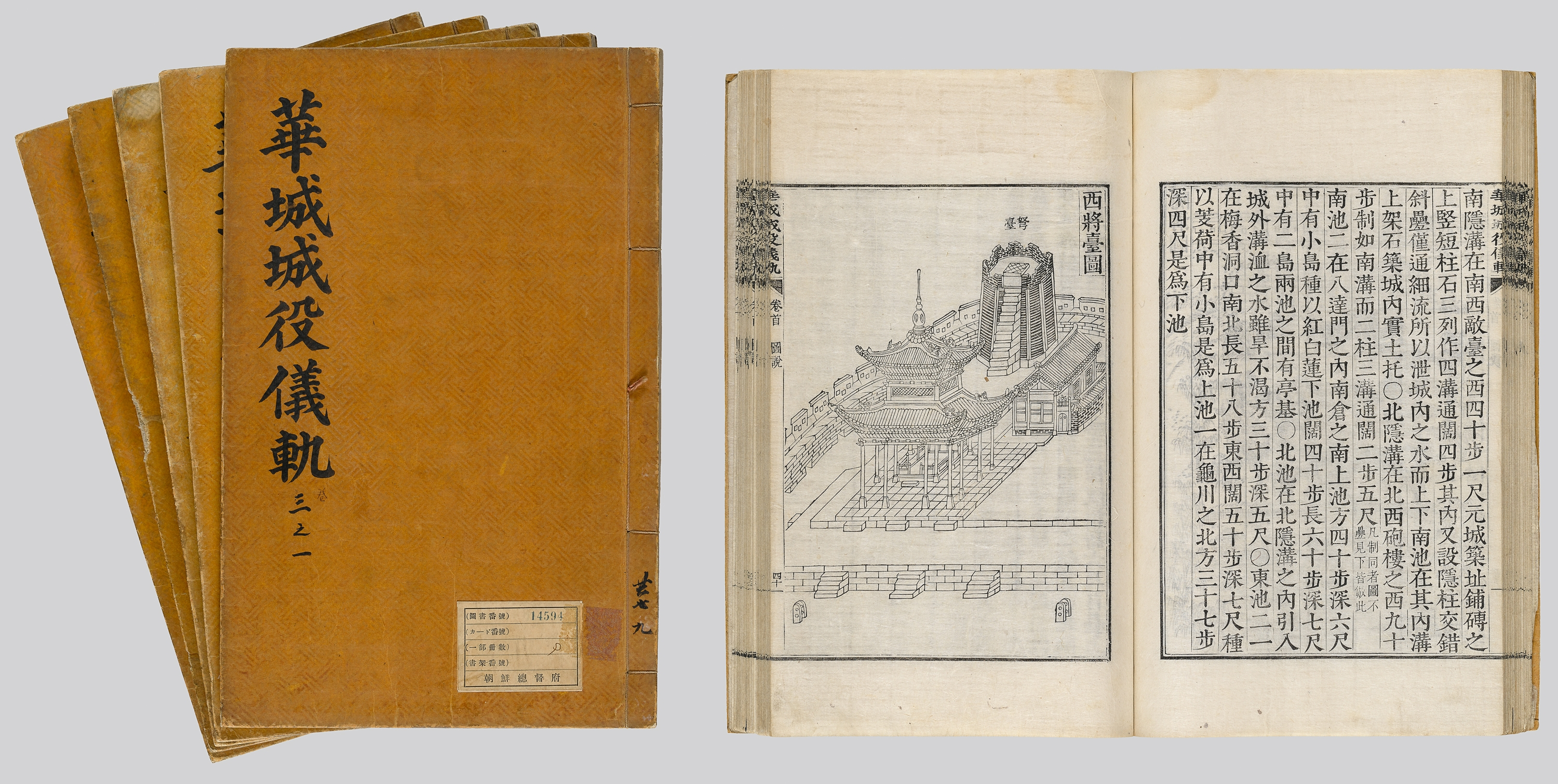
- The cover of the uigwe

Korean name
- Hangul: 화성성역의궤
- Hanja: 華城城役儀軌
- RR: Hwaseong seongyeok uigwe
- MR: Hwasŏng sŏngyŏk ŭigwe

Hwaseong seongyeok uigwe (Korean: 화성성역의궤; Hanja: 華城城役儀軌) is an uigwe that records the process of building the Hwaseong Fortress. This 10-page document comprising nine volumes meticulously records the construction process of the fortress.

== Description ==
King Jeongjo ordered comprehensive records to be kept documenting all aspects of the fortress construction from the beginning.

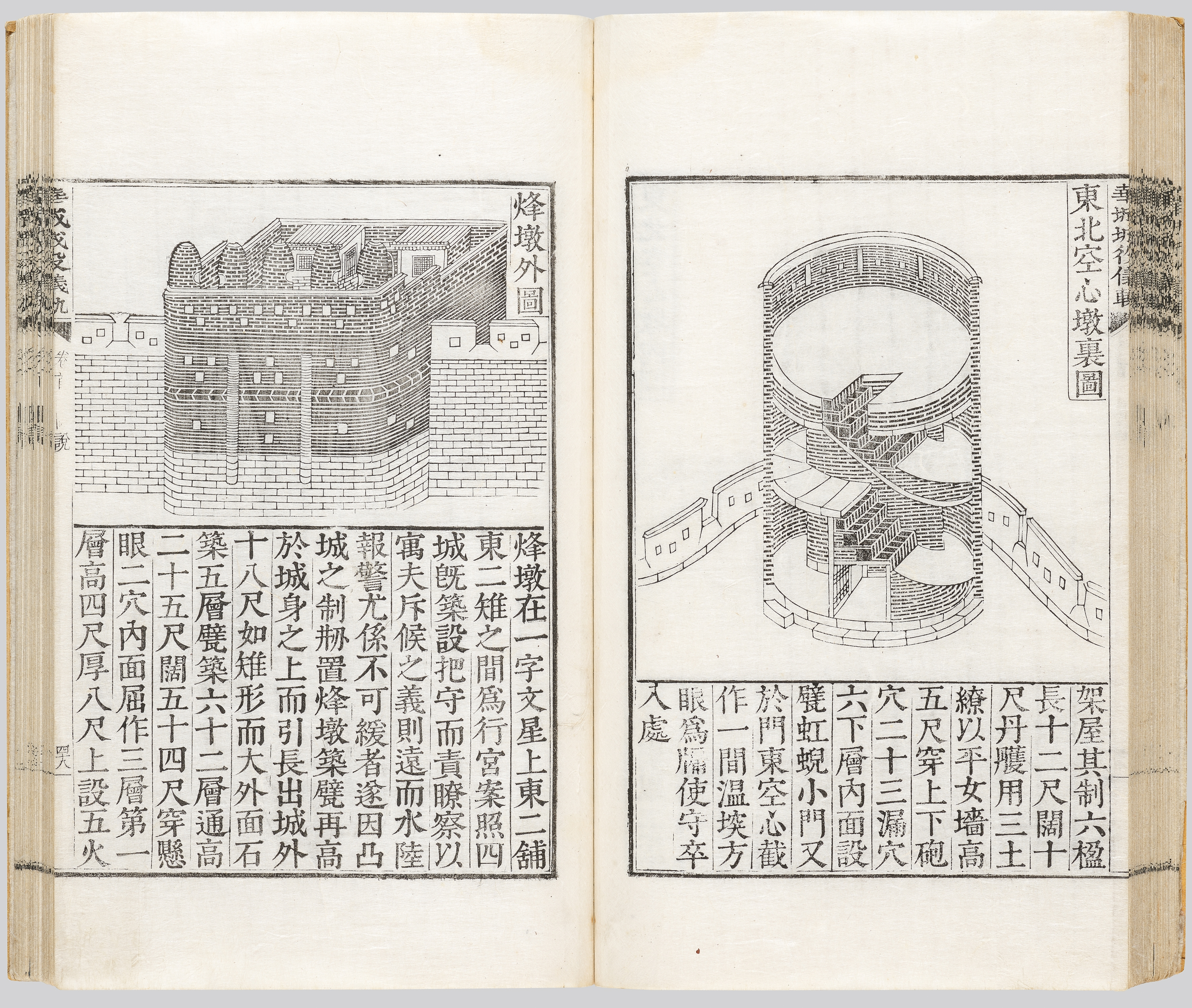
The detailed process is described with pictures.

The book contains detailed information about the construction process, including the number of workers, total cost, origin of wood and stone, machinery used, and construction techniques, along with illustrations. This book was published in the first year of King Sunjo of Joseon (1801), after the castle was completed.

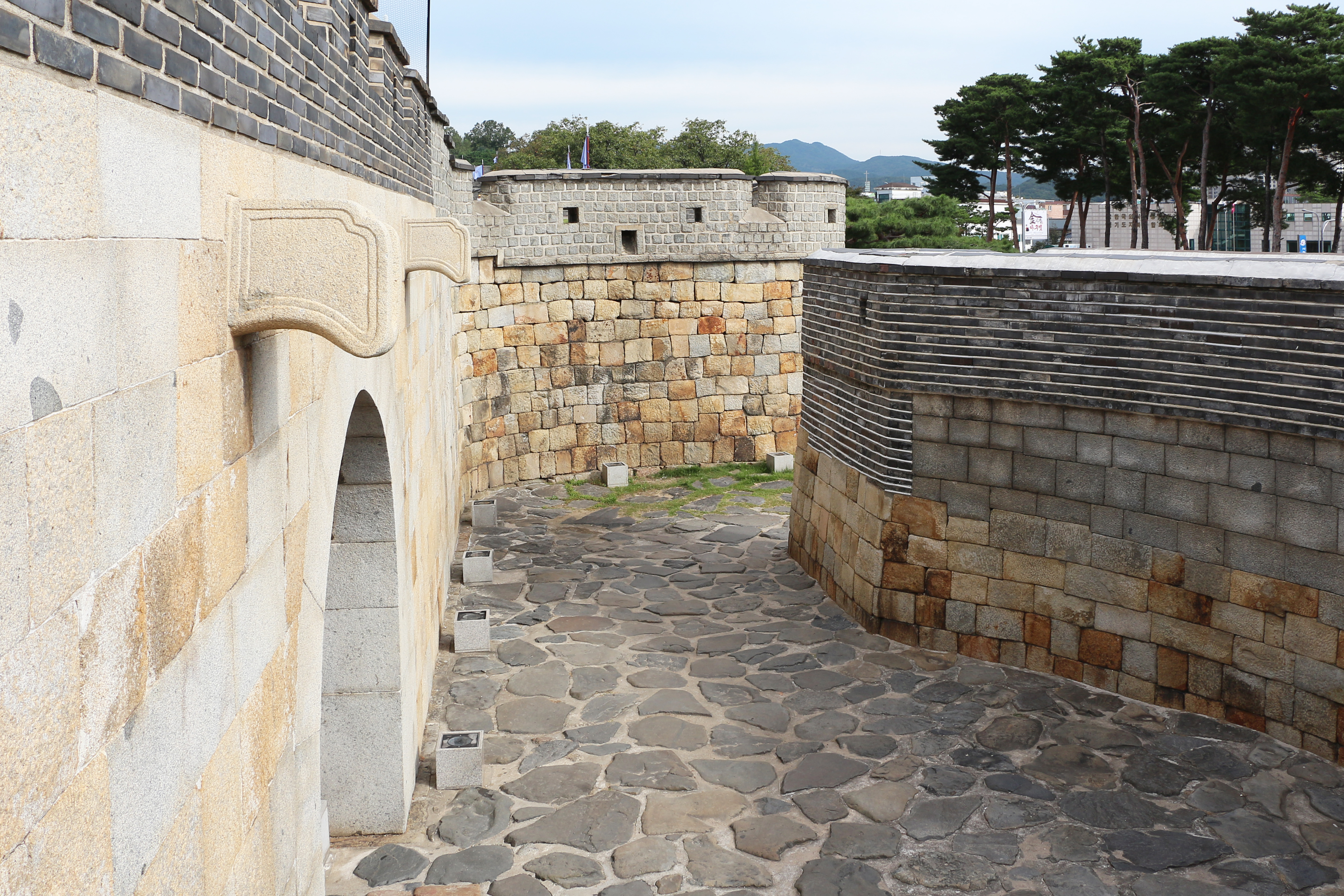
Hwaseong Fortress

From the late Joseon Dynasty to the Japanese colonial period and the Korean War, some areas of the fortress suffered extensive damage, but thanks to the detailed records recorded in Uigwe, the original structure, which had been destroyed, was successfully rebuilt through a five-year restoration plan from 1975 to 1979.

In 2007, this publication was included in the UNESCO Memory of the World Register.

== See also ==
- Veritable Records of the Joseon Dynasty
- Hwaseong Fortress
- Memory of the World Register – Asia and the Pacific
