= Dal Yong Jin =

South Korean media studies scholar

- Born: Suwon, South Korea
- Education: Yonsei University; University of Texas; University of Illinois at Urbana–Champaign
- Occupations: Distinguished SFU professor, School of Communication at Simon Fraser University
- Employer: Simon Fraser University

Korean name
- Hangul: 진달용
- RR: Jin Dalyong
- MR: Chin Taryong

Dal Yong Jin is a media studies scholar. He is Distinguished SFU professor in the School of Communication at Simon Fraser University, Vancouver, Canada where his research explores digital platforms, digital games, media history, political economy of communication, globalization and trans-nationalization, the Korean Wave, and science journalism. He has published more than 40 books and written more than 300 journal articles, book chapters, and book reviews. Jin has delivered numerous keynote speeches, conference presentations, invited lectures, and media interviews on subjects such as digital platforms, video games, globalization, transnational culture, and the Korean Wave.

He was awarded the Outstanding Scholar Award from the Korean American Communication Association at the KACA 40th Anniversary Conference in 2018, while receiving the Outstanding Research Award from the deputy prime minister and minister of education of South Korea. He was awarded the ICA Fellow designation, which primarily recognizes distinguished scholarly contributions at the International Communication Association Conference held in Paris in 2022. Jin was inducted into the RSC (Royal Society of Canada) Fellow in September 2026. Jin has been interviewed by international media outlets, including The Wall Street Journal, Elle, New York Times, The Washington Post, NBC, The Guardian, The Vancouver Sun, Chicago Tribune, The Telegraph, Wired, LA Times, and China Daily as one of the world’s leading scholars on Korean pop culture and these subject matters.

== Background and education ==
Jin was born in Suwon, South Korea. He attended Yonsei University. After working as a newspaper reporter for many years, he returned to academic work. He has a master's degree in Public Affairs from the University of Texas at Austin. In 2005, he received a Ph.D. degree from the Institute of Communications Research from the University of Illinois, Urbana-Champaign. He is the founding book series editor of Routledge Research in Digital Media and Culture in Asia, while directing The Transnational Culture and Digital Technology Lab.

== Academic career ==
Jin is the founding editor of a book series, Routledge Research in Digital Media and Culture in Asia, and editor of the Korean Journal of Communication. He is a fellow of the International Communication Association. Meanwhile, he is director of the Transnational Culture and Digital Technology Lab at Simon Fraser University.

Jin has developed several significant theories and conceptual frameworks, such as platform imperialism, de-convergence, and new Korean wave, as well as e-Sports. Sara Bannerman (2022) indeed said, "platform imperialism is a term developed, in a large part, by Jin (2013, 2015) at Simon Fraser University." His works have been received well in several fields, including political economy of communication, globalization, digital games, platform studies, and Asian media studies. In particular, as Vincent Mosco notes in his book, The Political Economy of Communication (2009), Jin has been known as a leading political economist. He has also been known as a cultural economist among some scholars, including Japanese media scholars, as indicated in Mechademia 1: Emerging Worlds of Anime and Manga. However, as indicated in his numerous publications, he used to integrate political economy, in terms of historical and structural approaches, and cultural studies, in terms of ethnography.

Jin's research has received a number of awards and grants from national and international associations, including the International Communication Association, the Social Sciences and Humanities Research Council of Canada, the National Research Foundation of Korea, the Korean American Communication Association, and the Academy of Korean Studies. He was nominated for the Young Scholar Award at the International Communication Association and was inducted as a Fellow of the International Communication Association in May 2022. His book titled Korea's Online Game Empire was nominated as the Book of the Year at the International Communication Association. Jin is the founding editor of a book series entitled Routledge Research in Digital Media and Culture in Asia.

== Publications ==
=== Books ===
- Jin, Dal Yong (2026). Misunderstanding the Korean Wave: Ten Debates on the Hallyu Mythology. London: Routledge.
- Jin, Dal Yong (2025). AI in Popular Culture: precarious creativity in the generative AI era. London: Routledge.
- Jin, Dal Yong and Kyong Yoon (eds) (2025). East Asian Media Culture in the Age of Digital Platforms. London: Routledge.
- Jin, Dal Yong. (2025). Cultural Production of Hallyu in the Digital Platform Era. Ann Arbor: MI: The University of Michigan Press.
- Lee, Sang Joon, Jin, Dal Yong, and Cho, Junhyeong (eds.) (2024). The South Korean Film Industry. Ann Arbor: MI: The University of Michigan Press.
- Kim, Seongcheol and Jin, Dal Yong (2024). Korea’s Digital Platform Empire: the emerging power in the global platform sphere. London: Routledge.
- Jin, Dal Yong (2023). Understanding the Korean Wave: Transnational Pop Culture and Digital Technologies. London: Routledge.
- Jin, Dal Yong (2022). Understanding Korean Webtoon Culture: Transmedia Storytelling, Digital Platforms, and Genres. Cambridge, MA: Harvard University Asia Center/ Harvard University Press.
- Jin, Dal Yong (2022). Global South Discourse in East Asian Media Studies. London: Routledge.
- Jin, Dal Yong (2022). Ten Debates on the Hallyu Mythology. (한류신화에 관한 10가지 논쟁). Seoul: Hanul Plus (in Korean).
- Jin, Dal Yong (2022). Understanding of Science Journalism (과학저널리즘 이해, in Korean) (2nd edition). Seoul: Hanul Plus.
- Jin, Dal Yong (2021). Artificial Intelligence in Cultural Production: critical perspectives in digital platforms. London: Routledge.
- Jin, Dal Yong (ed.)(2021).The Routledge Handbook of Digital Media and Globalization. London: Routledge.
- Jin, Dal Yong (ed.) (2021). Global Esports: Transformation of Cultural Perceptions of Competitive Gaming. London: Bloomsbury.
- Hong, Seok Kyeong and Dal Yong Jin (eds.) (2021). Transnational Convergence of East Asia Pop Culture. London: Routledge.
- Jin, Dal Yong, Kyong Yoon, and Wonjung Min (2021). Transnational Hallyu: The Globalization of Korean Digital and Popular Culture. London: Rowman & Littlefield.
- Jin, Dal Yong (ed.) (2020). Transmedia Storytelling in East Asia: The Age of Digital Media. London: Routledge.
- Jin, Dal Yong (2019). Transnational Korean Cinema: cultural politics, film genres, and digital technologies. Rutgers University Press.
- Jin, Dal Yong (2019). Globalization and Media in the Digital Platform Age. London: Routledge.
- Lee, Hark Joon and Dal Yong Jin (2019). K-Pop Idols: Popular Culture and the Emergence of the Korean Music Industry. Lanham, MD: Lexington.
- Jin, Dal Yong and Wendy Su (2019) (eds.). Asia-Pacific Film Co-productions: theory, industry and aesthetics. London: Routledge.
- Jin, Dal Yong and Kwak, Nojin (2018) (eds.). Communication, Digital Media, and Popular Culture in Korea: contemporary research and future prospects. Lanham MD: Lexington.
- Lee, Micky and Jin, Dal Yong (2017). Understanding the Business of Global Media in the Digital Age. London: Routledge.
- Yoon, Tae-jin, Jin, Dal Yong (2017) (eds.). The Korean Wave: evolution, fandom, and transnationality. Lanham, MD: Lexington.
- Jin, Dal Yong (2017). Smartland Korea: mobile communication, culture and society. Ann Arbor, MI: University of Michigan Press.
- Jin, Dal Yong (2016). (ed.). Mobile Gaming in Asia: Politics, Culture and Emerging Technologies. New York: Springer.
- Jin, Dal Yong (2016). New Korean Wave: transnational cultural power in the age of social media. Urbana, IL: University of Illinois Press.
- Jin, Dal Yong (2015). Digital Platforms, Imperialism and Political Culture. London: Routledge.
- Jin, Dal Yong (2015). Understanding of Science Journalism (과학저널리즘 이해, in Korean). Seoul: Hanul.
- Jin, Dal Yong (2013). De-Convergence of Global Media Industries. New York: Routledge
- Jin, Dal Yong (2011). Hands On/Hands Off: The Korean State and the Market Liberalization of the Communication Industry. Cresskill, NJ: Hampton Press.
- Winseck, Dwayne and Jin, Dal Yong (eds.) (2011). The Political Economies of Media: the transformation of the global media industries. London: Bloomsbury.
- Jin, Dal Yong (2011). Reinterpretation of Cultural Imperialism (문화제국주의의 재해석, in Korean). Seoul: Communication Books.
- Jin, Dal Yong (ed.) (2010). Global Media Convergence and Cultural Transformation: Emerging Social Patterns and Characteristics. Hershey, PA: IGI Global.
- Jin, Dal Yong (2010). Korea's Online Gaming Empire. Boston, MA: MIT Press.

=== Journal special issues ===
- Jin, Dal Yong. Netflix’s Influences on East Asian Audio-visual Culture (2024). Global Storytelling: Journal of Digital and Moving Images 4(2): 1-164.
- Jin, Dal Yong (2023). Theorizing the Korean Wave. International Journal of Communication 17: 1-170.
- Min, Won Jung and Dal Yong Jin (2022). Hallyu’s Storytelling in the Americas. Seoul Journal of Korean Studies 35(1): 1-95.
- Jin, Dal Yong and Lee, Hyang Soon (2020). Transnationality of Popular Culture in the Korean Wave. Korea Journal 61(1): 5-178.
- Jin, Dal Yong (2019). East Asian Perspective in Transmedia Storytelling. International Journal of Communication 13: 2085-2238.
- Jin, Dal Yong (2019). Transnationalism, Cultural Flows, and the Rise of the Korean Wave around the Globe. International Communication Gazette 81(2): 117-208.
- Jin, Dal Yong (2017). Digital Korea. Media, Culture and Society 39(5): 715-777.
- Jin, Dal Yong and Tae-jin Yoon (2017, Special Issue). In Retrospect of the Korean Wave: 20 Years and Prospect. International Journal of Communication 11: 2241-2386.
- Jin, Dal Yong and Florian Schneider (2016, Special Issue). The Dynamics of Digital Play in Asia. Asiascape: Digital Asia (DIAS) 3(1/2): 1-111.
- Jin, Dal Yong and Nissim Otmazgin (2014, Special Issue). The Emergence of Asian Cultural Industries: Policies, Strategies, and Trajectories. Pacific Affairs 87(1): 43-114.
- Jin, Dal Yong (2010, Special Issue). Games and Culture: Asia-Pacific Perspective. Iowa Journal of Communication 42(1): 1-94.
