= Nancy Abelmann =

American anthropologist (1959–2016)

- Born: 24 April 1959
- Died: 6 January 2016 (aged 56)
- Known for: Research on Korea, Korean Americans, transnational studies, and urban studies
- Title: Harry E. Preble Professor of Anthropology, Asian American Studies, and East Asian Languages and Cultures
- Awards: Helen Corley Petit Professorship (1998–1999); Leeds Prize (2005); Harry E. Preble Professorship (2007–2016); Im Seok-chae Award (2014)

Academic background
- Education: Harvard University; University of California, Berkeley

Academic work
- Institutions: University of Illinois Urbana-Champaign
- Notable works: The Melodrama of Mobility: Women, Class, and Talk in Contemporary South Korea

Nancy Abelmann (April 24, 1959 – January, 6, 2016) was an American anthropologist and Harry E. Preble Professor of anthropology, Asian American studies, and East Asian languages and cultures at the University of Illinois at Urbana-Champaign. where she'd also served as Associate Vice Chancellor for Research from 2009 to 2016, and as Director of the Center for East Asian and Pacific Studies from 2005 to 2008.

== Education and research ==
Nancy earned a bachelor's degree in East Asian Studies at Harvard University, and an M.A. and Ph.D. in anthropology from University of California, Berkeley. An anthropologist of Korea and of Korean Americans, she studied transnational and urban studies, film studies, Asian studies, Asian American studies, education, and gender studies. Her work, along with John Lie, Kathleen McHugh, Jung-ah Choi and So Jin Park, helped energize and shape Korean studies and Asian American studies over the past two decades.

Nancy was instrumental in the development of the Asian American Studies Program at the University of Illinois at Urbana-Champaign, as well as creating the Ethnography of the University Initiative with Peter Mortensen and Bill Kelleher in 2003 (a program where students can study different social institutions and cultures at the university). Unusually for an adult language-learner, she achieved near-native fluency in both Japanese and Korean.

From 2012 to 2014, she served as the president of the Society for Urban, National, and Transnational Anthropology.

== Awards ==
- Helen Corley Petit Professorship 1998-99
- 2005 Leeds Prize from the Society of Urban and Transnational Anthropology for The Melodrama of Mobility: Women, Class, and Talk in Contemporary South Korea, American Anthropological Association.
- 2014 Im Seok-chae Award from the Korean Society for Cultural Anthropology (for best translated book in Korean) for her 2003 monograph, The Melodrama of Mobility: Women, Class, and Talk in Contemporary South Korea from University of Hawaii Press.
- Harry E. Preble Professorship 2007-2016

== Works ==
- Making Family Work: How Korean American Teens and Parents Navigate Immigrant America (with Sumie Okazaki). NYU Press, 2018.
- South Korea’s Education Exodus: The Life and Times of Early Study Abroad (second editor, with Adrienne Lo, Soo Ah Kwon, and Sumie Okazaki). University of Washington Press, 2017.
- No Alternative?: Experiments in South Korean Education (co-edited with Jung-ah Choi and So Jin Park). Berkeley: Global, Area, and International Archive. University of California Press, 2012.
- The Intimate University: Korean American Students and the Problems of Segregation. Duke University Press, 2009.
- South Korean Golden Age Melodrama: Gender, Genre, and National Cinema (co-edited with Kathleen McHugh). Wayne State University Press, 2005.
- The Melodrama of Mobility: Women, Class, and Talk in Contemporary South Korea. University of Hawaii Press, 2003. Korean translation published in 2014.
- Echoes of the Past, Epics of Dissent: A South Korean Social Movement. Berkeley, CA: University of California Press, 1996.
- Blue Dreams: Korean Americans and the Los Angeles Riots (with John Lie). Cambridge, MA: Harvard University Press, 1995.
