= Uigwe =

15th century Joseon historical documents

- The cover of the Mount Odaesan archive copy of the Uigwe for the funeral of Empress Myeongseong

Korean name
- Hangul: 의궤
- Hanja: 儀軌
- RR: uigwe
- MR: ŭigwe

Uigwe (Korean: 의궤; Hanja: 儀軌) is the generic name given to a collection of approximately 3,895 books recording in detail the royal rituals and ceremonies of the Joseon dynasty of Korea. There is no generally agreed English translation for the title of the work; some scholars suggest "book of state rites", while the Glossary of Korean Studies from the Korea Foundation suggests "manual of the state event" or "rubrica for a state ceremony." The expression "Royal Protocols" (of the Joseon Dynasty) is widely used.

The collection of Uigwe was inscribed in UNESCO's Memory of the World International Register in 2007, recognising it as documentary heritage of global importance.

The term "Uigwe" is not easily translated. It refers to a collection of rites, protocols, codes and rules. Thus, the Joseon Sijeong Uigwe are the “Protocols” or legal “Code” of the Joseon Sijeong. The Joseon Sijeong Uigwe was compiled under the reign of King Sejong (ruled 1418 to 1450).

King Sejong is credited for organizing a body of scholars that consolidated, refined and codified various laws, practices, beliefs and the accepted Confucius systems into law. The Joseon Sijeong Uigwe was compiled into an volumes, similar, to a modern encyclopedia. Volumes included comprehensive criminal, civil, administrative and tax laws.

== Content ==
Combining text and detailed illustrations, each Uigwe preserves the records of the Superintendency (dogam), set up temporarily to plan and carry out special state rites. These rites included investitures, coronations, weddings, banquets, the painting of royal portraits, funerals and ancestral rites. Each Uigwe, some in several volumes with several copies, was written either by hand but more often printed using woodblocks for the History Archive copies. Most of the Uigwe, had one exclusive edition for the king, distinguished by silk covers, high quality paper, binding, superior handwriting and overall presentation, was intended to serve as the royal viewing copy. The silk covers used exclusively for the king were made of quality silk, had superior patterns often of clouds, and usually had red decorations around its borderline. Four to nine other copied version for scholars were kept for each of the four state archives, which for most of the Joseon period were located on Mount Jeongjoksan on Ganghwa-do Island; Mount Jeoksang in Muju-gun County, Jeollabuk-do Province; Mount Odaesan in Gangwon-do Province and Mount Taebaeksan in Yeongwol-gun County. The Uigwe for funerals and weddings includes large and detailed images of processions, often involving thousands of participants.

== Looting and repatriation ==
=== 1866: French troops ===
In 1782, the Outer Gyujanggak library (known as Oe-Gyujang-gak) was built in the ancient royal palace on Ganghwa-do Island to accommodate an overflow of books from the main Gyujanggak library at Changdeokgung Palace in Seoul, where the royal viewing copies were kept, and most of the viewing copies were transferred there. In 1866, after the execution of a number of French Catholic missionaries in Korea, a French expeditionary force came from China to seek explanations, resulting in the French campaign against Korea. Unable to gain access to the authorities, the troops attacked Ganghwa-do Island and seized the royal books, along with a vast amount of silverware and other royal artifacts. The books were kept at the Bibliothèque nationale de France in Paris soon after their arrival in France. They were largely forgotten until Korean scholar, Park Byeongseon, discovered them in 1975, whilst working there as a librarian.

Following the discovery, the return was officially requested in 1992. In 1993, then-French President François Mitterrand returned one copy during a visit to Seoul to sell its high-speed TGV train technology; with the promised to return the remaining collection. The Korean Government tried to retrieve the royal documents through a permanent lease, since French law prohibits national assets to be transferred abroad. In 2010, a Seoul-based civic group spearhead the return but the request to exclude illegally obtained property from its list of national assets was rejected by a Paris court.

After a series of long disputes and negotiations, an agreement was made by President Lee Myung-bak and President Nicolas Sarkozy at the 2010 G-20 Seoul summit to return the documents on a five-year renewable loan basis. From April to June 2011, 297 volumes with 191 different Uigwes, were shipped back in four separate installments.

=== 1922: Japanese Occupation Period ===
In 1922, during the Korea under Japanese rule, many volumes of books including 167 of Uigwe, along with some 1,000 other relics, stored at the royal Gyujanggak library at Changdeokgung Palace and history archive in the Buddhist temple at Mount Odaesan were transferred to the University of Tokyo. As they were stored at the University of Tokyo, they were not included in the list of artifacts to be returned compiled in 1965, when the two countries signed a treaty which normalized diplomatic ties.

In November 2008, Seoul Metropolitan Council passed a resolution urging Japan to return the Uigwe. The looted collection included Empress Myeongseong's state funeral protocol, that lasted for about two years following her murder by Japanese assassins in Gyeongbokgung Palace in 1895.

In August 2010, then-Japanese Prime Minister Naoto Kan announced the return of the Uigwe to mark the centenary of Japanese annexation of Korea. Then in October 2011, Prime Minister Yoshihiko Noda returned five copies during his visit to Seoul in a bid to improve relations. The copies chronicled the royal rituals of King Gojong and King Sunjong, the last two emperors of Joseon dynasty and Korean Empire before Korea was annexed in 1910. This was followed, after a 16-month process, by the return of 1,200 volumes including 150 Uigwe in December 2011.

== Collection and exhibition ==
The Uigwe that remained in Korea were preserved and housed in the Gyujanggak library at Seoul National University, and as part of the Jangseogak collection at Academy of Korean Studies. Gyujanggak library has the largest collection, with 2,940 volumes with 546 different Uigwe; while the latter has 490 volumes with 287 different Uigwe.

=== National Museum of Korea ===
The 297 copies of the Uigwe's that were returned from France, are housed at the National Museum of Korea, where a special exhibition, The Return of the Oegyujanggak Uigwe from France: Records of the State Rites of the Joseon Dynasty, was held from 19 July to 18 September 2011.

In June 2011, ahead of the exhibition, the Museum showcased five of the copies to the media. They were selected for their historical significance and to demonstrate the wide range of activities recorded in different kinds of Uigwe. They were:

- Uigwe for a Royal Feast (1630)
- Uigwe for the Ceremony of Offering Honorable Names to Queen Jangryeol (1686)
- Uigwe for the State Funeral of Queen Jangryeol (1688)
- Uigwe for the Funeral of Uiso, the Eldest Grandson of the King (1752)
- Uigwe for the Construction of the West Palace (1831)

The Uigwe for a Royal Feast is the oldest copy that was looted by the French. It recorded the royal feast held by King Injo of Joseon in March 1630, wishing for longevity and good health for Queen Dowager Inmok. It is also one of the few "copied" versions as most of them are reportedly original editions that were exclusively printed for the king. The museum stated that three of the five shown do not have any surviving copied versions. Also a couple of silk covers of other volumes were displayed separately as Bibliothèque nationale de France removed 286 of them for restoration in the 1970s. The covers were returned along with the 297 volumes.

=== National Palace Museum of Korea ===
The copies that were returned by Japan are housed at the National Palace Museum of Korea with a special exhibition from 27 December 2011 to 5 February 2012.

== Media ==
To mark the return of the stolen Uigwe on 2011 by French Government, a special episode of Running Man (Episode 48) was aired. In this episode, the Running Man members have to find "the sleeping Uigwe" that was stored in the underground section. Song Ji-hyo won this episode.

== See also ==
- History of Korea
- Annals of the Joseon Dynasty
- Donggwoldo
- Joseon Dynasty politics
