= Namhi Kim Wagner =

Korean-American Language Instructor and Ceramicist

- Born: 1923; Korea
- Died: March 2023 (aged 99–100)
- Alma mater: Ochanomizu University
- Occupation: University teacher (1964–1995), ceramist
- Employer: Harvard University (1964–1995); Harvard–Yenching Library (1961–1964)
- Spouse(s): Edward Willett Wagner

Namhi Kim Wagner (1923 – March 2023) was a university instructor and Harvard University's first Korean Language Program Director. Her ceramics are influenced by Buncheong style and she is said to be one of the first American ceramicists to revive the Buncheong style of ceramics. Her work is in the Museum of Fine Arts, Boston's collection and the Harvard Art Museums' collection.

== Early and personal life ==
In 1923, she was born in Korea. She grew up in Japan and graduated from Ochanomizu University in Tokyo, Japan. She married an editor of The Korea Times – Choi Byung-woo. In 1958, Byung-woo died while he was working as a war correspondent during the Second Taiwan Strait Crisis. She had three children with Byung-woo. She has three daughters – Yunghi Choi, Sokhi Choi Wagner, and Sanghi Choi Wagner. In 1961, she immigrated to the United States and married Edward Willett Wagner.

== Harvard ==
She began working at the Harvard-Yenching Library in 1961. In 1964, she started teaching in Harvard's Korean Language Program. In 1965, she became the program's first Program Director and she retired from the position in 1995.

== Ceramics ==
In 1971, she started studying ceramics at the Massachusetts Institute of Technology's Pottery Studio. In 1975, her work was on display in an exhibit titled Clay, which featured the work of undergraduate students at the Radcliffe Pottery Studio (which became the Harvard Ceramics Program). From 1997 to 2004, she was an artist-in-residence at the Harvard Ceramics Program. On June 16, 2010, the Museum of Fine Arts in Boston accessioned one of her original ceramic pieces for their collection. In the spring of 2016, her ceramic work was on display at the Harvard-affiliated art exhibition center – Gallery 224. In 2020, the Harvard Art Museums accessioned an original ceramic bowl Wagner had made into its collections.

In addition to making her own ceramics, she also donated several pieces of antique Korean ceramics from her own collection to the Harvard Art Museums that date back to the Koryŏ dynasty and Chosŏn dynasty.

== Death and legacy ==
In 2022, Harvard's Korean Program honored Wagner by naming the Namhi Kim Wagner Korean Language Prize after her. She died March 2023 at age 99. In the summer of 2023, the Lexington Arts & Craft Society hosted a Memorial Retrospective Ceramics Exhibition of Wagner's ceramics.

== External Resources ==
- Photographs of Wagner's 2016 Exhibit at Gallery 224
