= The Korean Studies Institute =

Korean cultural studies institute

- 한국국학진흥원
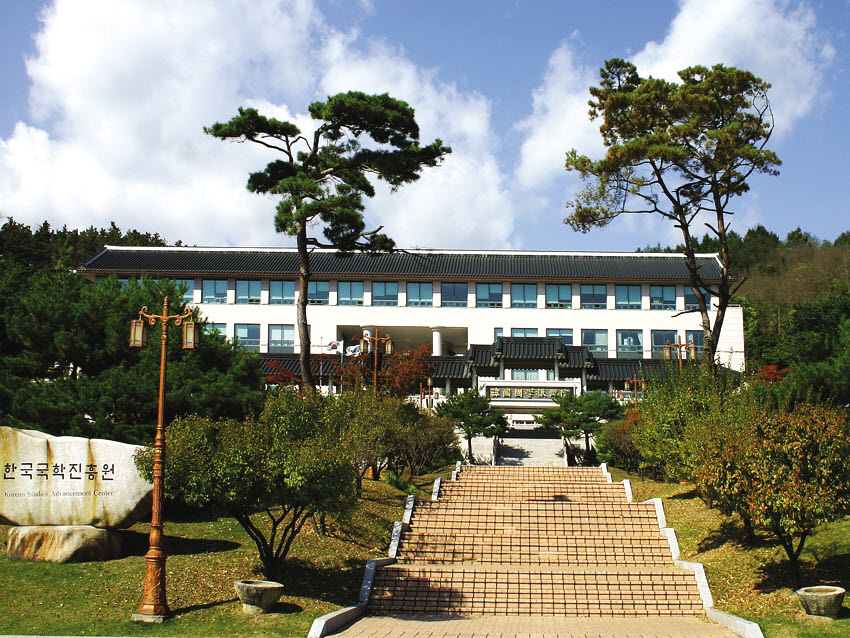
- Formation: December 7, 1995
- Location: 1997 Toegyero, Andong, North Gyeongsang Province, South Korea
- Coordinates: 36.7022°N 128.8106°E
- President: Chong Jong-sup
- Website: www.koreastudy.or.kr
- Formerly called: Korean Studies Advancement Center; The Advanced Center for Korean Studies

Korean name
- Hangul: 한국국학진흥원
- Hanja: 韓國國學振興院
- RR: Hanguk gukhak jinheungwon
- MR: Han'guk kukhak chinhŭngwŏn

The Korean Studies Institute (Korean: 한국국학진흥원) was founded in 1995 as a non-profit foundation under the affiliation of the Ministry of Culture, Sports and Tourism. Located in Andong, it conducts research, conservation, collection and studies on Korean archives owned by private individuals which were at risk of loss of damage over time.
