= Bang hallim jeon =

Korean novel

Bang Hanrim jeon (方翰林傳 The Tale of the Woman Scholar Bang Gwanju) is a work of female hero fiction that focuses on the life of a woman, Bang Gwanju, who disguises herself as a man and is active in the public sphere. The female protagonist, Bang Gwanju, fights in a war and takes the civil service examination, even becoming betrothed to another woman while retaining her family surname, and thus displays many of the defining characteristics of the female hero fiction as a literary genre. This work has been reviewed as the most controversial of all works of female hero fiction. This is because the female protagonist and the woman she marries act in accordance with a perpetual self-awareness that they live in a patriarchal society where women are oppressed. Bang Gwanju hides her identity as a woman in her daily life and pursues masculine values while living as a man. Yeong Hyebing, the woman she marries, represents traditional feminine values in faithfully carrying out the role of a wife and a mother while seeking an equal relationship in their marriage.

== Authorship ==
The author and original date of creation is unknown, but the author is presumed to be a woman that originally wrote the work sometime in the nineteenth century.

== Plot ==
During the Ming Dynasty, a girl named Bang Gwanju is born in Beijing, China. Although she was born as a biological female, from a young age, she wears boys’ clothes on her own initiative and studies matters that are not traditionally considered “feminine,” instead pursuing male-gendered activities such as studying the Siseo (詩書 Odes and the Histories) and military strategies. Her parents follow her lead and introduce their child as a son to other people. Her parents pass away when she is eight years old and after the three-year mourning period, she wanders the country and views all the mountains and streams for one year. When she is twelve years old, she takes the civil service examination and wins first place in the field of literary and martial arts. Yeong Hyebing is the youngest daughter of Yeong Huijeong, the Minister of Defense. Yeong Hyebin laments the life of a woman regulated by a man and vows to never get married. Yeong Huijeong tries to marry off his daughter and Bang Gwanju meets Yeong Hyebing in person. Immediately perceiving Young Hyebin’s outstanding character, Bang Gwanju resolves to marry her. Yeong Hyebing immediately recognizes that Bang Gwanju is a woman and on their wedding day, she sets out to discover Bang Gwanju’s true intentions. As soon as she discovers Bang Gwanju’s true identity, the two women swear to keep the secret so that Bang Gwanju lives the life of a man and Yeong Hyebing, although she breaks her original vow to never get married, does not live the life of a regular woman controlled by her husband. Bang Gwanju is appointed to a government post and a few years later, she is dispatched to the provinces and separates from Yeong Hyebing. While in the provinces, Gwanju decides to explore the nearby mountains and streams when a bolt of lightning suddenly strikes. She goes to the spot where the bolt of lightning hit the ground and there, finds a child with the words “nakseong” (落星 fallen star) engraved on his chest. She thus names him “Nakseong” and takes him home with her. One year later, Bang Gwanju is promoted to a position in the Ministry of Defense and returns to Seoul where she is reunited with Yeong Hyebing and they decide to raise Nakseong as their own son. Afterwards, the royal court is sent into a disarray through the actions of a group of traitorous subjects and the Northern barbarians simultaneously decide to attack China. Bang Gwanju is made into the commander-in-chief of the army and goes to fight in the war, where she defeats the King of the barbarians and receives his capitulation. The Emperor thus appoints Bang Gwanju as his feudal lord and Yeong Hyebing is bestowed with the honor of being a feudal lord’s wife. When their son, Bang Nakseong, turns twelve years old, he becomes engaged to Kim Hui’s daughter and takes the civil service examination, receiving first place. His wife, Madame Kim, has a son and names him “Hyeon.” Bang Nakseong is promoted to the Ministry of Defense. One day, an ascetic from Mount Heng comes to find them and reads Bang Gwanju’s physiognomy. After predicting that she will die before the age of 40, he forever disappears. In the spring of the following year, Bang Gwanju suddenly becomes ill and has a premonition that she will soon die. She thus sends a message to the Emperor revealing her true identity as a woman and at the age of 39, passes away with Yeong Hyebing following and dying shortly afterwards.

== Features and Significance ==
Of all works of female hero fiction, Bang Hanrim jeon remains the most problematic. This is because both Bang Gwanju and Yeong Hyebing, the two women of the story, are fully aware of the oppression that women face in a patriarchal society and actively seek to ameliorate or escape this situation. Bang Gwanju, aspiring to masculine values, disguises herself as a man and is active in the public sphere, eventually being appointed to a high position in public office. Moreover, she marries another woman and adopts a son, bequeathing her family name to an heir and continuing the family lineage. In this manner, Bang Gwanju achieves fame and prestige and maintains a heteronormative consciousness of the family, fulfilling the values ascribed by a patriarchal ideology. Unlike other works of female hero fiction, where upon discovery of the female protagonist’s true identity as a woman, they revert to life as a woman, Bang Gwanju practically lives the entirety of her life as a man until her death and never returns to the life of a woman. This emphasizes the way Bang Gwanju seeks to achieve equality with men by adopting or assimilating to a male identity.

Yeong Hyebing rejects the thought of being placed in a hierarchical marriage relationship and refuses to get married, but when she meets Bang Gwanju, she immediately realizes her true identity as a woman. As soon as she confirms that they can have a marriage based on equality, she changes her mind and decides to get married. After they get married, Yeong Hyebing dutifully fulfills her roles as a wife to Bang Gwanju and mother to their adopted son. But she does not stop there; whenever Bang Gwanju attempts to assert some kind of patriarchal control over her, Yeong Hyebing quickly admonishes her and she actively works to keep Bang Gwanju’s secret and maintain an equal relationship between the two of them. Thus, Yeong Hyebing affirms and maintains her feminine values, preserving a fundamental difference between men and women, and by showing this in a positive manner, she concurrently demonstrates the possibility of becoming equal with men. Bang Hanrim jeon juxtaposes Bang Gwanju, who thoroughly pursues masculine values and materializes her autonomy, and Yeong Hyebing, who pursues autonomy and equality with Bang Gwanju through the embodiment of feminine values, and thereby demonstrates the reciprocal unity of masculine values and feminine values. These characteristics are significant in that they demonstrate a viable direction for the feminist movement.

== Bibliographic Information ==
There are currently three extant copies of the story: Nakseong jeon (落星傳 The Tale of Nakseong) in the personal collection of Jeong Byeonguk (a scholar of Korean literature); Bang Hanrim jeon that is the personal copy of Kim Donguk, a professor of Korean literature that was also known by the name “Nason 羅孫” (now in the Nason Library Collection at Dankook University’s Yulgok Library); Ssangwan gibong (雙婉奇逢 The Strange Meeting of a Couple) in the Academy of Korean Studies collection. All of them are handwritten manuscripts in hangeul, the Korean alphabet. There is virtually no difference in content between the three versions. However, their titles are different, with Bang Hanrim jeon referring to Bang Gwanju’s job (as a scholar), Nakseong jeon referring to their adopted son, and Ssangwan gibong referring to the strange way in which Bang Gwanju and Yeong Hyebing meet. In the case of Nakseong jeon, there is a note that states “So Sojeo transcribed this work in the gyemi (癸未) year.” As the gyemi year refers to 1883 and So Sojeo is a woman’s name, we can infer that the work was published in 1883 and that a woman transcribed it.
