= Seol Sojeo jeon =

Korean novel

Seol jeo jeon (薛小姐傳 The Tale of Seol Sojeo) is a fictional work that centers around a female protagonist, Seol Sojeo who disguises herself as a man to get revenge on her father's behalf. After she takes the civil service examination and is appointed to a government position, she finally avenges her father by taking down his enemy. Because it features a woman that ventures out from the domestic space and actively participates in the public sphere, Seol jeo jeon is classified as a work of female hero fiction. Unlike other works of female hero fiction, the female protagonist in Seol jeo jeon does not directly fight in battle nor does she possess any kind of awareness regarding gender. However, because it was created in the late seventeenth century (the early period in the history of classical Korean literature), it is significant in that it demonstrates the formative period for the female hero fiction as a literary genre.

== Authorship ==
The author and original date of creation are both unknown, but the author is presumed to be a woman and the date of creation is estimated to be sometime around the late seventeenth century. "Okso" Gwon Seop (權燮, 1671–1759)’s collection of writings, Oksogo (玉所稿 The Writings of Okso) contains the story, Beon Seolgyeong jeon (翻薛卿傳 The Tale of Beon Seolgyeong) which is a translation of Seol gyeong jeon into classical Chinese. Seol gyeong jeon is the same work as Seol Sojeo jeon (薛小姐傳 The Tale of Seol Sojeo). As the work was translated in 1724 (in the eighteenth century), it can be presumed that Seol jeo jeon was originally written sometime before then—around the latter half of the seventeenth century.

== Plot ==
During the reign of Emperor Renzong of the Song dynasty in China, there was a man named Seol Munbaek who held a government position in the Ministry of Personnel. After he began his government position, he had a daughter named Wolae whose spirit was as excellent and outstanding as that of a hero's. At the age of three, Wolae's mother passes away. Her father does not remarry and Wolae, when she turns ten years old, starts to manage their household all on her own as efficiently and capably as an adult. One day, Choe Hun, a powerful man within the royal cart, sends a request to Seol Munbaek to arrange a marriage between Seol Wolae and his son. However, Seol Munbaek rejects this request and Choe Hun becomes spiteful and starts to harbor a desire for revenge. Afterwards, Choe Hun attempts to rape Lady Jeong, the wife of Confucian Scholar Yi Hyeon, but Lady Jeong escapes, managing to leave behind a letter written in her blood before she commits suicide. Upon hearing of Yi Hyeon's circumstances, Seol Munbaek writes an appeal to the king calling for the punishment of Choe Hun. Choe Hun's brother-in-law discovers Seol Munbaek's plan and informs Choe Hun who proceeds to falsely accuse Seol Munbaek instead. Seol Munbaek is thus banished to the North Sea. Seol Wolae, now alone, is coerced by Choe Hun into marrying his son. She pretends to accept her fate, but instead sends her devoted maid in her place to get married. After the nuptials, she and her maid, Yeohwan, disguise themselves as men and escape to Cheongam Temple where Seol Wolae begins studying military strategies and the martial arts. One day, a person visits the temple and is impressed by Seol Wolae's immense spirit and strength and recommends that she take the civil service examination. To clear her father's name from the false charge, Seol Wolae changes her name to "Seolgyeong" and takes the civil service examination. After she places first in the examination, she sends a message to the king informing him of the situation between her father and Choe Hun. The king comes to learn the truth and thus banishes Choe Hun and extols the chastity and faithfulness of Madame Jeong, who committed suicide to protect her virtue. He also releases Seol Munbaek from his sentence of exile and decides to make Seol Wolae his son-in-law. Seol Wolae first goes to retrieve her father from his place of exile, and then proceeds to send a message to the emperor revealing her true identity as a woman and humbly begs for his forgiveness. The king is impressed by her and marries her to the crown prince while also promoting Seol Munbaek to a higher government position. Seol Wolae has eight boys and three girls and dies shortly after her husband passes away.

== Features and Significance ==
Unlike other works of female hero fiction, the female protagonist of Seol jeo jeon does not fight in a war nor demonstrate a clear consciousness of gender and gender roles. However, the story was written in the latter half of the seventeenth century (in the early period within the history of classical Korean literature) and portrays a diverse range of problems from the perspective of a woman. In this sense, Seol jeo jeon can be seen as influencing later works of female hero fiction and their creation. The depiction of Seol Wolae's father is also remarkable in that he refuses to remarry, even after his wife dies, because he fears that it will be detrimental to his daughter. That is, his consideration of a woman's circumstances is behavior rarely seen in works of female hero fiction, let alone within other works of classical Korean literature. Above all else, this work emphasizes that, in a patriarchal society, the most violent and dangerous incident that can occur to a woman is rape. For instance, the story depicts the villainous Choe Hun attempting to rape a married woman, causing her to commit suicide. The portrayal of a married woman's rape connotes the oppression and contradictions faced by women in a patriarchal society. Specifically, while men use their power and strength to oppress women, the ideology of "chastity" also pressures women into remaining "pure" and faithful to one man for their entire lives. Thus, the story's representation of a married woman's rape raises problems based on women's real-life circumstances.

However, the "good" character's (Seol Munbaek) failure in bringing the rapist to justice shows the absence of any kind of male figure capable of solving the issues surrounding rape. Although Seol Wolae, in disguising herself as a man and stepping out into the public sphere, avenges the married woman's rape, it is not her explicit goal from the outset—rather, it is a side-effect of Seol Wolae punishing Choe Hun for his action and yet, it ultimately contributes to resolving some of the problems in a male-centric society. Seol Wolae's actions, motivated by a sense of filial duty, can thus be interpreted as the novelistic embodiment of women's stories in classical texts on ethics such as Samgang haengsil do (三綱行實圖 Illustrated Guide to the Three Relations) and Yeollyeo jeon (列女傳 Five Biographies of Faithful Woman). Nevertheless, Seol jeo jeon helped weaken prejudices regarding women's skills and gender roles, likely becoming the foundation for the clearer awareness of gender seen in later works of female hero fiction.

== Bibliographic Information ==
There are currently eleven different extant copies Seol jeo jeon that have been discovered thus far. With the exception of Beon Seolgyeong jeon, which is a translation of the original text into classical Chinese, the other ten copies are handwritten manuscripts in hangeul, the Korean alphabet. Two copies are currently held at Seoul University's Kyujanggak Institute for Korean Studies in the Garam Collection (the donated materials from Professor "Garam" Yi Byeonggi's personal collections). One of these copies is known as the "Garam A" version. The translation by Gwon Seop into classical Chinese is likely the closest to the original text, and while Seol jeo jeon was originally written in hangeul, it appears to correspond in every way (including in terms of content) to the classical Chinese translation, which can be confirmed through the "Garam A" version. The handwritten manuscript versions of Seol jeo jeon have diverse titles, including Syeoljye jyeon (셜졔젼), Seolbi hyohaeng rok (설비효행록), Chunghyorok (충효록), and Uiyeol bi chunghyo rok (의열비충효록). The majority of the existing copies of the manuscript are titled Uiyeol bi chunghyo rok, with a total of eight copies with this title. Uiyeol bi chunghyo rok emphasizes the female protagonist's sense of filial duty. Beon Seolgyeong jeon, which is a translation of the original title into classical Chinese, also means "translation of Seolgyeong jeon" and thus, there is a high possibility that the original title of the work was Seolgyeong jeon. "Seolgyeong" is the name the female protagonist chooses when she takes the civil service examination and is not her original name. Thus, researchers created the title Seol jeo jeon which means Seol Sojeo—her original name.
