= Hong Gyewol jeon =

Korean work of fiction

Hong Gyewol jeon (洪桂月傳 The Tale of Hong Gyewol) is a work of female hero fiction that tells the story of Hong Gyewol, who is a woman that disguises herself as a man and proceeds to fight in numerous battles, take the civil service examination, and is active in the public sphere. Hong Gyewol jeon is unique for its gender consciousness, in that it is structured as a kind of “battle of the sexes” between the female and male protagonists to ultimately emphasize the superiority of women. Moreover, the work distinguishes itself through the ways in which the female protagonist demonstrates an androgyny that harmoniously embodies both masculine and feminine qualities.

== Authorship ==
The author and original publication period are both unknown, but the author is considered to be a woman and it is estimated to have been written sometime within the 19th century.

== Plot ==
During the reign of China's Ming dynasty, there is a man named Hong Mu from a noble and renowned family. At a late age, he and his wife finally have a child: a daughter, named Hong Gyewol. One day, Hong Mu hears a prophecy that when Gyewol turns five years old, she will be separated from her parents, only to be reunited when she is eighteen. Just in case, Hong Mu dresses Gyewol in boy's clothing and makes sure she receives an education to prepare for the prophecy's possible realization. When Gyewol is five years old, a revolt breaks out in the land. Her father is caught in the ensuing chaos and disappears. As a result, Madame Yang, his wife and Gyewol's mother, takes Gyewol and tries to escape, but they run into a group of bandits. Madame Yang is kidnapped and the bandits throw Gyewol into a river. Although Madame Yang manages to later escape, she is unable to find Gyewol. By chance, Gyewol is saved by a person named Master Yeo, who treats Gyewol like a boy and sends her to study with Taoist Master Kwak along with his own son, Boguk. Meanwhile, her father, Hong Mu, is captured and held hostage by the traitorous rebels, but is later deemed as having participated in treason and is banished to an island. Madame Yang hears the news about her husband's exile and proceeds to track him down, afterwards living together with him on the island.

Through her studies, Gyewol learns various military strategies and tactics, and Master Kwak believes that Gyewol will one day conquer the whole world, causing him to bestow her with the name “Pyeongguk.” Over the course of their education, Gyewol manages to prove herself superior in skill and talent, in every way, to Boguk. Master Kwak instructs the two of them to take the civil service examination, with Gyewol passing as first place and Boguk passing as second.

When another rebellion breaks out, Gyewol is appointed as general and Boguk is appointed as her adjutant. While Gyewol defeats the enemies deftly and easily, Boguk is surrounded by the enemy forces and needs to be rescued by Gyewol. The rebels escape and head towards the island where Gyewol's parents reside. Gyewol pursues them and manages to round up all the enemies and soundly defeat them when, in a dramatic fashion, she is suddenly reunited with her parents. Afterwards, the king rewards Gyewol and Boguk by appointing Gyewol as a feudal lord and Boguk as a minister, a rank lower. He also provides public positions to Gyewol's parents, as well as Master Yeo and his wife for raising and looking after Gyewol. All of a sudden, Gyewol becomes ill and the king sends the royal physician, Taeui, to diagnose and treat her, upon which the doctor discovers that she is, in fact, a woman. Knowing that her identity has been discovered, Gyewol changes into women's clothes and sends an appeal to the king, informing him of her true identity as a woman. But even though the king knows that Gyewol is a woman, he still lets her maintain her public position. The king arranges for Gyewol to marry Boguk, but right before their nuptials, Gyewol convenes the army and shows Boguk her skills as a warrior. After they are married, Boguk's concubine, Yeongchun, acts arrogantly and impudently towards Gyewol. Angered by this behavior, Gyewol orders that she be sentenced to death. Through this incident, Gyewol and Boguk's relationship worsens. Soon after, another rebellion breaks out and under the king's orders, Gyewol once more dresses as a man and becomes the commander-in-chief. Under Gyewol's command, Boguk also comes along to suppress the rebellion. In the battlefield, Boguk is surrounded by the rebels and Gyewol saves him again. The rebels secretly enter the capital city and surround the king, but Gyewol courageously saves him. Gyewol again rounds up and defeats the enemy forces. Afterwards, Gyewol maintains her public position and title and lives in peace and harmony with Boguk, giving birth to three sons and one daughter.

== Features and significance ==
Hong Gyewol jeon is a work of female hero fiction that narrates the role of the female protagonist and her importance, boldly and vividly portraying the conflict between a superior woman and an inferior man. By emphasizing the woman's outstanding skill and superiority through a narrative structured around the antagonism between a man and a woman, the novel demonstrates the problems in a reality where women are subordinated within a patriarchal society that has rigid gender roles and prejudices regarding gender. In this manner, the story illuminates the fluidity of the boundaries demarcating gender and gender roles. Moreover, Hong Gyewol jeon shows how a character that is biologically female passes through both male and female gender roles, as shaped by sociocultural demands. The work traces the trajectory of her life as she moves through gender identities according to the situation, ultimately finding a kind of proper harmony between the two genders.

The formulation of this kind of gender duality is shaped through the mutually complementary relations between Hong Gyewol and the male characters that embody the patriarchy. The king, after discovering Hong Gyewol's true identity, still acknowledges her skill and allows her to retain her public position, and even after she is married, helps her demonstrate her “masculine” skills in various situations. Moreover, after Hong Gyewol is married, her father-in-law continues to advocate for her whenever she establishes her superiority over her husband and his son, Boguk. Through the support of such characters that are firmly a part of the patriarchal system, Hong Gyewol changes her original decision in denying a “feminine” life, and comes to materialize a life where both feminine and masculine qualities are combined.

These unique characteristics of Hong Gyewol jeon are often interpreted as the transgression of gender norms and boundaries, causing reviewers to deem it as a work that demonstrates a high degree of female consciousness, especially for its time.

== Other ==
Hong Gyewol jeon is the first work of female hero fiction to be published in textbooks through the revision resulting in the 7th Educational Curriculum (1997-2007). Since then, it has continuously been published in official school textbooks.

== Bibliographic information ==
All versions of Hong Gyewol jeon are written in hangeul, the Korean alphabet, and copies were circulated as handwritten manuscripts or manuscripts printed with movable lead type. There are currently a total of 16 extant copies. They are generally classified into two categories: the version held at the Academy of Korean Studies collection that comprises 45 chapters and contains two war stories [hereafter Academy of Korean Studies Version] and the version held at the Dankook University collection that comprises 103 chapters and contains four war stories [hereafter Dankook University Version]. Both versions have in common that in the first and second tellings of the war stories, the female protagonist demonstrates superior abilities than the male protagonist. However, in contrast to the first and second, the third and fourth war story episodes contain stories that emphasize and strengthen the male protagonists’ agency and role. In this manner, the Academy of Korean Studies Version places a greater importance on the female protagonist in terms of the male-female narrative, while the Dankook University Version increases the importance of the male protagonist and moderates the female protagonist's role and importance.

== See also ==
- Hua Mulan
