= Kyujanggak =

Former Korean royal library

Coordinates: 37°27′44″N 126°57′02″E

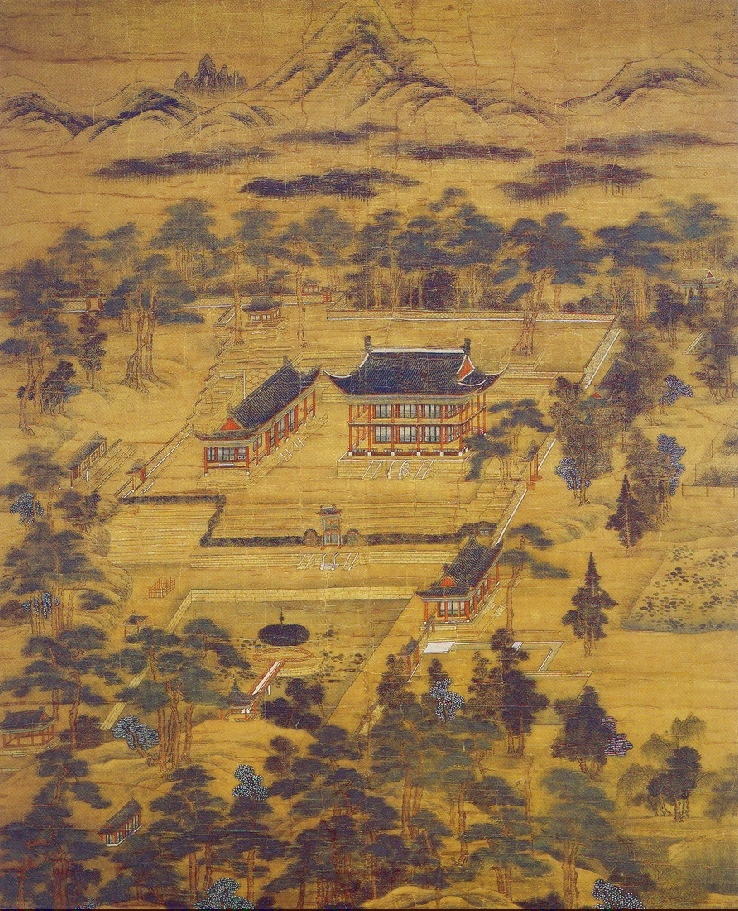

Korean name
- Hangul: 규장각
- Hanja: 奎章閣
- RR: Gyujanggak
- MR: Kyujanggak

Kyujanggak (Korean: 규장각; Hanja: 奎章閣) was the royal library of the Joseon dynasty. It was founded in 1776 by order of King Jeongjo of Joseon (as a major policy arm of his government), at which time it was located on the grounds of Changdeokgung. Today known as Kyujanggak Royal Library, the Kyujanggak Archives are maintained by Kyujanggak Institute for Korean Studies at the Seoul National University, located in Sillim-dong, Gwanak District, Seoul. The archive functions as a key repository of Korean historical records and a centre for research and publication of an annual journal titled Kyujanggak.

== History ==
It is named after imperial calligraphic works stored there, the kyujang (奎章), which literally means "writings of Kyu", a scholar-deity, but has come to refer to divinely inspired writings, in particularly, the emperor's.

In 1782, the Outer Kyujanggak library (known as Oegyujanggak) was built in the ancient royal palace on Ganghwado to accommodate an overflow of books from the main Kyujanggak library at Changdeokgung in Seoul, where the royal viewing copies were kept, and most of the viewing copies were transferred there.

The library's role underwent various changes after the Gabo Reforms of 1894. In 1922, it was moved under the jurisdiction of Keijo Imperial University, which later gave rise to the Seoul National University. The library moved to its present location in 1990 and became independent of the Seoul National University Central Library in 1992.

== Looting and repatriation ==
In 1866, during the French campaign against Korea, the troops attacked Ganghwado and seized a vast amount of silverware, royal artifacts, and 297 volumes of royal Uigwe from the Outer Kyujanggak library and burned down the building. The Korean Government tried to retrieve the royal documents through a permanent lease, since French law prohibits its national assets being transferred abroad. In 2010, a Seoul-based civic group spearheaded the return but the request to exclude illegally obtained property from its list of national assets was rejected by a Paris court. An agreement was made by President Lee Myung-bak and President Nicolas Sarkozy at the 2010 G-20 Seoul summit to return the royal documents on a five-year renewable loan basis. From April to June 2011, 297 volumes with 191 different Uigwes, were shipped back in four separate installments and subsequently kept at the National Museum of Korea.

In 1922, during the Japanese occupation of Korea many volumes of books including 167 of Uigwe, along with some 1,000 other relics, stored at the main Gyujanggak library at Changdeokgung were also taken to Japan. In August 2010, then-Japanese Prime Minister Naoto Kan announced the return of the Uigwe to mark the centenary of the Japanese annexation of Korea. After a 16-month process 1,200 volumes including 150 Uigwe were returned in December 2011, and subsequently kept at the National Palace Museum of Korea.

== Collection ==
The collection has over 260,000 items, with many of them digitized and available online. Notably the Annals of the Joseon Dynasty (aka Joseon Wangjo Sillok), Daily Records of the Royal Secretariat (aka Seungjeongwon Ilgi) and Uigwe or "Royal Protocols" of the Joseon Dynasty, that were not looted and remained in Korea. They are among the National treasures of South Korea and are inscribed in UNESCO's Memory of the World Programme.

In addition, it has royal, government, private documents, such as land transactions and power of attorney and maps on natural geography and the state of society of Joseon Dynasty. The antique maps include a provincial map of 1872, a plotting-paper map stamped by Bibyeonsa, a Joseon map, and an eight-province map. It also has a database of Government records with 110 volumes in ten kinds kept by each provincial and gun office, 99 collections of compiled official documents, foreign diplomacy documents kept by each province, 149 volumes of foreign trade-related materials, 180 volumes of court proceeding records. The materials depicts how the nation took modernization policies and coped with aggressions of Western powers. The court proceeding records, from 1894 to 1910, provide information on life style of people from various walks of life, their way of thinking, and acts of the State. It also includes book titles plates and Naegak illyeok, at 1,249 volumes, a daily record of affairs kept by the Gyujanggak Royal Library from 1779 to 1883. Its contents are not found in other chronological documents covering the same period.

== In media ==
The library was used as a filming location, as part of Seoul National University, for Seoul Broadcasting System's 2008 drama Star's Lover. It was used as the university of Kim Chul Soo's, played by Yoo Ji-tae, employment, his lectures and Lee Ma-ri's, played by Choi Ji-woo, visit to the school. Other locations used included the gallery and museum roads. This is the first time the university has allowed its campus to be used as a filming location.

== See also ==
- History of Korea
- King Jeongjo of Joseon
- Chŏng Yagyong
- Changdeokgung
- Jangseogak
- Seoul National University
  - Kyujanggak Institute for Korean Studies
- Jongno District, Seoul
- Gwanak District, Seoul
