= A History of Korea (Seth book) =

2011 non-fiction book by Michael J. Seth

A History of Korea: From Antiquity to the Present
- Author: Michael J. Seth
- Publisher: Rowman & Littlefield
- Publication date: 2011
- Pages: 573

A History of Korea: From Antiquity to the Present is a non-fiction book by academic Michael J. Seth. It was published in 2011 by Rowman & Littlefield.

== Summary ==
A History of Korea is divided in two halves: the first dealing with Korean pre-history through the 1800s, and the second dealing with Japanese occupation of Korea, the Korean War, and the respective histories of North and South Korea. It takes an overview-style approach, building off of other Korean history books.

== Reception ==
The book was widely praised in comparison to other history books about Korea, especially modern English-language texts, with reviewers pointing to what they felt was a comprehensive description of Korean history that was a good addition to the genre and, possibly, a good addition to undergraduate courses about Korea. Reviewers also appreciated Seth's inclusion, in each chapter, a section describing concurrent global events. However, reviews in the Journal of Korean Studies and Pacific Affairs pointed to what they felt as lack of an overarching narrative or theme, and especially the lack of connections made between pre- and post-1900s history, and a weak point of the book. Anders Karlsson, of Pacific Affairs, elaborated that this was "not so much a critique" of Seth's work, but merely his opinion on a trend that was "reflective of much Western scholarship on Korea". Reviews differed on Seth's treatment on more controversial aspects of Korean history. While he was widely praised for his willingness to accept ambiguity and highlight areas where sources differ, he also chose to avoid his own, personal commentary on these events. The Journal of Asian Studies review found this to be a positive element, and the reviewer praised the way he chose to actively ask the reader to consider their opinions of the events and come to their own conclusions. However, the Journal of Korean Studies review felt that Seth's refusal to give commentary was done to make his book as widely marketable as possible. As evidence of his, he highlighted Seth's lack of commentary on nobi, or people legally classified as property, and the debate within Korea as to whether to label nobi as slaves.

In terms of specific historical events, the Journal of Korean Studies review praised the amount of detail Seth included on the history of North Korea, the prehistory of Korea, and especially the attention he paid to the Four Commanderies of Han, but criticized what the reviewer felt was a lack of attention paid to Korean culture. Conversely, a review in Pacific Affairs felt that Seth's account, while balanced, should have included substantially more detail about the Joseon dynasty, considering its importance to Korean history. The Journal of Asian Studies placed Seth's treatment of history in the context of what the reviewer felt was a wider push to recognise "Korea's uniqueness". He noted Seth's appreciation of the country and how that was reflected in his descriptions.

The Journal of Korean Studies praised Seth's overall reliability, though disagreed with a few translations, transliterations, his description of Yi Pang-wŏn as a "hostage" of the Ming court, when he was in fact on a diplomatic mission, and the fact that Seth erroneously said that army general Chung Ho-yong ordered attacks on protestors after the protestors had burnt down a broadcasting station during the Gwangju Uprising. In reality, the protestors burnt down the broadcasting station after they were attacked.
