= Pak ssi jeon =

19th century Korean historical fiction

Pak ssi jeon (Korean: 박씨전; Hanja: 朴氏傳; lit. The Tale of Lady Pak) is a fictional work that describes the activities of an extraordinary and talented female protagonist, Lady Pak. It also portrays a real historical event, the Second Manchu Invasion of 1636, and is thus classified as a yeoksa gundam soseol (historical war story fiction). Moreover, as the story depicts a female protagonist saving the land from the crisis of war, it can also be considered a work of yeoseong yeongung soseol, female hero fiction. However, unlike other, more general works of female hero fiction, the female protagonist in Pak ssi jeon does not disguise herself as a man and participate in the public sphere. Instead, the fact that the female protagonist, without disguise and fully as a woman, does not venture out from the household but still demonstrates heroic behavior, is a unique characteristic of this work.

== Authorship ==
The author and exact time period of creation is unknown, but the author is presumed to be a man. Moreover, there is a handwritten manuscript of Pak ssi jeon stored at Korea University in Seoul, South Korea, that is the oldest extant version and marks its publication date as 1895 and thus, it is estimated that the work was originally published and created sometime around the 19th century.

== Plot ==
During the reign of King Injo of Joseon, there was a man named Yi Gwi, appointed to an important government position and living in Hanyang, that had a bright and talented son, Yi Sibaek. One day, a man named Pak Cheosa, disguised in shabby dress, comes to find Yi Gwi who immediately sees through his disguise. He arranges for his son, Yi Sibaek, and Pak Cheosa's daughter, Lady Pak, to be married. On the day of their marriage, Yi Gwi and Yi Sibaek go to Geumgang Mountain and find Pak Cheosa to carry out the nuptials. They meet Lady Pak who appears quite uncomely and walks with a limp. Moreover, it seems she only ever eats and sleeps a lot. Yi Gwi's wife, Yi Sibaek, and even the servants constantly mistreat Lady Pak and only Yi Gwi feels sorry for her. Aware of his sympathy, Lady Pak pleads with Yi Gwi to arrange another house for her and together with her maid, Gyehwa, they move to a separate household. From this point on, Lady Pak demonstrates her superb talents, such as creating a full court attire outfit for her father-in-law, Yi Gwi, in a single night through the use of Taoist magic, or buying a weak horse for 300 nyang (unit of currency in the Joseon Dynasty) and then turning it into an excellent steed and selling it to an envoy from Ming China for 30,000 nyang. Moreover, when her husband Yi Sibaek uses the special water dropper for ink that Lady Pak gives him, he ends up placing first in the civil service examination. In addition, she names the house where she lives as pihwadang (避禍堂 Sanctuary from Disaster) and plants all kinds of trees in the area in accordance with the Eastern cosmology principles of Yin and Yang and the Five Elements of the Universe, turning that space into a sacred site.

For the first time in four years, Lady Pak finally visits her in-laws, using special Taoist magic that allows her to traverse long distances in an instant. Later, Pak Cheosa visits Yi Gwi's house and states that Lady Pak's curse has finally been lifted and uses the magical skill of transfiguration so that her shabby appearance falls away. Lady Pak is thus revealed to actually be a beautiful woman and afterwards, the Yi family treats her hospitably and she gets along amicably with her husband.

Shortly afterwards, the Manchu ruler decides to invade Joseon and his queen consort devises a scheme in which she sends her maid, Gi Hongdae, as an assassin. However, Lady Pak, through Taoist magic, discovers this plan preemptively and drives out Gi Hongdae. Afterwards, Han Yu and Yong Uldae, two commanders of the Manchu nation, gather an army of a hundred thousand men and invade Joseon. Lady Pak once more uses magic to discover these plans and informs Yi Sibaek in order to adequately prepare. However, traitors in the Joseon royal court oppose the countermeasure and it fails. In the end, the Manchu army lays siege to Hanyang, the capital of Joseon, and the Joseon King is forced to surrender. At that moment, Yong Uldae's younger brother, Yong Goldae, goes to Lady Pak's residence, pihwadang, where he is stabbed and killed by Lady Pak's maid, Gyehwa. Yong Uldae mobilizes the army in order to get revenge and goes to pihwadang, where he is defeated by Taoist magic at the hands of Lady Pak. However, because the King of Joseon already surrendered, Yong Uldae takes the crown prince of Joseon and others as hostages. Because of this, the Joseon King greatly regrets not listening to Lady Pak's advice, and Lady Pak becomes even more famous throughout the land, enjoying great wealth and honor until the day of her death.

== Features and Significance ==
Because Pak ssi jeon centers around the real historical event of the Second Manchu Invasion of 1636, it is classified as a yeoksa gundam soseol (historical war story fiction). Although the story is clearly fictional, especially with the elements of Lady Pak defeating the characters from the Qing/Manchu with Taoist magic, the fact that the punishment of the Qing characters is done at the hands of a woman can be interpreted as criticizing the powerless, male ruling class of Joseon, as well as a projection of a desire to heal the wounds from the Manchu Invasion, even if only in fictional form.

Along with the aforementioned characteristics, Pak ssi jeon is also significant in that it is a work of female hero fiction. In general, female hero fiction features a female protagonist that rejects the traditional female roles fixed within a patriarchal society and instead disguises herself as a man and to pursues traditionally male roles in the public sphere. Such actions can be interpreted as a woman's desire to seek equality by imitating a man in a society where men and women are clearly differentiated and fixed within a rigid hierarchy of power. Yet in Pak ssi jeon, Lady Pak desires to fulfill the role of an excellent wife, daughter-in-law, lady of the house, and other typically feminine roles. Moreover, Lady Pak does not disguise herself as a man in order to step into spheres of society that are traditionally occupied only by men. When the war breaks out, Lady Pak stays within the interior space of the home, at pihwadang, and from there, protects other women from the outside violence, and repels exterior enemies through her husband or her maid, as well as Taoist magic. Thus, Pak ssi jeon is ultimately seen as a work in which the ways of women overpower the world of men.

== Other ==
Out of all classical Korean novels, Pak ssi jeon is the only text to be included in both middle and high school Korean language textbooks.

== Texts ==
Considering the fact that over 160 copies of Pak ssi jeon exist today, it can be considered a very popular work that received much attention in its time. All extant copies are written in Korean (hangeul, the Korean alphabet), with 130 of them as handwritten versions, and 30 of them printed. As of yet, no banggakbon versions have been discovered—copies of books that were printed privately for commercial purposes. The oldest known copy of Pak ssi jeon is a handwritten manuscript stored within the Korea University collection, under the title of Pak ssi jyeon (박씨젼). At the end of the book, there is a line that states “Eulmi jeongwol deungseo” (乙未 正月 謄書 Transcribed in the First Month of the Eulmi Year) and the “eulmi year” is 1895.
