= Mark A. Peterson =

American Koreanist

Mark A. Peterson is an American Koreanist, professor emeritus at Brigham Young University (BYU), and YouTuber. He operates the channel Frog Outside the Well, which covers Korean history and culture.

Peterson was born in Utah, United States. He is a member of the Church of Jesus Christ of Latter-day Saints. He arrived in South Korea in 1965 as a missionary of the church. He evangelized in Gwangju. He graduated with a bachelor's degree in anthropology from BYU in 1971. He received a master's degree (1971) and doctorate (1987) from Harvard University. His thesis was on the Gwangju Uprising. He opposed the military dictatorship of South Korean leader Chun Doo-hwan. He is a supporter of the American Democratic Party, and has voiced criticisms of American president George W. Bush and the Iraq War. He led the LDS mission in Busan, and was director of the Fulbright Program in South Korea from 1978 to 1983. In 1996, he received the Yeonam Prize for one of his papers.

He has advocated for reform on discussions of the historiography of Korea, and on the teaching of Korean history and the Korean language in both South Korea and abroad. Peterson argues that Korea's history is distinguished by stability, with a relative lack of foreign invasions. He has also analyzed why most people have the same few Korean surnames. In 2021, he publicly debated J. Mark Ramseyer on the issue of whether comfort women were voluntary prostitutes.

He has two ethnic Korean daughters, both of whom he adopted.
