= Korean Studies (journal) =

- Discipline: Korean studies
- Language: English

Publication details
- History: 1977 to present
- Publisher: University of Hawaii Press (USA)
- Frequency: annual

Standard abbreviations
- ISO 4: Korean Stud.

Indexing
- ISSN: 0145-840X (print); 1529-1529 (web)

Links
- Journal homepage

Korean Studies (Korean: 한국학) is an English-language international academic journal that seeks to further scholarship on Korea and Koreans abroad by providing a forum for interdisciplinary and multicultural articles, book reviews, and essays in the humanities and social sciences.

The journal was founded at the University of Hawaii Center for Korean Studies under the directorship of Dae-Sook Suh. Volumes 1–3 list the Center faculty, but no editor. Volumes 4–6 list Peter D. Lee as editor, and subsequent volumes show editorial successions by Center faculty at intervals of (usually) three to six years. The journal continues to be edited at the UH Center for Korean Studies and published by the University of Hawaii Press.

The cover design changed in 1996, on its 20th anniversary. The translation of its title as Hangukhak, which appears in Korean script on the cover, has generated some controversy because only South Koreans call their country Hanguk. North Koreans call theirs Chosŏn (also spelled Joseon).

Korean Studies appears annually. However, volumes 25–26 (2001–2002) contain two issues each. Its first electronic edition appeared in 2000 on Project MUSE.

== See also ==
- Korea Journal
