= Jangseogak =

Korean history and culture archive

- Hangul: 장서각
- Hanja: 藏書閣
- RR: Jangseogak
- MR: Changsŏgak

Janseogak (Korean: 장서각) is a Korean history archive operated by the Academy of Korean Studies near Seoul, South Korea. The collection focuses on works dealing with traditional Korean history and culture, and has its origins in the royal library once held at the palace Changdeokgung. Unique holdings of the collection include its large collection of Uigwe, or "royal protocols" dealing with such various subjects as royal wedding processions and construction techniques, the royal genealogies of the Joseon dynasty, cartographic materials, and traditional Korean novels written in hangeul script.

== See also ==
- Yiwangjik
