= Shimpei Cole Ota =

Japanese anthropologist (born 1975)

Shimpei C. Ota
- 太田 心平
- Born: 1975 (age 50–51); Osaka City, Japan
- Other name: 오타 심페이
- Occupation: associate professor
- Years active: 2000s – present

Academic background
- Education: B.A. Human Sciences (Sociology), Osaka University (1998); M.A. Human Sciences (Anthropology), Osaka University (2000); A.B.D. Anthropology Seoul National University (2003); Ph.D. Human Sciences (Anthropology) Osaka University (2007)
- Alma mater: Osaka University

Academic work
- Discipline: cultural anthropology, cultural history
- Sub-discipline: museum studies
- Institutions: National Museum of Ethnology (Japan), Graduate University for Advanced Studies, National Institutes for the Humanities, American Museum of Natural History

Shimpei Cole Ota (太田 心平; born 1975) is a sociocultural anthropologist, sociocultural historian, researcher of Northeast Asian studies and curator of ethnology. He is an associate professor of cross-field research at the National Museum of Ethnology which is the largest research institute for the humanities in Japan and is one of the six members of the National Institutes for the Humanities, Japan (NIHU). Ota is also working for the Graduate University for Advanced Studies as an associate professor of museum studies, and is affiliated at the American Museum of Natural History as a research associate of anthropology.

== Career ==
Ota was born in Osaka City and earned his BA (1998), MA (2000), then PhD (2007) in human sciences from Osaka University. He also completed an additional doctoral program in anthropology at Seoul National University from 2000 to 2003. Before joining NIHU, he lived in Korea for seven years.

== Research ==
Ota's research examines people's recognition of cultures. More specifically, he tries to explain how people and societies recognize their own cultural "change." What do the narratives and discourses of personal change and social shift epistemologically mean? He has pursued this question mainly through case studies of Korean political history and intellectual subculture. For example, his publications explore South Korean activists' recognition of Korean "democratization," and the cultural history of Korean scholar-bureaucrats from their descendants' point of view during the 17th to 19th centuries. Ota has also been conducting researches on Korean celadon ceramics, on oversea Koreans in Mainland China and United States, and on museum administration.
