= Edward Willett Wagner =

American historian (1924–2001)

- Born: August 7, 1924; Cleveland, Ohio, U.S.
- Died: December 7, 2001 (aged 77); Concord, Massachusetts, U.S.
- Education: Harvard University
- Occupations: Professor and academic
- Spouse: Namhi Kim Wagner (m. 1968)
- Military career
- Allegiance: United States
- Branch: United States Army
- Conflicts: World War II

Edward Willett Wagner (August 7, 1924 – December 7, 2001) was an American academic and a professor of Korean studies at Harvard University; he was an expert on Korean aristocracy during the Joseon period.

== Biography ==
Wagner was born in Cleveland, Ohio to Theodore and Gertrude Wagner; Wagner had an older brother Ted, a twin brother Walter, a younger brother John, and a younger sister Rachel.

Wagner graduated in 1941 at the age of 16 from Canton McKinley High School in Canton, Ohio. He enrolled at Harvard University on scholarship that fall. His undergraduate career was interrupted by World War II. Wagner briefly served in the U.S. Army during the war. His interest in Korean studies arose while working as a civilian in Korea as part of the United States Army Military Government in Korea between 1945 and 1948. After resuming his undergraduate work at Harvard in 1948, he received his bachelor's degree and master's degree from Harvard and his PhD from there in 1959.

After earning his PhD from Harvard in 1959, Wagner then joined Harvard's faculty, from which he retired in 1993. He founded the Korea Institute at Harvard University in 1981 and served as its director until 1993.

Wagner lived in Lexington, Massachusetts, and was married to Leonore Uhlmann from 1948 to 1966, when the couple divorced. In 1968 he married Namhi Kim, who was his wife at the time of his death. Wagner died on December 7, 2001, at Concord, Massachusetts, from Alzheimer's disease.

Due to his influence in the field, Wagner is often referred to as the "Father of [American] Korean Studies".

== Works ==
- The Korean Minority in Japan, 1904-1950 (1951)
- The Literati Purges: Political Conflict in Early Yi Korea (1974–1975)
- A New History of Korea (English translation)
