= Academy of Korean Studies =

South Korean academic institute

The Academy of Korean Studies
- 한국학중앙연구원 (韓國學中央硏究院)
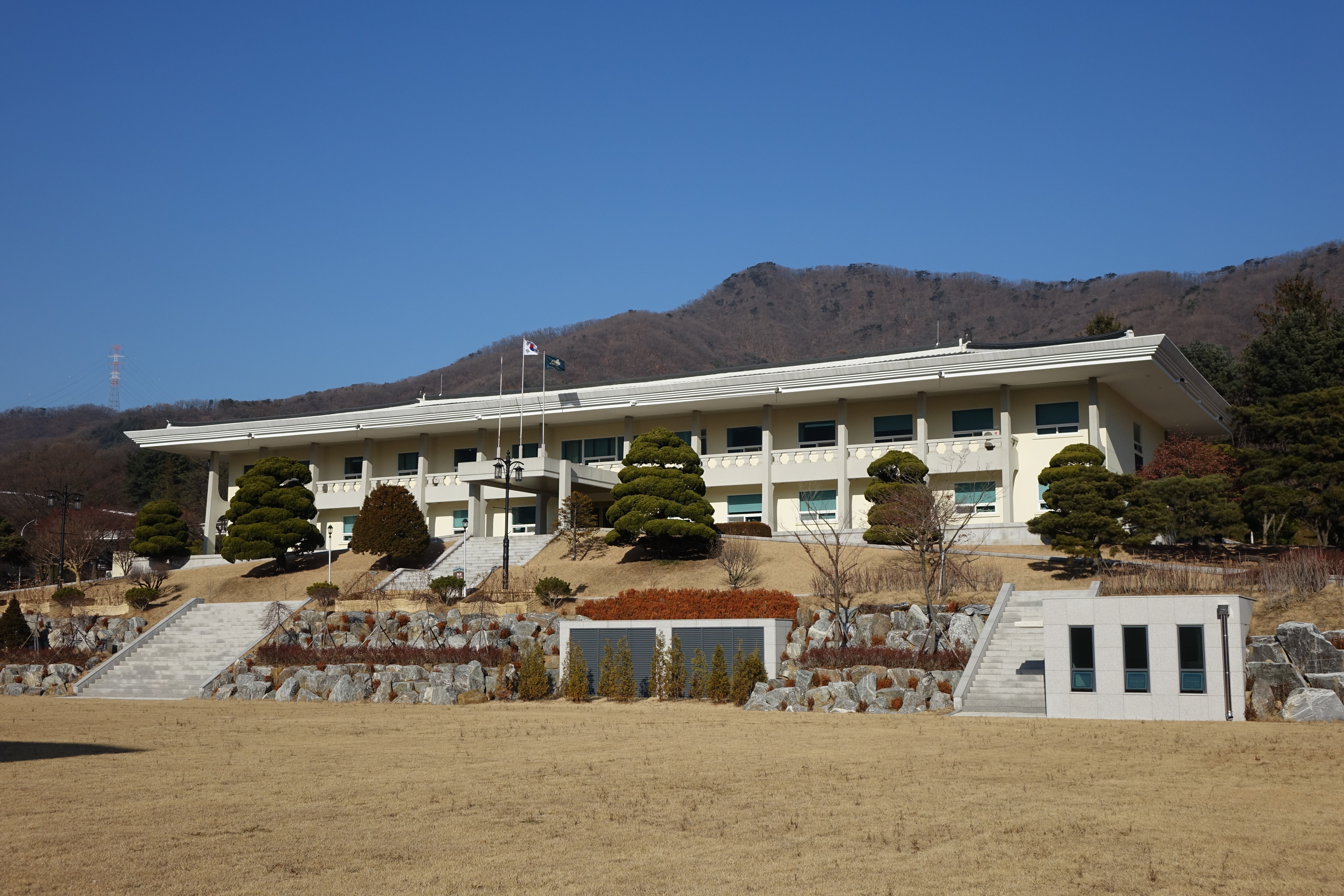
- Other name: AKS
- Former name: 한국정신문화연구원 (韓國精神文化硏究院)
- Type: National
- Established: June 30, 1978
- Affiliations: Jangseogak (장서각 藏書閣)
- Officer in charge: Ministry of Education, Science and Technology
- President: Ahn, Byung-Ook
- Location: 50 Unjung-dong, Bundang, Seongnam, Gyeonggi Province, South Korea; 37.390739°N 127.059031°E
- Website: intl.aks.ac.kr

- Academy of Korean Studies
- Hangul: 한국학중앙연구원
- Hanja: 韓國學中央硏究院
- Lit.: Korean Studies Central Research Institute
- RR: Hangukhak jungang yeonguwon
- MR: Han'gukhak chungang yŏn'guwŏn

The Academy of Korean Studies (AKS; Korean: 한국학중앙연구원) is a South Korean research and educational institute focusing on Korean studies. It was established on June 22, 1978, by the Ministry of Education & Science Technology.

== Works ==
Journals

- Korea Journal
- Review of Korean Studies
- Korean Studies Quarterly

The following journals are not published by the AKS, but are often incorrectly assumed to be:

- Korean Studies, Hawaii
- The Journal of Korean Studies, Seattle
- Encyclopedia of Korean Culture
- Acta Koreana

== See also ==
- List of national universities in South Korea
- List of universities and colleges in South Korea
- Education in Korea
