= National Palace Museum of Korea =

Royal history museum in Seoul, South Korea

Coordinates: 37°34′36″N 126°58′31″E

National Palace Museum of Korea 국립고궁박물관

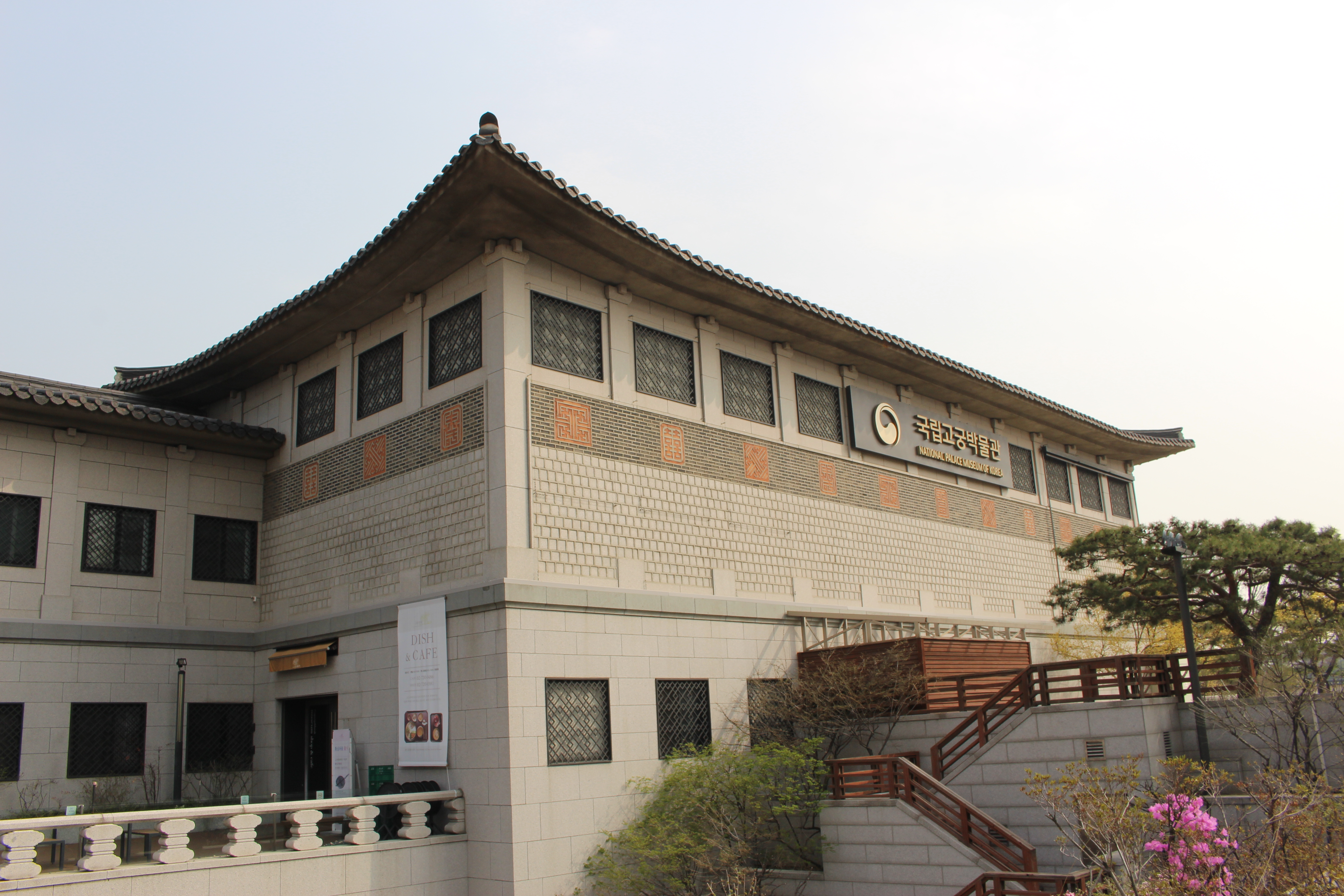
- Established: September 1908
- Location: Sajikno 34 (Sejongno), Jongno-gu, Seoul, South Korea
- Visitors: 1,513,000 (2016)
- Director: Soh Jae-gu
- Website: gogung.go.kr

Korean name
- Hangul: 국립고궁박물관
- Hanja: 國立古宮博物館
- RR: Gungnip gogung bangmulgwan
- MR: Kungnip kogung pangmulgwan

The National Palace Museum of Korea (Korean: 국립고궁박물관) is a national museum located in Gyeongbokgung, Seoul, South Korea.

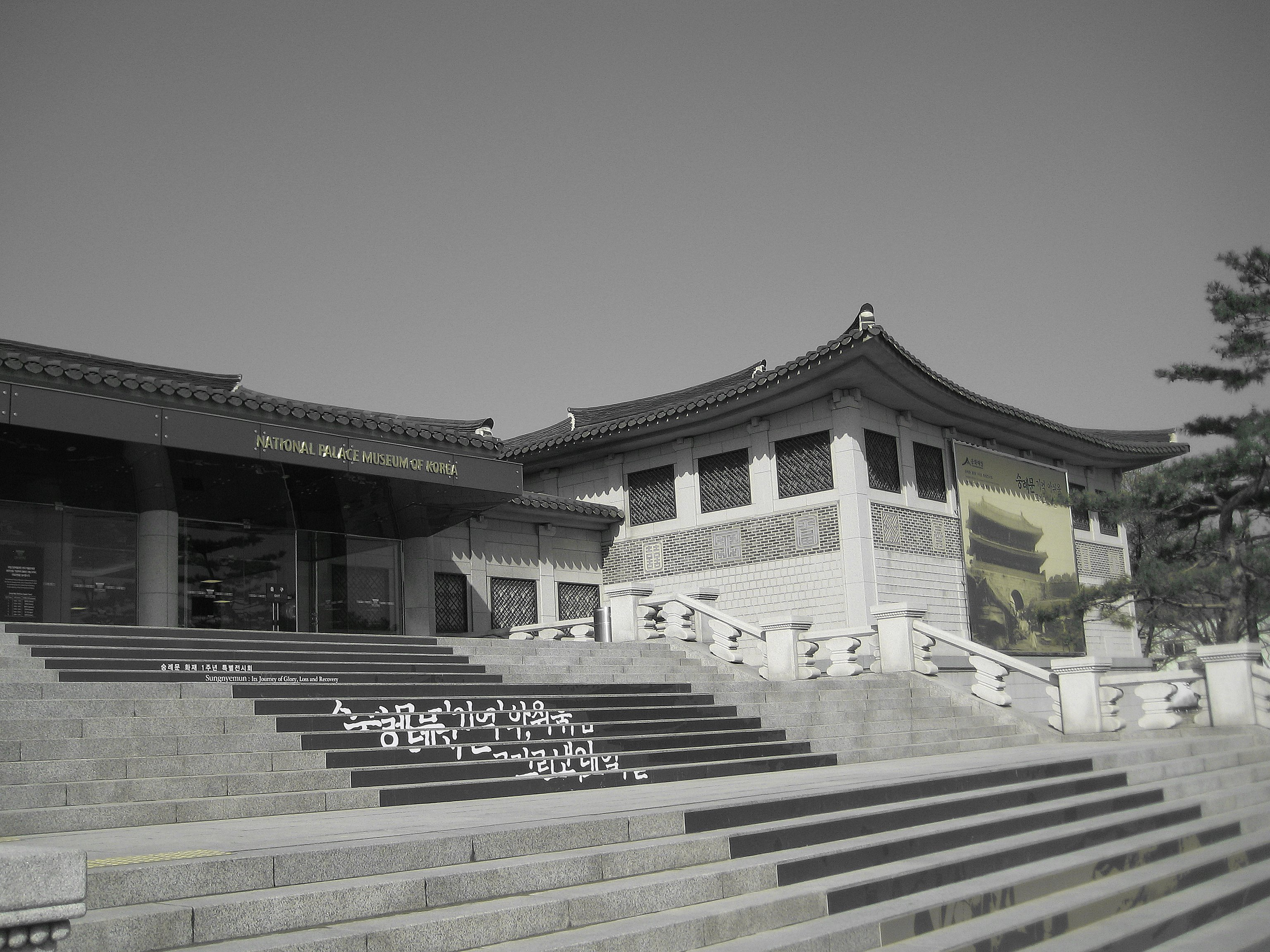
February 2009

== History ==
The museum first began as the "Korean Imperial Museum", which was established in September 1908 and was originally located in Changgyeonggung. On November of the following year, the museum was opened to the public. However, in April 1938, the ruling Japanese government renamed the museum to the "Museum of Yi dynasty".

In March 1946, after the liberation of Korea, it was renamed "Deoksugung Museum". In 1991, Cultural Heritage Administration instituted the museum in Seokjojeon (석조전, Stone Hall) of Deoksugung Palace, and in 2005, the museum was relocated to a modern building inside Gyeongbokgung.

== Collection ==
National Palace Museum of Korea houses over 40,000 artifacts and royal treasures, from the palaces of the Joseon period and the Korean Empire, of which 14 are National Treasures of South Korea. It displays records, state rites, architecture, clothing, royal life, education, culture, paintings and music of the dynasty's ruling era. It also has among its collection the royal seal of King Gojong of Joseon, which was used for his personal letters to Russian czar and Italian emperor after 1903. It disappeared during Japanese rule and was re-covered from a US-based Korean collector in 2009.

In March 2021, in conjunction with the Korea Cultural Heritage Foundation, the National Palace Museum opened an installation at the arrivals hall of Terminal 1 at Incheon Airport. The installation features eight pieces of media art including one transparent LED display, three media walls and four kinetic artworks. The artworks display traditional Korean themes and cultural elements.

=== Permanent exhibitions ===
- Royal Symbols and Records
- State Rites
- Joseon Science
- Palace Architecture
- Royal Life
- Royal Childbirth and Education
- Royal Scholarly Culture
- Korean Empire
- Royal Court Paintings
- Royal Court Music
- Royal Palanquins
- Joseon Water Clock

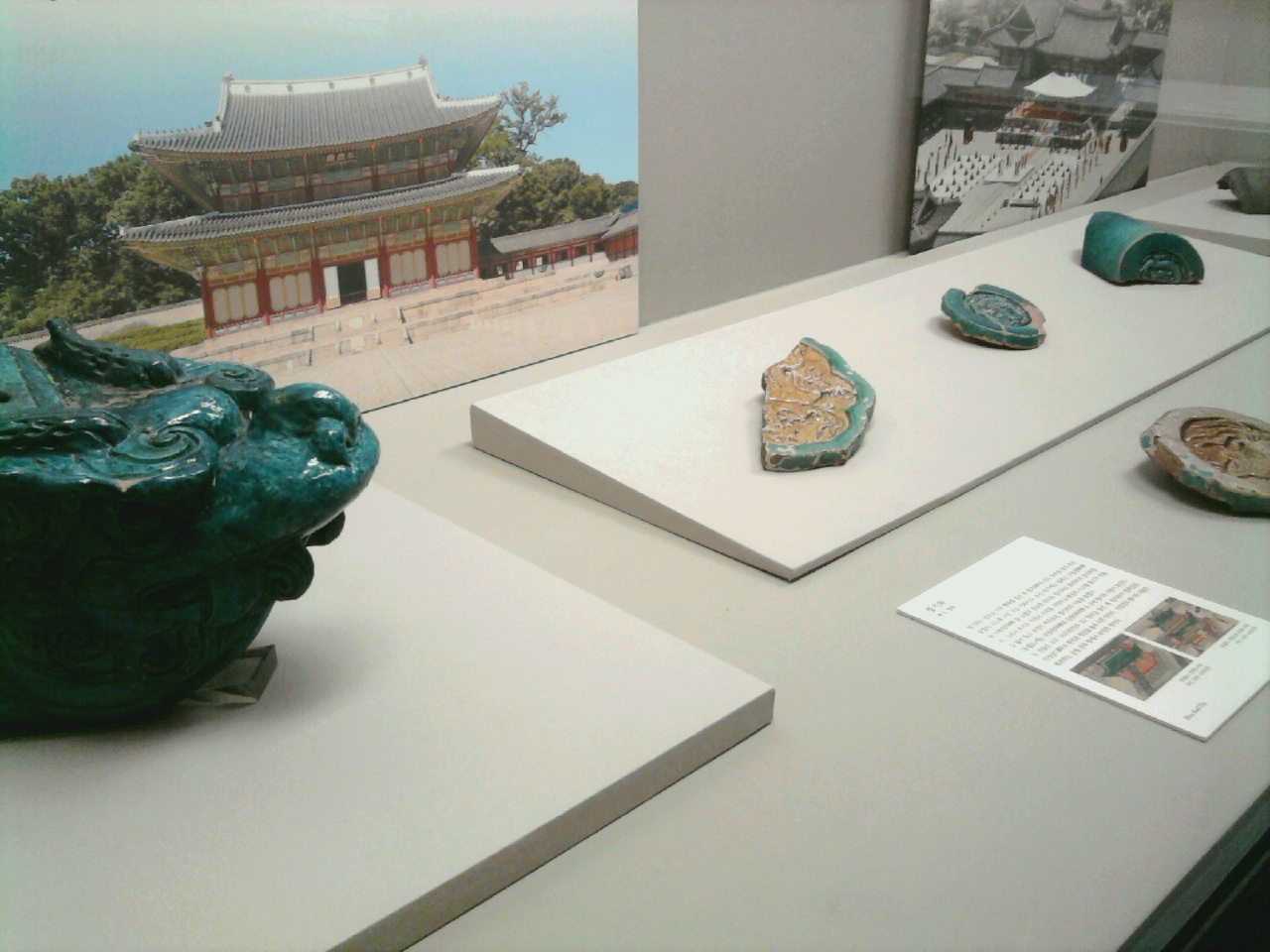
Blue roof tile exhibit

=== Special collection ===
The Museum houses 1,200 volumes of historical texts including 150 copies of Uigwe from the Joseon period that were looted in 1922, during rule by Japan under the supervision of then Resident-General of Korea Itō Hirobumi. They were repatriated in December 2011 and a special exhibition was held from 27 December 2011 to 5 February 2012. The copies chronicled the royal rituals of King Gojong and King Sunjong, the last two emperors of Joseon Dynasty and Daehan Empire before Korea was annexed in 1910.

== See also ==
- List of museums in Seoul
- Gyeongbokgung
