= A History of Korea (Hatada book) =

1951 non-fiction book by Takashi Hatada

- Title page for A History of Korea (1969 edition)
- Author: Takashi Hatada
- Language: Japanese
- Publisher: Iwanami Shoten, ABC-Clio
- Publication date: 1951
- English publication date: 1969

A History of Korea, published originally as Chōsen-shi (Japanese: 朝鮮史), is a non-fiction book by Japanese scholar Takashi Hatada. It was originally published in 1951 by Iwanami Shoten. An English translation by Warren W. Smith Jr. and Benjamin Hazard was published in 1969 by ABC-Clio.

== General references ==
- Bockman, Robert H. (1970). "Review of A History of Korea., Warren W. Smith, Jr". Monumenta Nipponica. 25 (3/4): 476–479. doi:10.2307/2383554. ISSN 0027-0741. JSTOR 2383554.
- Elrod, J. M.; Smith, Warren W. (1971). "Review of A History of Korea, Warren W. Smith, Jr". Pacific Affairs. 44 (1): 120–121. doi:10.2307/2755843. ISSN 0030-851X. JSTOR 2755843.
- Henthorn, William E. (1970-11-01). "Korean History". Journal of Asian Studies. 30 (1): 150–155. doi:10.2307/2942732. ISSN 0021-9118. JSTOR 2942732.
- Rybicki, Steve (1970). "Review of A History of Korea". RQ. 10 (2): 176–177. ISSN 0033-7072. JSTOR 25824130.
- Smith, Warren W.; Hazard, Benjamin H. (February 1954). "History of Korea". The Far Eastern Quarterly. 13 (2): 219. doi:10.2307/2942080. JSTOR 2942080.
- "Review of A History of Korea, Warren W. Smith Jr". Studia Diplomatica (in French). 30 (3): 301. 1977. ISSN 0770-2965. JSTOR 44833480.
