= A History of Korea (Henthorn book) =

1971 non-fiction book by William E. Henthorn

- Author: William E. Henthorn
- Publisher: The Free Press
- Publication date: 1971

A History of Korea is a non-fiction book by William E. Henthorn. It was published in 1971 by The Free Press.

== General references ==
- Deuchler, Martina (1973). "Review of A History of Korea". Bulletin of the School of Oriental and African Studies, University of London. 36 (2): 501. ISSN 0041-977X. JSTOR 613553.
- Haguenauer (1973). "Review of A History of Korea". T'oung Pao. 59 (1/5): 338–339. ISSN 0082-5433. JSTOR 4527982.
- Hazard, Benjamin H. (1972). "New Literature on the History of Korea". The Journal of Asian Studies. 31 (4): 905–910. doi:10.2307/2052109. ISSN 0021-9118. JSTOR 2052109.
- Nish, Ian (1977). "Review of A HISTORY OF KOREA". History. 62 (205): 294. ISSN 0018-2648. JSTOR 24411286.
- Oh, John K. C. (1975). "Review of The History of Korea; A History of Korea". The American Historical Review. 80 (1): 169–170. doi:10.2307/1859185. ISSN 0002-8762. JSTOR 1859185.
