= A History of Korea (Tennant book) =

1996 non-fiction book by Roger Tennant

- Author: Roger Tennant
- Publisher: Keagan Paul International
- Publication date: 1996
- Pages: 318

A History of Korea is a non-fiction book by Roger Tennant. It was published in 1996 by Keagan Paul International.

== General references ==
- Gunn, Geoffrey C. (Jan 1, 1999). "A History of Korea (Book Review)". Journal of Contemporary Asia. 29 (4).
- Howard, Keith (1998). "Review of A History of Korea". Journal of the Royal Asiatic Society. 8 (1): 147–149. ISSN 1356-1863.
