= The History of Korea (Han book) =

Non-fiction book by Woo-keun Han

- Author: Woo-keun Han
- Translator: Lee Kyung-shik
- Language: Korean
- Publisher: Eul-Yoo Publishing Co., East-West Center Press
- English publication date: 1970

The History of Korea is a non-fiction book by Woo-keun Han. An English version, translated by Lee Kyung-shik, was published in 1970 by Eul-Yoo Publishing Co. and in 1971 by East-West Center Press.

== General references ==
- Cook, Harold F. (May 1971). "The History of Korea. By Woo-keun Han. Translated by Lee Kyung-shik and edited by Grafton K. Mintz. Seoul: Eul-Yoo Publishing Co., 1970. xii, 548 pp. Appendices, Bibliography, Maps, Illustrations, Index. $11.00". The Journal of Asian Studies. 30 (3): 689–691. doi:10.2307/2052502. ISSN 0021-9118. JSTOR 2052502.
- Oh, John K. C. (February 1975). "Han Woo-Keun. The History of Korea. Translated by Lee Kyung-Shik. Edited by Grafton K. Mintz. Honolulu: East-West Center Press. 1970. Pp. xii, 551. $15.00 and William E. Henthorn. A History of Korea. New York: Free Press. 1971. Pp. xiv, 256. $7.95". The American Historical Review. doi:10.1086/ahr/80.1.169. ISSN 1937-5239.
