= Acta Koreana =

- Discipline: Korean studies
- Language: English
- Edited by: Tschung-Sun Kim

Publication details
- History: 1998–present
- Publisher: Academia Koreana, Keimyung University (Korea)
- Frequency: Biannually

Standard abbreviations
- ISO 4: Acta Koreana

Indexing
- ISSN: 1520-7412
- LCCN: 99110939
- OCLC no.: 834987973

Links
- Journal homepage

Acta Koreana is a biannual peer-reviewed academic journal covering Korean studies published in English by Academia Koreana (Keimyung University, Daegu, SK). It was established in 1998 as an annual publication; since 2002 it has been published biannually.

== Abstracting and indexing ==
The journal is abstracted and indexed in the Arts & Humanities Citation Index, Current Contents/Arts & Humanities, Scopus, CSA Sociological Abstracts, Bibliography of Asian Studies, Korea Citation Index, and SocINDEX.
