= John Lie (professor) =

American sociologist

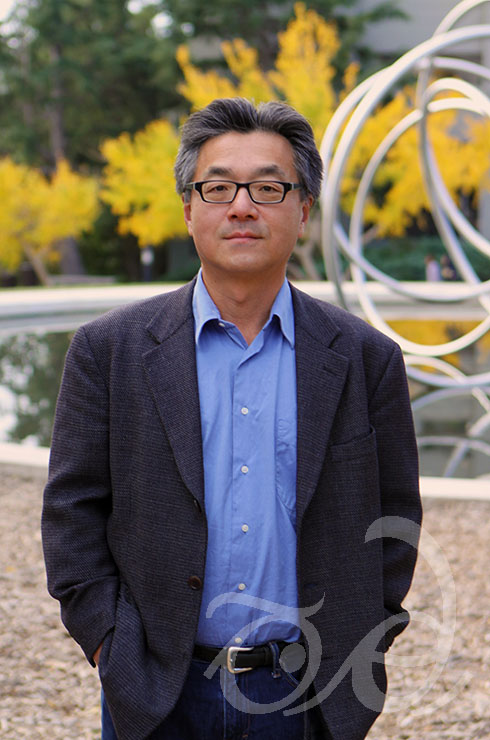
© JohnSheaO'Donnell Photography

John Lie (/liː/ LEE) is professor of sociology at the University of California, Berkeley. His principal academic interests are social theory, political economy, social identity, and East Asia.

== Early life and education ==
Lie was born in Seoul, South Korea. He grew up in Tokyo, Japan, and Honolulu, Hawaii. After graduating from Punahou School, he attended Harvard University (A.B., Social Studies; Ph.D., Sociology). He has held tenured appointments at the University of Illinois, Urbana-Champaign and the University of Michigan, as well as holding visiting appointments at Yonsei University, Keio University, Harvard University, and other institutions.

== Career ==
Lie's "sociological imagination" trilogy explores the intersection of biography, history, and social structure by analyzing his Korean diasporic experience. The trilogy comprises Blue Dreams: Korean Americans and the Los Angeles Riots, Han Unbound: The Political Economy of South Korea, and Multiethnic Japan. The latest addition is "Zainichi (Koreans in Japan): Diasporic Nationalism and Postcolonial Identity".

His book titled Modern Peoplehood. sought to advance a unified theory to make sense of race, nation, ethnicity, racism, and (peoplehood) identity. To advance a general theory of race, ethnicity, and nation that avoids ethnocentrism and essentialism, he proposed a theory of "modern peoplehood".

Lie was Dean of International and Area Studies at Berkeley for five years.

In the 2010s, Lie has continued to publish books on a variety of topics, including K-pop, East Asian political economy, and Japan and the idea of sustainable society.

== Bibliography ==
- Abelmann, Nancy; Lie, John (1995). Blue Dreams: Korean Americans and the Los Angeles Riots. Harvard University Press. ISBN 978-0674077058.
- Lie, John (1998). Han Unbound: The Political Economy of South Korea. Stanford University Press. ISBN 978-0804740159. Archived from the original on 2014-07-01.
- Lie, John (2001). Multiethnic Japan. Harvard University Press. ISBN 978-0674013582.
- Lie, John (2004). Modern Peoplehood. Harvard University Press. ISBN 978-0674013278.
- Lie, John (2008). Zainichi (Koreans in Japan): Diasporic Nationalism and Postcolonial Identity. University of California Press. Archived from the original on 2009-01-22.
- Lie, John (2015). K-pop: Popular Music, Cultural Amnesia, and Economic Innovation in South Korea. University of California Press. ISBN 978-0520283121.
- Lie, John (2018). The Dream of East Asia:The Rise of China, Nationalism, Popular Memory, and Regional Dynamics in Northeast Asia. Association for Asian Studies. ISBN 978-0-924304-87-3.
- Lie, John (2021). Japan, the Sustainable Society: The Artisanal Ethos, Ordinary Virtues, and Everyday Life in the Age of Limits. University of California Press. ISBN 978-0520383524.
