= The Journal of Korean Studies =

- Discipline: Korean studies
- Language: English
- Edited by: Jisoo Kim

Publication details
- History: 1969–1971, 1979–1992, 2004–present
- Publisher: Duke University Press
- Frequency: Biannually

Standard abbreviations
- ISO 4: J. Korean Stud.

Indexing
- ISSN: 0731-1613
- OCLC no.: 5735985

Links
- Journal homepage

The Journal of Korean Studies is a biannual peer-reviewed academic journal covering Korean studies. It was established in 1969. The original series had two issues numbered Volume 1 (1969) and 2 (1971) that were edited by David Messler (University of Washington-Seattle). A decade later, James Palais (University of Washington-Seattle) edited and published volumes 1–5 of the second series (1979–1987). Volumes 6–8 (1988–1992) were edited by Mike Robinson (Indiana University Bloomington).

In 2004, the Korean Studies Program of the Walter H. Shorenstein Asia–Pacific Research Center (Stanford University) and editors Gi-wook Shin and John Duncan revived the journal and published volumes 9–13. In August 2008, Clark W. Sorensen (University of Washington-Seattle) became editor-in-chief. In 2011, The Journal of Korean Studies became a biannual publication. The spring issue is a regular, varied-topic issue, whereas the fall issue is a thematic issue devoted to one topic. In addition to scholarly articles, the journal publishes reviews of the latest Korea-related books.

In July 2016, the journal moved from the University of Washington to the Center for Korean Studies in the Weatherhead East Asian Institute, Columbia University. Theodore Hughes was Editor-in-Chief. In January 2020, the journal moved to GW Institute for Korean Studies at George Washington University, with Jisoo Kim elected as editor-in-chief.

The journal is published by Duke University Press and is also available digitally through Project MUSE. It is abstracted and indexed in the Social Sciences Citation Index, Sociological Abstracts, Social Services Abstracts, Worldwide Political Science Abstracts, PAIS International, Linguistics and Language Behavior Abstracts, Bibliography of Asian Studies, Historical Abstracts, and America: History and Life.
