= MIT Center for International Studies =

Research center at the Massachusetts Institute of Technology

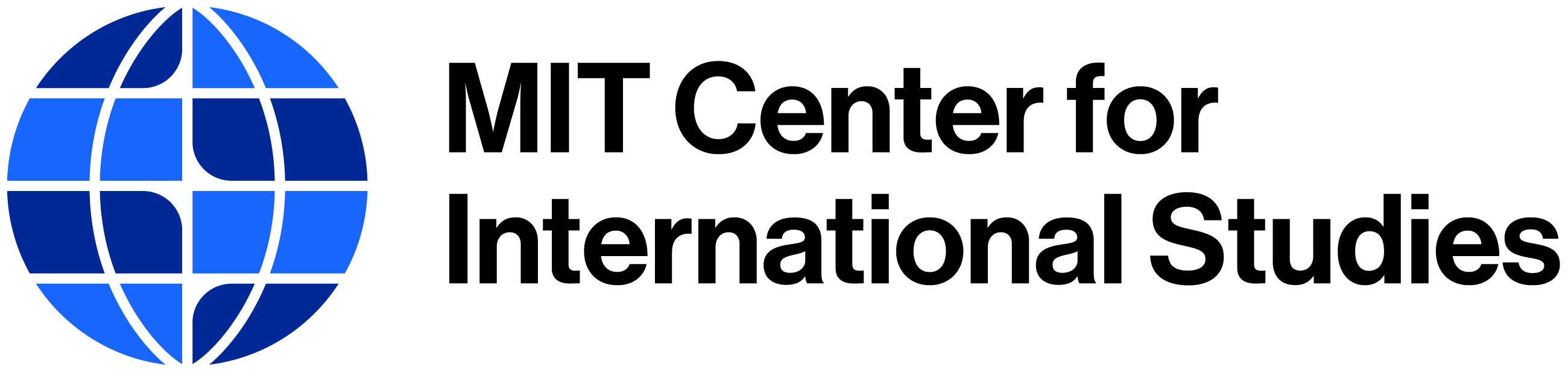
- MIT CIS logo
- Established: 1951
- Director: Evan S. Lieberman
- Location: Cambridge, Massachusetts, United States
- Website: https://cis.mit.edu

The MIT Center for International Studies (CIS) is an academic research center at the Massachusetts Institute of Technology. It sponsors work focusing on international relations, security studies, international migration, human rights and justice, political economy and technology policy. The center was founded in 1951.

According to its website, CIS aims "to support and promote international research and education at MIT".

== History ==
The MIT Center for International Studies was one of several academic research centers founded in the United States after World War II. Its creation was originally funded by the Central Intelligence Agency (CIA), in order to provide expert analysis on issues pertaining to the Cold War rivalry with the Soviet Union.

Prominent social scientists involved with CIS include Lucian Pye, Eugene Skolnikoff, William Kaufmann, Walt Rostow, Ithiel de Sola Pool, and Carl Kaysen. Early on, the center specialized in political and economic development, military strategy, and Asia, and many of its faculty, such as Rostow and Kaysen, served in high government posts. Additionally, Daniel Ellsberg was a research fellow at CIS when he released the Pentagon Papers in 1971.

== Programs ==
The Security Studies Program (SSP), a joint program with the department of political science, was established in the 1970s. Many prominent security specialists in government, think tanks, the military, and academia, including Geoffrey Kemp, Daniel Byman, Ken Pollack, and William Durch, undertook their doctoral studies in SSP. Since the early 1990s, led by such theorists as Barry Posen and Stephen Van Evera, it has been associated with the Neorealist school of international relations.

The MIT International Science and Technology Initiative (MISTI) is a novel program in applied international studies and is considered the hub for global experience at MIT. MISTI was established more than 40 years ago and works across the Institute to enable immersive, impactful, earning experiences, and research opportunities for students and faculty. It currently provides global experiences for more than 1200 undergraduate students per year across. 50% of MIT undergraduate students have participated in MISTI at some point during their MIT experience, and many of these students have participated in MISTI multiple times.

In 2015, the MIT Center for International Studies established the MIT International Policy Lab (IPL), whose mission is “to enhance the impact of MIT research on public policy, in order to best serve the nation and the world in the 21st century.” The Policy Lab awards up to $10,000 to faculty and research staff with principal investigator status who wish to convey their research to policymakers.

In addition, the center organizes Seminar XXI, a yearly educational program for senior military officers, government and NGO officials, and other leaders in U.S. national security policy.

The center also has programs in international political economy, particularly the MIT Program on Emerging Technologies (PoET), a National Science Foundation awardee.

Other programs include:

- Bustani Middle East Seminar
- International Migration and Humanitarian Studies
- Persian Gulf Initiative

Several visiting fellows and scholars join the center each year, including outstanding women journalists under the Elizabeth Neuffer Fellowship, and distinguished public servants under the Robert E. Wilhelm Fellowship. Other individuals have spent weeks or months at the center, such as Ranil Wickremasinghe, former prime minister of Sri Lanka; David Miliband, former foreign secretary of the U.K.; and Fatemeh Haghighatjoo, a former reform member of the Majlis of Iran.

== Leadership and faculty ==
CIS includes 160 members of the MIT faculty and staff, mainly drawn from the departments of political science and urban studies, as well as visiting scholars from around the world.

Administration:

- Evan S. Lieberman, director and Total Professor of Political Science and Contemporary Africa.

Partial list of faculty and scholars:

- Richard J. Samuels, Ford International Professor of Political Science, former director of CIS (2003-2023).
- Barry Posen, Ford International Professor of Political Science and director emeritus of the Securities Studies Program.
- John Tirman, executive director and principal research scientist (2004-2022). Tirman died in 2022.
- Stephen Van Evera, professor emeritus of political science.
- Kenneth A. Oye, associate professor of political science and engineering systems design; former director of CIS; director of MIT Program on Emerging Technologies.
- Elizabeth Wood, professor of history.
- Mai Hassan, associate professor of political science.
- Mariya Grinberg, assistant professor of political science.
- Taylor Fravel, professor of political science, director of the Securities Studies Program.
- Vipin Narang, professor of political science.
- Erik Lin-Greenberg, assistant professor of political science.
- Fotini Christia, professor of political science.
- Owen Cote, senior research scientist.
- Jim Walsh, research scientist.
- Joel Brenner, senior research fellow.

== Wilhelm Fellows ==
- Naomi Chazan, 2004, former Deputy Speaker of the Knesset, Israel
- Francis Deng, 2005, Under Secretary General of the United Nations, former Foreign Minister, Sudan
- Barbara Bodine, 2006, former U.S. Ambassador to Yemen
- William J. Fallon, 2008, former admiral, U.S. Navy, commander of Pacific Command and Central Command
- Hans Georg Eichler, M.D., 2010, senior medical officer at the European Medicines Agency, London
- Abbas Maleki, 2011, former Deputy Foreign Minister, Iran
- Yukio Okamoto, 2013, adviser to the government of Japan
- Joel Brenner, 2014, former inspector general, National Security Agency
- Shivshankar Menon, February 2014, national security advisor for India
- Paul Heer, 2015, national intelligence officer for East Asia
- Mona Makram-Ebeid, October–November 2016, senator in Egypt
- Lourdes Melgar, 2016, deputy secretary of energy for hydrocarbons and under-secretary for electricity for Mexico
- James E. Baker, 2017, chief judge of the US Court of Appeals for the armed forces and special assistant to the president and legal adviser to the National Security Council
- Scott H. Swift, 2018, US navy admiral, commander of the Seventh Fleet and later commander of the US Pacific Fleet
- Hala Al-Dosari, 2019, Saudi women's rights activist
- Steven Simon, 2021, senior director for the Middle East and North Africa during the Obama administration and the NSC senior director for counterterrorism in the Clinton White House

== Neuffer Fellows ==
- Jackee Budesta Batanda, 2011–2012, reporter for the Global Press Institute, Uganda
- Priyanka Borpujari, 2012–2013, independent journalist based in Mumbai, India
- Prodita Sabarini, 2013–2014, reporter from the English daily,The Jakarta Post, Indonesia
- Louisa Reynolds, 2014–2015, independent journalist based in Guatemala City, Guatemala
- Meera Srinivasan, 2015–2016, senior assistant editor with The Hindu
- Jacey Fortin, 2016-2017, American freelance journalist currently based in Addis Ababa, Ethiopia
- Audrey Jiajia Li, 2017-2018, freelance columnist and independent filmmaker, China
- Una Hajdari, 2018-2018, freelance print and TV journalist from Prishtina, Kosovo
- Shola Lawal, 2019-2020, independent filmmaker and freelance West African correspondent, Nigeria
- Ada Petriczko, 2021-2022, freelance journalist and foreign correspondent, Poland
- Maham Javaid, 2022, journalist, Pakistan
- Gabriela Sá Pessoa, 2022-2023, journalist, Brazil
