= Carol Gluck =

American academic and historian

- Occupation: Historian

Academic background
- Education: Wellesley College (BA); Columbia University (PhD)

Academic work
- Discipline: History
- Sub-discipline: History of Japan
- Institutions: Columbia University
- Doctoral students: Jordan Sand, Louise Young
- Notable works: Japan's Modern Myths: Ideology in the Late Meiji Period (1985)

Carol Gluck (born November 12, 1941) is an American academic and historian of Japan. She is the George Sansom Professor Emerita of History at Columbia University and served as the president of the Association for Asian Studies in 1996.

== Career ==
Gluck was born in Chicago, Illinois, and received her B.A. from Wellesley in 1962. She was awarded her Ph.D. from Columbia in 1977.

She has been a visiting professor at the University of Tokyo, the University of Venice, Harvard University, and the École des hautes études en sciences sociales in Paris. For many years, Gluck directed the East Asian Studies program within the Weatherhead East Asian Institute at Columbia. She was president of the Association for Asian Studies in 1996.

== Select works ==
=== Books ===
- 2019 – Sensō no kioku (War Memory). Tokyo: Kōdansha.
- 2007 – Rekishi de kangaeru (Thinking with History). Tokyo: Iwanami.
- 1985 (republished in 2021) – Japan's Modern Myths: Ideology in the Late Meiji Period. Princeton: Princeton University Press.

=== Edited books ===
- 2009 – Words in Motion. Co-edited with Anna Tsing. Durham, North Carolina: Duke University Press.
- 1997 – Asia in Western and World History: A Guide for Teaching. Co-edited with Ainslie Embree. Armonk, New York: M. E. Sharpe.
- 1992 – Showa: the Japan of Hirohito. Co-edited with Stephen Graubard. New York: W. W. Norton & Company.

=== Articles ===
- "Meiji and Modernity: From History to Theory,” in Intrecci Culturali, ed. Rosa Caroli (Venice, 2009).
- "Ten Top Things to Know About Japan in the Early Twentieth Century," Education About Asia (Winter 2008).

== Affiliations ==
- American Academy of Arts and Sciences
- American Philosophical Society

== Honors ==
- 2024 - Distinguished Annual Lecturer, Modern Japan History Association
- 2006 – Order of the Rising Sun, Gold Rays with Neck Ribbon
- 2002 – Japan-United States Fulbright Program 50th Anniversary Distinguished Scholar Award
- 1989 – Great Teacher Awards by Columbia Society of Graduates
