= Japan at Nature's Edge =

2013 non-fiction essay anthology

Japan at Nature's Edge: The Environmental Context of a Global Power
- Publisher: University of Hawai'i Press
- Publication date: 2013

Japan at Nature's Edge: The Environmental Context of a Global Power is an anthology of non-fiction essays relating to the relationship between human society and nature in Japan. Published in 2013 by the University of Hawaiʻi Press, it was edited by Ian Jared Miller, Julia Adeney Thomas, and Brett L. Walker. The essays were written by Daniel P. Aldrich, Jakobina Arch, Andrew Bernstein, Philip C. Brown, Timothy S. George, Jeffrey E. Hanes, David L. Howell, Federico Marcon, Christine L. Marran, Ian Jared Miller, Micah Muscolino, Ken’ichi Miyamoto, Sara B. Pritchard, Julia Adeney Thomas, Karen Thornber, William M. Tsutsui, Brett L. Walker, and Takehiro Watanabe.

== General references ==
- Smits, Gregory (February 2015). "Japan at Nature's Edge: The Environmental Context of a Global Power. Edited by Ian Jared Miller, Julia Adeney Thomas, and Brett L. Walker. Honolulu: University of Hawai'i Press. xiv, 322 pp. $65.00 (cloth); $35.00 (paper)". The Journal of Asian Studies. 74 (1): 220–221. doi:10.1017/S0021911814002009. ISSN 0021-9118.
- Stolz, Robert (2016). "Review of Japan at Nature's Edge: The Environmental Context of a Global Power". Environmental History. 21 (2): 411–412. ISSN 1084-5453. JSTOR 24691610.
