= Andre Schmid (academic) =

Canadian Koreanist

- Awards: John Whitney Hall Book Prize (2004)

Academic background
- Education: University of Toronto (BA, MA); Columbia University (PhD)

Academic work
- Discipline: Korean history
- Institutions: University of Toronto

Andre H. Schmid is a Canadian academic, author and former Director of the Centre for the Study of Korea at the University of Toronto.

== Biography ==
He received his undergraduate degree from the University of Toronto. Schmid was awarded his Ph.D. at Columbia University in New York.

Schmid is associate professor in the Department of East Asian Studies at the University of Toronto. His research interests include the cultural history of the Cold War and the historiographical literature on 19th century peasant movements. He is best known for his award-winning 2002 book, Korea Between Empires, 1895-1919 (Columbia University Press).

In 2004, he won the Association for Asian Studies, John Whitney Hall Book Prize.

== Selected works ==
In a statistical overview derived from writings by and about Roman Ghirshman, OCLC/WorldCat encompasses roughly 10+ works in 20+ publications in 5 languages and 1,000+ library holdings.

- Constructing Independence: Nation and Identity in Korea, 1895-1910 (1996)
- Nation Work: Asian Elites and National Identities (2000)
- Korea between Empires, 1895-1919 (2002)

Articles

- "Rediscovering Manchuria: Sin Ch'aeho and the Politics of Territorial History in Korea," The Journal of Asian Studies, Vol. 56, No. 1 (February 1997).
- "Colonialism and the 'Korea Problem' in the Historiography of Japan: A Review Article," The Journal of Asian Studies, Vol. 59, No. 4 (November 2000), pp 951–976.
- "Looking North toward Manchuria," The South Atlantic Quarterly, Vol. 99, No. 1, Winter 2000, pp. 219–240.
- Review of "Marginality and Subversion in Korea: the Hong Kyŏngnae Rebellion of 1812," Harvard Journal of Asiatic Studies, Vol. 70, No. 1, June 2010, pp. 257–264.
