= Ann Jannetta =

American historian

Ann Bowman Jannetta (born 1932) is an American academic, historian, author, Japanologist and Professor of History Emerita at the University of Pittsburgh.

== Selected works ==
In a statistical overview derived from writings by and about Ann Jannetta, OCLC/WorldCat encompasses roughly 4 works in 10+ publications in 1 language and 500+ library holdings

- Epidemics and mortality in Tokugawa Japan: 1600-1868 (1983)
- Public health and the diffusion of vaccination in Japan (1996)
- The vaccinators: smallpox, medical knowledge, and the "opening" of Japan (2007)

== Honors ==
- Association for Asian Studies, John Whitney Hall Book Prize, 2009.
