= Falun Gong: The End of Days =

Book by Maria Hsia Chang

- Cover
- Author: Maria Hsia Chang
- Language: English
- Subject: Falun Gong
- Publisher: Yale University Press
- Publication date: 2004
- Pages: 188
- ISBN: 0-300-10227-5
- OCLC: 182530364
- Dewey Decimal: 322'.1'0951
- LC Class: BP605.F36C47 2004

Falun Gong: The End of Days is a book by Maria Hsia Chang about the Falun Gong.

Bradley Winterton, in Times Literary Supplement, stated that the book's main idea is that Falun Gong only became political after the Chinese government began to suppress it. Steve Schroeder of Booklist stated that, according to the book, political movements can come from groups that would be "ostensibly apolitical".

== Background ==
The author is a political scientist who originates from China, and is an instructor in that field at the University of Nevada.

The book uses journalism articles and Li Hongzhi's texts as sources, but does not use other primary sources nor fieldwork. David A. Palmer wrote that the sourcing includes anti-Chinese Communist Party (CCP), pro-Falun Gong "alleged but unverified “facts” ".

== Contents ==
"A religious sect defies the state," Chapter 1, is a history of the Falun Gong. Chinese religious movements in general, and how they interact with millenarianist groups, are the topics of Chapter 2, "Chinese religions and millenarian movements." Falun Gong's beliefs according to Li Hongzhi's texts are outlines in the third, "Beliefs and practices." The criminal charges from the Chinese central government against people in the Falun Gong movement are outlined in the fourth, "The state vs. falun gong." A criticism against said legal arguments and against the CCP in general are then presented in the fifth, "The persecution of other faiths."

== Reception ==
David A. Palmer wrote that the book "is a useful and relatively balanced synthesis of what Western journalists and human rights organizations have been writing on falun gong in the past five years." Palmer stated that due to the nature of the sourcing, "she departs little from the standard Western media “script” on falun gong, i.e. the brutal repression by a totalitarian state of innocent meditators with weird ideas".

Zhonghu Yan of Hope College wrote that the book "offers a balanced view of both this group and the Chinese government." Yan concluded the book is "highly readable" and "scholarly and yet popular."

Schroeder describes the work as "a cautionary tale for modern states and a compelling argument for" allowing new religions to be practiced.

Lucian W. Pye of Foreign Affairs wrote that the book is "an excellent introduction" to Chinese religions in general and Falun Gong in particular.

Ilaria Maria Sala stated in the Far Eastern Economic Review stated that because of the simplicity and the "haphazard and sometimes sloppy manner" of picking the sources, Sala felt that she was "a bit disappointed" in the work even though the author had made "commendable[...]effort" to write her work.

Winterton stated that the book "is concise, lucid, determined to be fair to all sides, and devoid of the kind of jargon that infests academic writing in the humanities."

Publishers Weekly described it as "an objective and scholarly account".
