= Richard J. Samuels =

Richard J. Samuels (born November 2, 1951) is an American academic, political scientist, author, Japanologist, Ford International Professor of Political Science the former Director of the Center for International Studies at the Massachusetts Institute of Technology.

== Early life ==
Samuels was born in Brooklyn, New York and grew up in Westbury on Long Island. He graduated from Colgate University in 1973, received his master's degree from Tufts University in 1974, and was awarded his PhD from the Massachusetts Institute of Technology in 1980.

== Career ==
Samuels's teaching career at MIT has been interrupted periodically for visiting professorships in Tokyo, Rome, Berlin, and elsewhere. He served as head of the MIT Department of Political Science between 1992 and 1997. Samuels has also served as vice-chairman of the Committee on Japan of the National Research Council, and as chairman of the Japan-US Friendship Commission, an independent federal grant-making agency that supports Japanese studies and policy-oriented research in the United States. He served concurrently as the chair of the U.S. CULCON Panel (U.S.-Japan Conference on Cultural and Educational Interchange), a binational advisory panel to the U.S. and Japanese governments. In 2005 he was elected a member of the American Academy of Arts and Sciences and in 2011 he received the Order of the Rising Sun, Gold and Silver Star, an imperial decoration awarded by the Emperor of Japan and the Japanese Prime Minister. He is one of only three scholars (Japanese or foreign) to have produced more than one scholarly monograph recognized by the Nippon Foundation as one of the top "one hundred books for understanding contemporary Japan". In 2015 he was named an Einstein Fellow at the Free University of Berlin.

From 2003 to 2023 Samuels was director of MIT Center for International Studies.

== Select works ==
In a statistical overview derived from writings by and about Richard Samuels, OCLC/WorldCat encompasses roughly 90+ publications in 4 languages and 3,000+ library holdings

- The Politics of Regional Policy in Japan: Localities Incorporated (Princeton University Press, 1983)
- Getting America Ready for Japanese Science and Technology (University Press of America, 1986)
- The Business of the Japanese State: Energy Markets in Comparative and Historical Perspective (Cornell University Press, 1987) Winner-1988 Masayoshi Ohira Memorial Prize.
- The Political Culture of Foreign Area and International Studies: Essays in Honor of Lucian W. Pye (Brassey's, 1992) (co-editor with Myron Weiner)
- Rich Nation, Strong Army: National Security and the Technological Transformation of Japan (Cornell University Press, 1994) Winner-1996 John Whitney Hall Prize of the Association of Asian Studies and 1996 Arisawa Memorial Prize of the Association of American University Presses.
- Machiavelli's Children: Leaders and their Legacies in Italy and Japan (Cornell University Press, 2003) Winner-2003 Marraro Prize from the Society for Italian Historical Studies and the 2004 Jervis-Schroeder Prize for the best book in International History and Politics, International History and Politics section of the American Political Science Association.
- Crisis and Innovation in Asian Technology (Cambridge University Press, 2003)(co-editor with William Keller)
- Encyclopedia of United States National Security (Sage, 2006)
- Securing Japan: Tokyo's Grand Strategy and the Future of East Asia (Cornell University Press, 2007) Finalist-2008 Lionel Gelber Prize for the best book in international affairs.
- 3.11: Disaster and Change in Japan (Cornell University Press, 2013)
- Special Duty: A History of the Japanese Intelligence Community (Cornell University Press, 2019) Named one of the “Best of Books 2019” by the Council on Foreign Relations’ journal, Foreign Affairs.

His articles have appeared in Foreign Affairs, International Security, Foreign Policy, Washington Quarterly, International Organization, Political Science Quarterly, The Journal of Modern Italian Studies, The National Interest, The Journal of Japanese Studies, Daedalus, and other policy and scholarly journals.

== Honors ==
- Albert Einstein Foundation Fellow, 2015.
- American Academy of Arts and Sciences, 2005.
- American Political Science Association Jervis-Schroeder Book Prize, 2004.
- Edwin McClellan Visiting Fellow in Japanese Studies, Yale, 2004.
- Abe Fellowship, Social Science Research Council, 1998
- Association for Asian Studies, John Whitney Hall Book Prize, 1994.
- Council on Foreign Relations, 1992-
- National Science Foundation Fellowship, 1991-1992
- Fulbright Fellowships: 1991-1992, 1983–1984, 1977–1978
