= Melinda Takeuchi =

American academic, author and Japanologist

Melinda Takeuchi is an American academic, author, and Japanologist. She is a Professor in the Department of East Asian Languages and Cultures and the Department of Art History at Stanford University.

== Early life ==
Takeuchi grew up in what was then rural-Malibu in Southern California. In 1966, she earned a B.A. in Asian Studies at the University of California, Santa Barbara (UCSB). She continued her studies at UCSB, earning a M.A. with Honors in the History of Art in 1972. In Japan in 1975–1976, she was a Research Fellow at Waseda University in Tokyo.

Takeuchi was awarded her Ph.D. in the History of Art in 1979 at the University of Michigan.

== Career ==
Takeuchi invested thirty years climbing the tenure-track ladder at Stanford.

Once you reach a certain watershed in your career — for me, it was getting tenure at Stanford — you take stock of your life, come up for air, look around and say, 'Is this all there is?' — Melinda Takeuchi

In recent years, Takeuchi's life in academia has been balanced by the activities associated with breeding Friesian horses on a small ranch in Northern California.

== Selected works ==
In a statistical overview derived from writings by and about Melinda Takeuchi, OCLC/WorldCat encompasses roughly 10+ works in 20+ publications in 2 languages and 1,000+ library holdings.

- Poem paintings: [catalog of] an Exhibition 29th November-13th December 1977 (1977)
- Visions of a Wanderer: the True View Paintings of Ike Taiga (1723-1776) (1979)
- Ike Taiga, a Biographical Study (1983)
- Taiga's True Views: the Language of Landscape Painting in Eighteenth-Century Japan (1992)
- Origins of Modern Society: Legacies and Visions of East Asian Cultures. Tape 13, From Modelbook to Sketchbook: Sinophiles, Europhiles, and the Explosion of Visual Thinking in Eighteenth-Century Japanese Art (1992)
- Worlds Seen and Imagined: Japanese Screens from the Idemitsu Museum of Arts: [the Asia Society Galleries, New York], October 18 - December 31, 1995 (1995)
- The Artist as Professional in Japan (2004)
- Revisiting Modern Japanese Prints: Selected Works from the Richard F. Grott Family Collection: Northern Illinois University Art Museum, January 15-March 7, 2008 (2007)

== Honors ==
- 1995: Association for Asian Studies, John Whitney Hall Book Prize, 1997.
