= Japanese people =

日本人

Total population
- c. 125 million

Regions with significant populations
- Japan: 119.3 million

Significant Japanese diaspora in:
- Brazil: 2,700,000 (2023)
- United States: 1,586,652 (2020)
- Peru: 203,130 (2023)
- Canada: 129,425 (2021)
- Philippines: 120,000
- Australia: 105,566 (2025)^{note}
- China: 92,928 (2025)^{note}
- Mexico: 88,985 (2024)
- Argentina: 75,528 (2024)
- Thailand: 72,113 (2025)^{note}
- United Kingdom: 62,270 (2025)^{note}
- Germany: 44,468 (2025)^{note}
- South Korea: 44,471 (2025)^{note}
- France: 36,023 (2025)^{note}
- Singapore: 33,397 (2025)^{note}
- Taiwan: 21,755 (2025)^{note}
- New Zealand: 21,471 (2025)^{note}
- Malaysia: 19,690 (2025)^{note}
- Micronesia: 20,000 (2023)
Other countries (fewer than 20,000)
| Vietnam | 17,410 (2024)^{note} |
| Indonesia | 14,720^{note} |
| Bolivia | 14,000 |
| Netherlands | 10,460 |

Languages
- Japanese

Religion
- Primarily, in a traditional/cultural context, a mix of Shinto and Buddhism; minorities ascribe to Christianity and other religions

Related ethnic groups
- Ainu · Ryukyuan
- Note: For this country, only the number of residents with Japanese nationality is shown, since the number of naturalized Japanese people and their descendants is unknown.

Japanese people (日本人, Nihonjin, Nippon-; Japanese pronunciation: [ɲ̟ì.hó̞ɲ̟́.ɟ̟͡ʑíɴ̀, ɲ̟ìp̚.pó̞ɲ̟́-]) are people or ethnic groups identified with the Japanese archipelago. Japanese people constitute 97.1% of the population of the country of Japan. Approximately 119.9 million Japanese people are residents of Japan, and there are approximately five million members of the Japanese diaspora, known as Nikkeijin (日系人).

In some contexts, the term "Japanese people" might be used to refer specifically to the Yamato people, who are primarily from the historically principal islands of Honshu, Kyushu and Shikoku and constitute by far the largest group. In other contexts, the term could include other groups native to the Japanese archipelago, including Ryukyuan people, who share connections with the Yamato but are often regarded as distinct, and Ainu people. In recent decades, there has also been an increase in the number of people with both Japanese and non-Japanese roots, including those who are half Japanese.

== History ==
=== Theories of origins ===
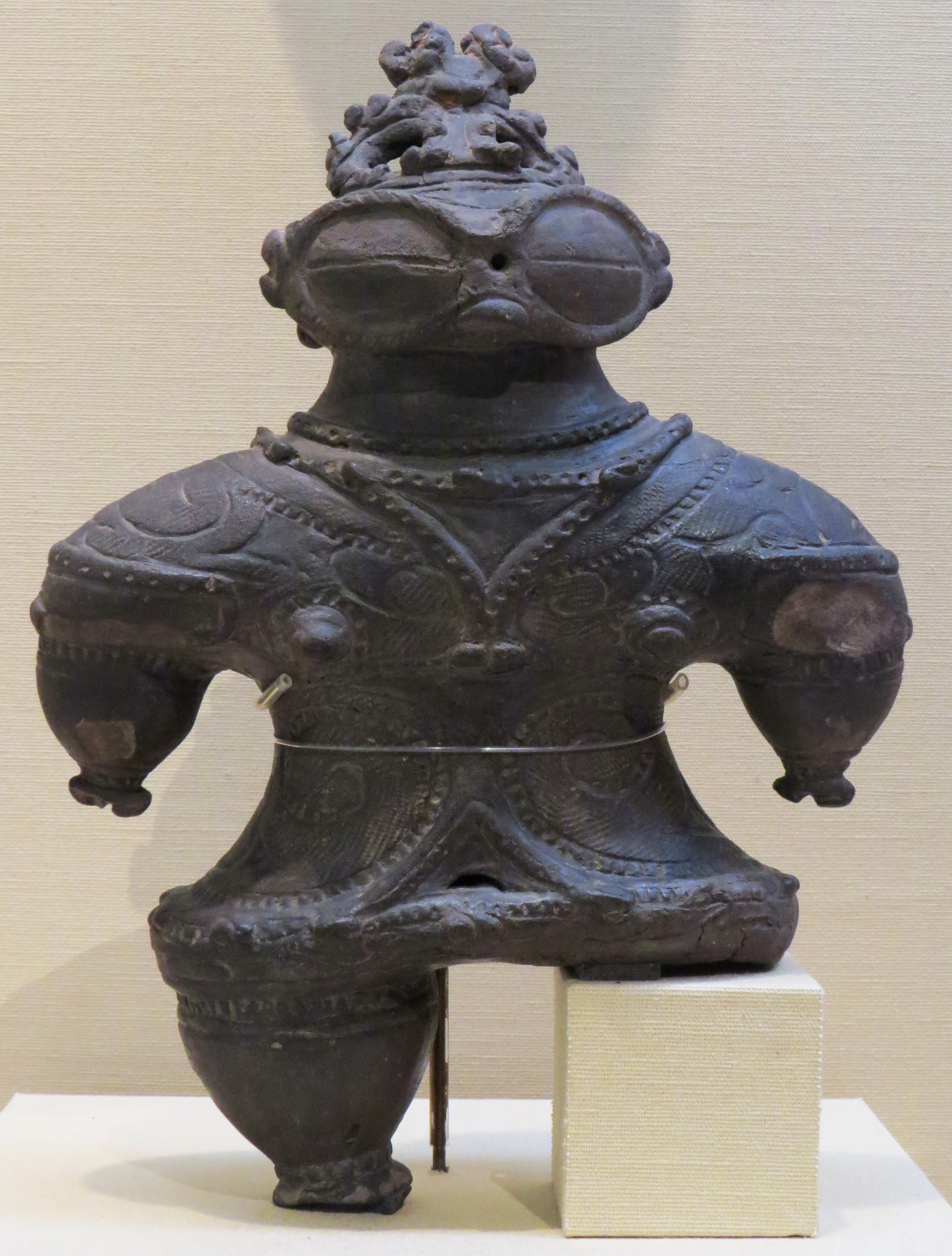
Shakōki-dogū (遮光器土偶) (1000–400 BC), "goggle-eyed type" figurine. Tokyo National Museum

Archaeological evidence indicates that Stone Age people lived in the Japanese archipelago during the Paleolithic period between 39,000 and 21,000 years ago. Japan was then connected to mainland Asia by at least one land bridge, where nomadic hunter-gatherers crossed to Japan. Flint tools and bony implements of this era have been excavated in Japan.

In the 18th century, Arai Hakuseki suggested that the ancient stone tools in Japan were left behind by the Shukushin. Later, Philipp Franz von Siebold argued that the Ainu people were indigenous to northern Japan. Iha Fuyū suggested that Japanese and Ryukyuan people have the same ethnic origin, based on his 1906 research on the Ryukyuan languages. In the Taishō period, Torii Ryūzō claimed that Yamato people used Yayoi pottery and Ainu used Jōmon pottery.

After World War II, Kotondo Hasebe and Hisashi Suzuki claimed that the origin of Japanese people did not lie in newcomers from the Yayoi period (300 BCE – 300 CE) but people from the Jōmon period. However, Kazuro Hanihara announced a new racial admixture theory in 1984 and a "dual structure model" in 1991. According to Hanihara, modern Japanese lineages began with Jōmon people, who moved into the Japanese archipelago during Paleolithic times, followed by a second wave of immigration, from East Asia to Japan during the Yayoi period (300 BC). Following a population expansion in Neolithic times, these newcomers then found their way to the Japanese archipelago sometime during the Yayoi period. As a result, replacement of the hunter-gatherers was common in the island regions of Kyushu, Shikoku, and southern Honshu, but did not prevail in the outlying Ryukyu Islands and Hokkaido, and the Ryukyuan and Ainu people show mixed characteristics. Mark J. Hudson claims that the main ethnic image of Japanese people was biologically and linguistically formed from 400 BCE to 1,200 CE. Currently, the most well-regarded theory is that present-day Japanese people formed from both the Yayoi rice-agriculturalists and the various Jōmon period ethnicities. However, some recent studies have argued that the Jōmon people had more ethnic diversity than originally suggested or that the people of Japan bear significant genetic signatures from three ancient populations, rather than just two.

=== Jōmon and Yayoi periods ===
Some of the world's oldest known pottery pieces were developed by the Jōmon people in the Upper Paleolithic period, dating back as far as 16,000 years. The name "Jōmon" (縄文, Jōmon) means "cord-impressed pattern", and comes from the characteristic markings found on the pottery. The Jōmon people were mostly hunter-gatherers, but also practiced early agriculture, such as Azuki bean cultivation. At least one middle-to-late Jōmon site (Minami Mizote (南溝手), c. 1200–1000 BC) featured a primitive rice-growing agriculture, relying primarily on fish and nuts for protein. The ethnic roots of the Jōmon period population were heterogeneous, and can be traced back to ancient Southeast Asia, the Tibetan Plateau, ancient Taiwan, and Siberia.

Beginning around 300 BC, the Yayoi people originating from Northeast Asia entered the Japanese islands and displaced or intermingled with the Jōmon. The Yayoi brought wet-rice farming and advanced bronze and iron technology to Japan. The more productive paddy field systems allowed the communities to support larger populations and spread over time, in turn becoming the basis for more advanced institutions and heralding the new civilization of the succeeding Kofun period.

The estimated population of Japan in the late Jōmon period was about eight hundred thousand, compared to about three million by the Nara period. Taking the growth rates of hunting and agricultural societies into account, it is calculated that about one-and-a-half million immigrants moved to Japan in the period. According to several studies, the Yayoi created the "Japanese-hierarchical society".

=== Consolidation and feudal periods ===
The period encompassing Japan's feudal and consolidation phases extended from the latter portion of the twelfth century until the middle of the nineteenth century, during which authority progressively shifted from the imperial court to military autocrats known as shoguns, territorial lords referred to as daimyo, and the warrior class composed of samurai.

=== Colonial period ===
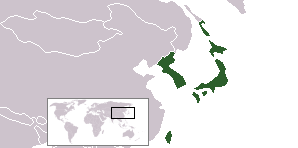
Location of Imperial Japan

During the Japanese colonial period of 1895 to 1945, the phrase "Japanese people" was used to refer not only to residents of the Japanese archipelago, but also to people from colonies who held Japanese citizenship, such as Taiwanese people and Korean people. The official term used to refer to ethnic Japanese during this period was "inland people" (内地人, naichijin). Such linguistic distinctions facilitated forced assimilation of colonized ethnic identities into a single Imperial Japanese identity.

After the end of World War II, the Soviet Union classified many Nivkh people and Orok people from southern Sakhalin, who had been Japanese imperial subjects in Karafuto Prefecture, as Japanese people and repatriated them to Hokkaido. On the other hand, many Sakhalin Koreans who had held Japanese citizenship until the end of the war were left stateless by the Soviet occupation.

== Language ==
The Japanese language is a Japonic language that is related to the Ryukyuan languages and was treated as a language isolate in the past. The earliest attested form of the language, Old Japanese, dates to the 8th century. Japanese phonology is characterized by a relatively small number of vowel phonemes, frequent gemination and a distinctive pitch accent system. The modern Japanese language has a tripartite writing system using hiragana, katakana and kanji. The language includes native Japanese words and a large number of words derived from the Chinese language. In Japan the adult literacy rate in the Japanese language exceeds 99%. Dozens of Japanese dialects are spoken in regions of Japan. For now, Japanese is classified as a member of the Japonic languages or as a language isolate with no known living relatives if Ryukyuan is counted as dialects.

== Religion ==
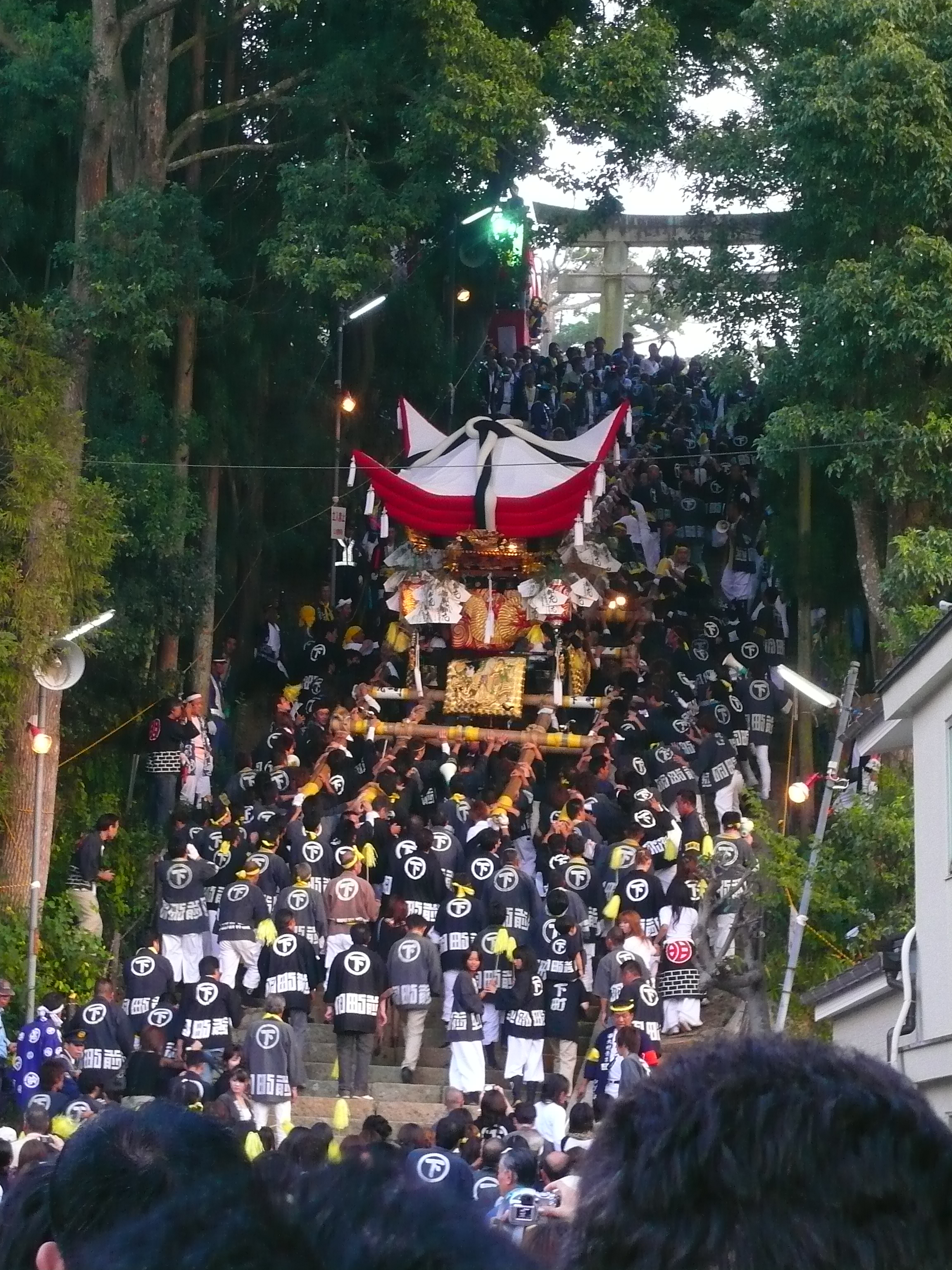
A Shinto festival in Miki, Hyogo

Japanese religion has traditionally been syncretic in nature, combining elements of Buddhism and Shinto (Shinbutsu-shūgō). Shinto, a polytheistic religion with no book of religious canon, is Japan's native religion. Shinto was one of the traditional grounds for the right to the throne of the Japanese imperial family and was codified as the state religion in 1868 (State Shinto), but was abolished by the American occupation in 1945. Mahayana Buddhism came to Japan in the sixth century and evolved into many different sects. Today, the largest form of Buddhism among Japanese people is the Jōdo Shinshū sect founded by Shinran.

A large majority of Japanese people profess to believe in both Shinto and Buddhism.

A significant proportion of members of the Japanese diaspora practice Christianity; about 60% of Japanese Brazilians and 90% of Japanese Mexicans are Roman Catholics, while about 37% of Japanese Americans are Christians (33% Protestant and 4% Catholic).

== Literature ==
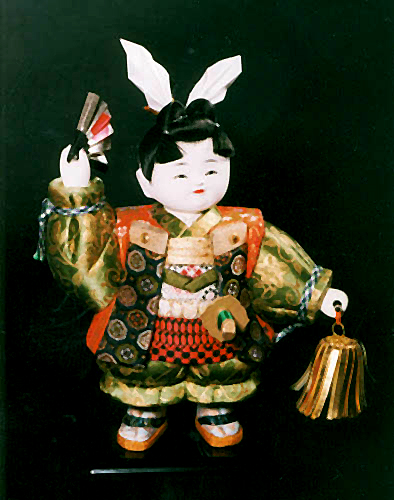
Bisque doll of Momotarō, a character from Japanese literature and folklore

Certain genres of writing originated in and are often associated with Japanese society. These include the haiku, tanka, and I Novel, although modern writers generally avoid these writing styles. Historically, many works have sought to capture or codify traditional Japanese cultural values and aesthetics. Some of the most famous of these include Murasaki Shikibu's The Tale of Genji (1021), about Heian court culture; Miyamoto Musashi's The Book of Five Rings (1645), concerning military strategy; Matsuo Bashō's Oku no Hosomichi (1691), a travelogue; and Jun'ichirō Tanizaki's essay "In Praise of Shadows" (1933), which contrasts Eastern and Western cultures.

Following the opening of Japan to the West in 1854, some works of this style were written in English by natives of Japan; they include Bushido: The Soul of Japan by Nitobe Inazō (1900), concerning samurai ethics, and The Book of Tea by Okakura Kakuzō (1906), which deals with the philosophical implications of the Japanese tea ceremony. Western observers have often attempted to evaluate Japanese society as well, to varying degrees of success; one of the most well-known and controversial works resulting from this is Ruth Benedict's The Chrysanthemum and the Sword (1946).

Twentieth-century Japanese writers recorded changes in Japanese society through their works. Some of the most notable authors included Natsume Sōseki, Jun'ichirō Tanizaki, Osamu Dazai, Fumiko Enchi, Akiko Yosano, Yukio Mishima, and Ryōtarō Shiba. Popular contemporary authors such as Ryū Murakami, Haruki Murakami, and Banana Yoshimoto have been translated into many languages and enjoy international followings, and Yasunari Kawabata and Kenzaburō Ōe were awarded the Nobel Prize in Literature.

== Arts ==
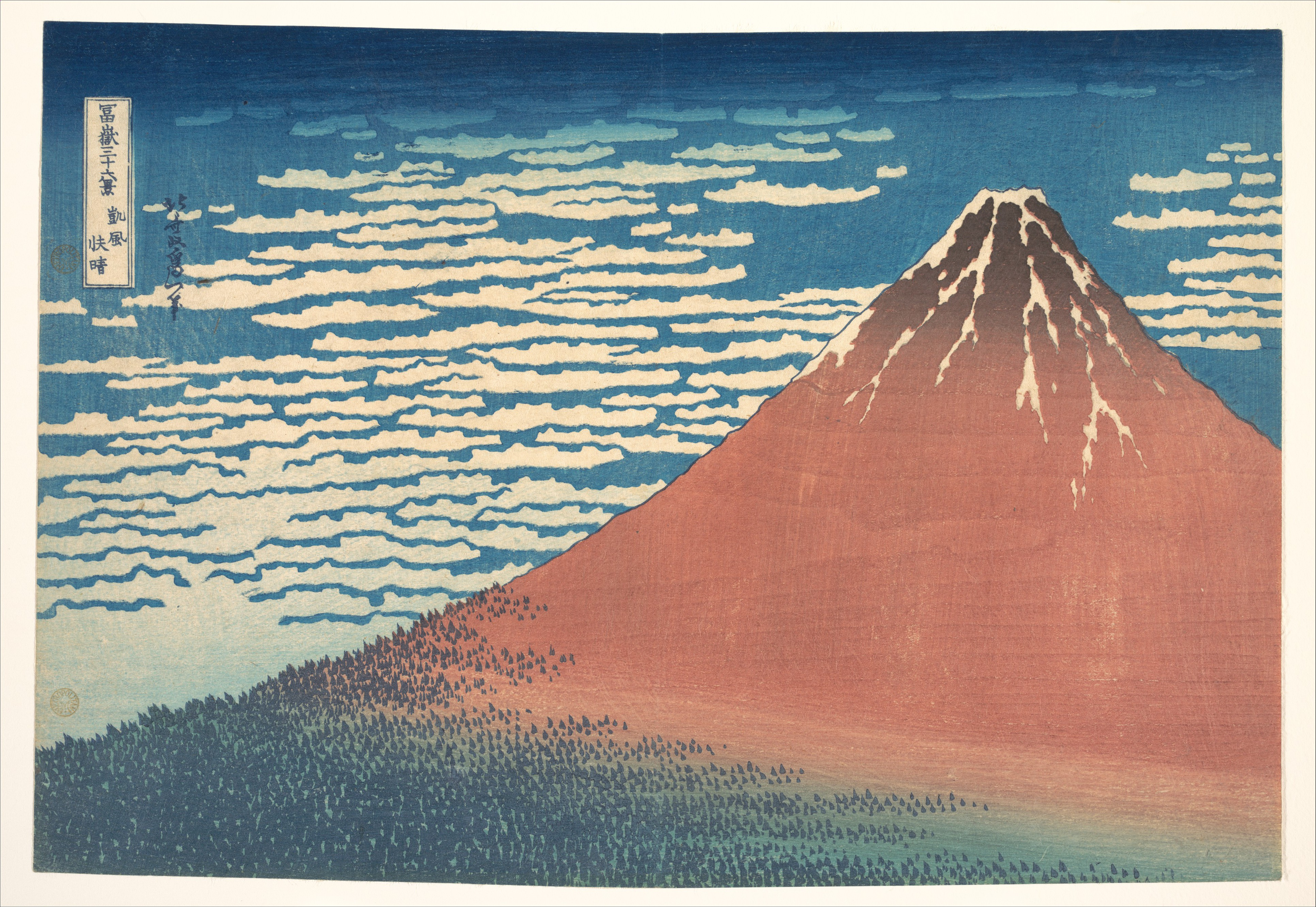
The print Red Fuji from Katsushika Hokusai's series, Thirty-six Views of Mount Fuji

Decorative arts in Japan date back to prehistoric times. Jōmon pottery includes examples with elaborate ornamentation. In the Yayoi period, artisans produced mirrors, spears, and ceremonial bells known as dōtaku. Later burial mounds, or kofun, preserve characteristic clay figures known as haniwa, as well as wall paintings.

Beginning in the Nara period, painting, calligraphy, and sculpture flourished under strong Confucian and Buddhist influences from China. Among the architectural achievements of this period are the Hōryū-ji and the Yakushi-ji, two Buddhist temples in Nara Prefecture. After the cessation of official relations with the Tang dynasty in the ninth century, Japanese art and architecture gradually became less influenced by China. Extravagant art and clothing were commissioned by nobles to decorate their court, and although the aristocracy was quite limited in size and power, many of these pieces are still extant. After the Tōdai-ji was attacked and burned during the Genpei War, a special office of restoration was founded, and the Tōdai-ji became an important artistic center. The leading masters of the time were Unkei and Kaikei.

Painting advanced in the Muromachi period in the form of ink wash painting under the influence of Zen Buddhism as practiced by such masters as Sesshū Tōyō. Zen Buddhist tenets were also incorporated into the tea ceremony during the Sengoku period. During the Edo period, the polychrome painting screens of the Kanō school were influential thanks to their powerful patrons (including the Tokugawa clan). Popular artists created ukiyo-e, woodblock prints for sale to commoners in the flourishing cities. Pottery such as Imari ware was highly valued as far away as Europe.

In theater, Noh is a traditional, spare dramatic form that developed in tandem with kyōgen farce. In stark contrast to the restrained refinement of noh, kabuki, an "explosion of color", uses every possible stage trick for dramatic effect. Plays include sensational events such as suicides, and many such works were performed both in kabuki and in bunraku puppet theater.

Since the Meiji Restoration, Japanese art has been influenced by many elements of Western culture. Contemporary decorative, practical, and performing arts works range from traditional forms to purely modern modes. Products of popular culture, including J-pop, J-rock, manga, and anime have found audiences around the world.

== Citizenship ==
Article 10 of the Constitution of Japan defines the term "Japanese" based upon Japanese nationality (citizenship) alone, without regard for ethnicity. The Government of Japan considers all naturalized and native-born Japanese nationals with a multi-ethnic background "Japanese", and in the national census the Japanese Statistics Bureau asks only about nationality, so there is no official census data on the variety of ethnic groups in Japan. While this has contributed to or reinforced the widespread belief that Japan is ethnically homogeneous, as shown in the claim of former Japanese Prime Minister Tarō Asō that Japan is a nation of "one race, one civilization, one language and one culture", some scholars have argued that it is more accurate to describe the country of Japan as a multiethnic society.

Children born to international couples receive Japanese nationality when one parent is a Japanese national. However, Japanese law states that children who are dual citizens must choose one nationality before the age of 20. Studies estimate that 1 in 30 children born in Japan are born to interracial couples, and these children are sometimes referred to as hāfu (half Japanese).

== Diaspora ==
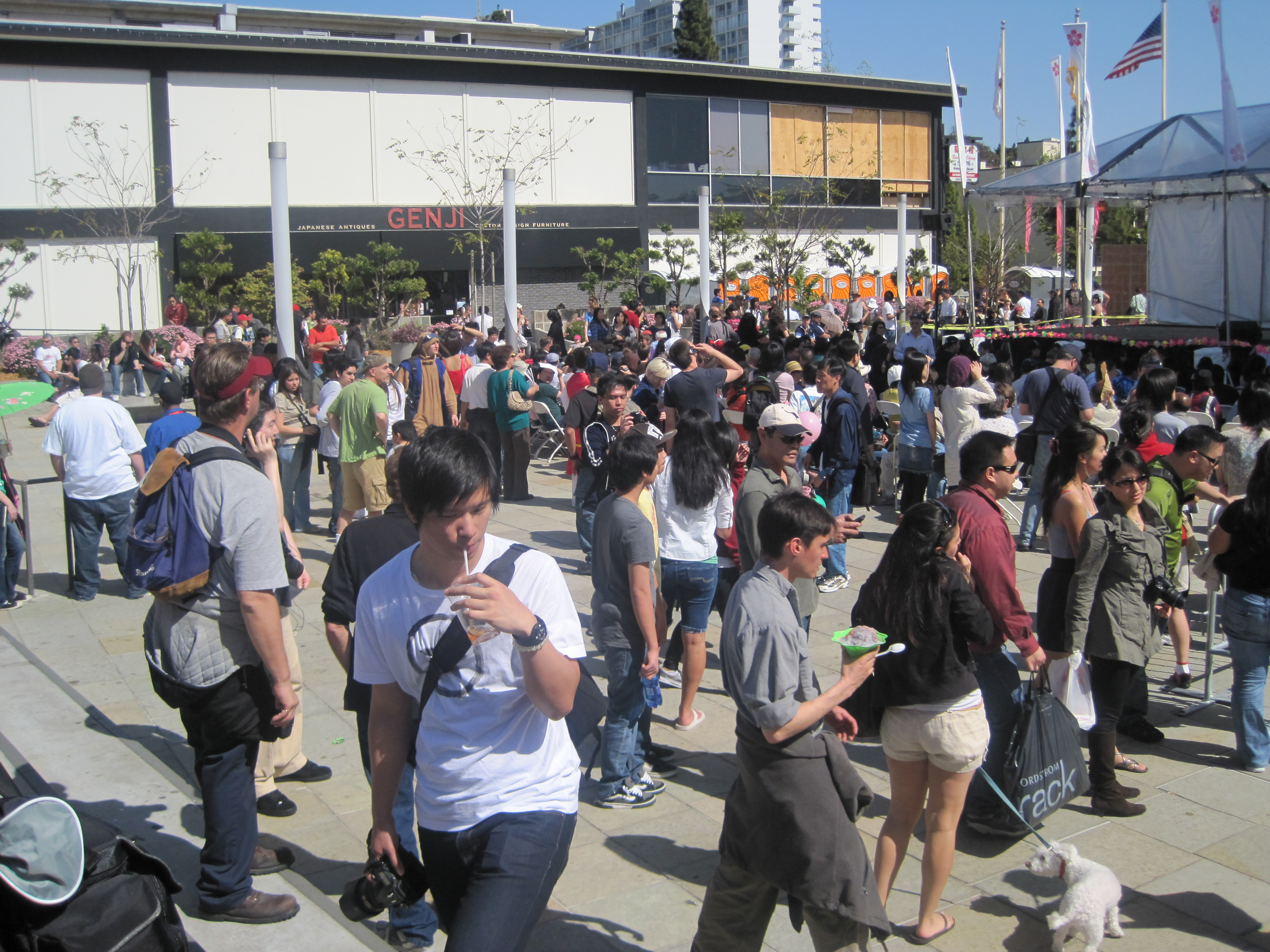
The Japantown Peace Plaza during the Northern California Cherry Blossom Festival

The term Nikkeijin (日系人) is used to refer to Japanese people who emigrated from Japan and their descendants.

Emigration from Japan was recorded as early as the 15th century to the Philippines and Borneo, and in the 16th and 17th centuries, thousands of traders from Japan also migrated to the Philippines and assimilated into the local population. However, migration of Japanese people did not become a mass phenomenon until the Meiji era, when Japanese people began to go to the United States, the United Kingdom, Brazil, Canada, the Philippines, China, and Peru. There was also significant emigration to the territories of the Empire of Japan during the colonial period, but most of these emigrants and settlers repatriated to Japan after the end of World War II in Asia.

According to Japan's Ministry of Foreign Affairs, there are about five million Nikkeijin living in their adopted countries. The largest of these foreign communities are in the Brazilian states of São Paulo and Paraná. There are also significant cohesive Japanese communities in the Philippines, East Malaysia, Peru, the U.S. states of Hawaii, California, and Washington, and the Canadian cities of Vancouver and Toronto. Separately, the number of Japanese citizens living abroad is over one million according to the Ministry of Foreign Affairs.

== See also ==
- Ethnic issues in Japan
- Foreign-born Japanese
- Japantown
- List of Japanese people
- Nihonjinron
- Demographics of Japan
  - Burakumin
  - Dekasegi
- Azumi people, an ancient group of peoples who inhabited parts of northern Kyushu
- Emishi, a group of people who lived in the northeastern Tōhoku region of Japan
