= The Cambridge History of Korea =

Upcoming series of books on Korea

- Author: Donald Baker (ed.)
- Country: United Kingdom
- Language: English
- Genre: Korean history
- Publisher: Cambridge University Press
- Published: In progress
- No. of books: 4

The Cambridge History of Korea is a forthcoming series of books to be published by Cambridge University Press surveying the history of Korea in four separate volumes from prehistory to the twenty-first century. According to series editor Donald L. Baker (University of British Columbia), the set will aim to be broad, accurate, and up to date, providing both a thorough survey of Korean history as well as comparative perspective of Korea's relationship with its neighbors.

The first volume will cover Korea's ancient history, and is to be edited by Mark E. Byington (Harvard University) and Richard D. McBride II (Brigham Young University). The second volume will cover the Goryeo period, edited by Sem Vermeersch (Seoul National University). The third volume will cover Joseon, edited by Michael J. Pettid (Binghamton University). The fourth volume, covering Korea's modern history, will be edited by Bruce Cumings (University of Chicago) and Namhee Lee (University of California, Los Angeles).

== History ==
Work on the Cambridge History of Korea was originally started in the 1990s by editorship of James B. Palais (University of Washington). Due to a lack of scholars specialized in the field in English, progress was slow, eventually stopping with his death in 2006 until work on the series was renewed under Donald L. Baker in 2016. In preparation, contributors have met in three workshops thus far: in October 2018 at the University of Pennsylvania for volumes 1, 2, and 3 (organized by Eugene Y. Park; supported by the Academy of Korean Studies); in June 2019 at Seoul National University for volume 2 (organized by Sem Vermeersch); and in August 2019 at the University of Chicago for volume 4 (organized by Michael D. Shin). Since March 2021, the COVID-19 pandemic has put any additional meetings on hold.
