= Evan S. Lieberman =

Political scientist

Evan S. Lieberman is the director of the Center for International Studies (CIS) at the Massachusetts Institute of Technology, the Total Professor of Political Science and Contemporary Africa, and the faculty director for the MIT International Science and Technology Initiatives (MISTI) and the Global Diversity Lab (GDL). Lieberman is an E-GAP network member, a Canadian Institute for Advanced Research (CIFAR) fellow, and co-coordinator of the Boston-area Working Group on African Political-Economy (BWGAPE).

Lieberman received his BA in political science from Princeton University and his PhD in political science from the University of California, Berkeley.

From 1997 to 1998 he was a Fulbright fellow in South Africa, and from 2000 to 2002 he was a Robert Wood Johnson health policy scholar at Yale University. Lieberman has received the David Collier Mid-Career Award, the Giovanni Sartori book prize, the Mattei Dogan book prize, and the 2002 Mary Parker Follett article award.

He was the former professor and associate chair in the Department of Politics at Princeton University.

== Publications ==
- Race and Regionalism in the Politics of Taxation in Brazil and South Africa (Cambridge University Press, 2003.)
- Nested Analysis as a Mixed-Method Strategy for Comparative Research (American Political Science Review, 2005.)
- Ethnic Politics, Risk, and Policy-Making: A Cross-National Statistical Analysis of Government Responses to HIV/AIDS (Comparative Political Studies; 40; 1407, 2007.)
- Boundaries of Contagion: How Ethnic Politics have Shaped Government Responses to AIDS (Princeton University Press, 2009.)
- Does Information Lead to More Active Citizenship? Evidence from an Education Intervention in Rural Kenya (with Lily Tsai and Dan Posner.) (World Development, Vol. 60, August 2014.)
- Can the Biomedical Research Cycle Be a Model for Political Science? (Perspectives on Politics, vol. 14, no. 4, 2016.)
- Response to Symposium Reviewers. (Perspectives on Politics, vol. 14, no. 4, 2016.)
- Census Enumeration and Group Conflict: A Global Analysis of the Consequences of Counting (with Prerna Singh). (World Politics January 2017.)
- Nuanced Accountability: Voter Responses to Service Delivery in Southern Africa (with Daniel de Kadt). (British Journal of Political Science, December 2017.)
- Until We Have Won Our Liberty: South Africa after Apartheid (Princeton University Press, 2022).
