= Andrew Watsky =

American art historian

Andrew Mark Watsky (born May 12, 1957) is an American academic, art historian, author and university professor.

== Early life ==
Watsky was awarded his bachelor's degree from Oberlin College and his master's degree and doctorate from Princeton University.

== Career ==
Watsky is a professor in the Department of Art and Archaeology at Princeton; and he is director of graduate studies. Previously, he was associate professor of Japanese and Chinese art history at Vassar College.

In addition to his work with traditional Japanese art history, Watsky has an interest in recent Japanese art. This stems from an earlier career at a contemporary art gallery in Tokyo.

== Selected works ==
In a statistical overview derived from writings by and about Andrew Watsky, OCLC/WorldCat encompasses roughly 2 works in 5 publications in 1 language and 300+ library holding.

- The Art of the Ensemble: the Tsukubusuma Sanctuary, 1570–1615 (1994)
- Chikubushima: Deploying the Sacred Arts in Momoyama Japan (2004)

== Honors ==
- Guggenheim Fellowship, 2007–2008.
- Association for Asian Studies, John Whitney Hall Book Prize, 2006.
- Smithsonian Institution, Sackler-Freer Galleries, Shimada Prize, 2006.
