= Mark J. Hudson =

British archaeologist (born 1963)

Mark James Hudson (born 10 July 1963, in Roade) is a British archaeologist, historian and author. His research focuses on premodern Japan in comparative context. He is the author and editor of numerous books. He excavated the Nagabaka site on Miyako Island. He is a Fellow of the Royal Historical Society.

== Education ==
Hudson was educated at Northampton School for Boys and the School of Oriental and African Studies, University of London (BA, 1986). He was awarded his M.Phil. in East Asian Archaeology at the University of Cambridge in 1988. He earned his Ph.D. at the Australian National University in 1996. His doctoral dissertation was published as Ruins of Identity: Ethnogenesis in the Japanese Islands (Hawaii University Press, 1999).

== Career ==
Hudson was a Professor of Anthropology at Nishikyushu University until 2016. He previously taught at Okayama University and the University of Tsukuba. From 2016 to 2018 he was professor at the Shizuoka Mt. Fuji World Heritage Centre but left citing issues of academic harassment from Shizuoka Prefecture. He is currently a Researcher in the Language and Anthropocene Research Group at the Max Planck Institute of Geoanthropology.

== Publications ==
A list of Hudson's publications can be found on Google Scholar Citations

=== Books ===
- Multicultural Japan: Palaeolithic to Postmodern (Cambridge University Press, 1996) (co-editor with Donald Denoon, Gavan McCormack and Tessa Morris-Suzuki)
- Ruins of identity: Ethnogenesis in the Japanese Islands. University of Hawaii Press. 1999.
- Beyond Ainu Studies: Changing Academic and Public Perspectives. University of Hawaii Press. 2014. (co-editor)
- Multidisciplinary Studies of the Environment and Civilization: Japanese Perspectives. Routledge. 2017.
- G. Fagan, L. Fibiger, M. Hudson, M. Trundle (eds.), The Cambridge World History of Violence, Vol. 1: Prehistory and Antiquity (Cambridge University Press, 2020).
- Bronze Age Maritime and Warrior Dynamics in Island East Asia (Cambridge University Press, 2022)
- Conjuring Up Prehistory: Landscape and the Archaic in Japanese Nationalism (Oxford: Archaeopress, 2021).
- Martine Robbeets and Mark Hudson (eds.), The Oxford Handbook of Archaeology and Language (Oxford University Press, 2025)
- Europe and the End of Medieval Japan (Leeds: Arc Humanities Press, 2024).
- M. Hudson and M. Robbeets (eds.) Agropastoralism and Languages Across Eurasia: Expansion, Exchange and Environment. Oxford: BAR (2023)
- 24 Hours in Shōgun's Japan (Michael O’Mara Books, 2026).

== Honors ==
- Association for Asian Studies, John Whitney Hall Book Prize, 2004.
