= Timothy S. George =

American historian

Timothy S. George is a professor of History and Chair of the University of Rhode Island Department of History. He specializes in Postwar Japanese history, Citizen-corporation-state relations in Japan from Meiji through Shōwa, local history, and environmental history. A Fulbright Scholar, George's research has been reviewed in Environmental History, The Journal of Asian Studies, Social Science Japan Journal, and the Journal of Japanese Studies. He is a faculty affiliate of Harvard University's Program on U.S.-Japan Relations.

== Education and background ==
George graduated Stanford University A. B. in 1977, the University of Hawaiʻi at Mānoa with his M.A. in 1984, and then attended Harvard University, where he earned his A.M. in 1993 and his Ph.D. in 1996.

== Selected honors and awards ==
- 2008-2009: Winner of the URI Center for the Humanities Faculty Research Grant.
- 2013: Winner of the U.S. Fulbright Scholarship to study at the University of Tokyo.

== Selected publications ==
=== Books by George ===
- Japan since 1945: From Postwar to Post-Bubble. (Bloomsbury, 2012) Edited with Christopher Gerteis. ISBN 9781441101181
- Minamata: Pollution and the Struggle for Democracy in Postwar Japan. (Harvard University Asia Center, 2001) paperback 2002. ISBN 9780674007857
- Japanese History and Culture from Ancient to Modern Times: Seven Basic Bibliographies. Second edition. (Markus Wiener, 1995) Edited with John W. Dower. ISBN 1558760970

=== Books with contributions by George ===
- "Toroku: Mountain Dreams, Chemical Nightmares in Rural Japan." Japan at Nature's Edge: The Environmental Context of a Global Power, ed. Ian Jared Miller, Julia Adeney Thomas, Brett L. Walker. University of Hawai'i Press, 2013. ISBN 978-0-8248-3876-8
- "Furusato-zukuri: Saving Home Towns by Reinventing Them." Japan since 1945: From Postwar to Post-Bubble, ed. Christopher Gerteis and Timothy S. George. Bloomsbury, 2012. ISBN 9781441101181
- "Revisiting the History of Postwar Japan." Japan since 1945: From Postwar to Post-Bubble, ed. Christopher Gerteis and Timothy S. George. Bloomsbury, 2012. With Christopher Gerteis ISBN 9781441101181

=== Articles ===
- "Fukushima in Light of Minamata." The Asia-Pacific Journal, Vol 10, Issue 11, No 5 (March 12, 2012).
- "The Global Article Nine Conference to Abolish War." Co-authored with Franziska Seraphim. Japanese Constitutional Revision Research Project, Harvard University, 2008.
- "Meiji Restoration" and "Environment: East Asia." The Oxford Encyclopedia of the Modern World, ed. Peter N. Stearns. Oxford University Press, 2008. ISBN 9780195341126
- "Tanaka ShÅzÅ's Vision of an Alternative Constitutional Modernity for Japan." Public Spheres, Private Lives in Modern Japan, ed. Gail Bernstein, Andrew Gordon, Kate Nakai. Harvard University Asia Center, forthcoming in 2005. ISBN 9780674016514
- Entries on "Allied occupation," "Bullet train," "General strike," "Land reform," "Lockheed scandal," "Minamata disease," "Minobe administration," "Postwar constitution," "Recruit scandal," "Sagawa KyÅ«bin scandal," "Scandals," "Self-Defense Forces," "Surrender," and "Tokyo Olympics." Encyclopedia of Contemporary Japanese Culture, ed. Sandra Buckley. Routledge, 2002. ISBN 041548152X

=== Translations ===
- Saitō Hisashi. Niigata Minamata Disease. Co-editor and co-translator. Niigata: Niigata Nippō, 2009. ISBN 978-4-86132-358-4
- Harada Masazumi. Minamata Disease. Editor of translation. Translated with Tsushima Sachie. Kumamoto: Kumamoto Nichinichi Shinbun, 2004.
- “The Message from Minamata to the World.” Minamata Disease Center Sōshisha, 2002. Pamphlet translated with Karen R. Colligan-Taylor.
- “Minamata Exhibition English Guide.” Minamata Forum, 2001. Pamphlet translated with Tanaka Michi, Itō Yutaka, Kawashiri Chizu, Noda Reiko, Okada Kazuko, and Katō Masakatsu.
