= Earl Pritchard =

Earl Pritchard may refer to:

- Earl A. Pritchard (1884–?), American football, basketball and baseball coach
- Earl H. Pritchard (1907–1995), scholar of China
