= Lori Meeks =

Scholar of Buddhism in Japan

- Awards: John Whitney Hall Book Prize (2012)

Academic background
- Education: Columbia University (BA); Princeton University (PhD)

Academic work
- Discipline: Buddhism in Japan
- Institutions: University of Southern California

Lori Meeks is an American academic. She is an associate professor of religion and East Asian languages and cultures at the University of Southern California.

== Biography ==
Meeks received her BA from Columbia University and PhD from Princeton University. Her research has focused on the social, cultural, and intellectual histories of Buddhism in Japan, with a special focus on the roles of women in the religious worlds of premodern East Asia. She is currently on the faculty of the University of Southern California.

Meeks received the 2012 John Whitney Hall Book Prize from the Association for Asian Studies for her book Hokkeji and the Reemergence of Female Monastic Orders in Premodern Japan (2011). She is also a two-time ACLS Fellow.
