= Ken Ito =

Ken Ito may refer to:

- Ken Ito (politician) (born 1944), American politician in the Hawaii House of Representatives
- Ken K. Ito, professor emeritus of Japanese literature
