= John Whitney Hall Book Prize =

The John Whitney Hall Book Prize has been awarded annually since 1994 by the Association for Asian Studies (AAS). Pioneer Japanese studies scholar John Whitney Hall is commemorated in the name of this prize.

The Hall Prize acknowledges an outstanding English language book published on Japan (previously Japan or Korea, prior to the creation of the Palais Prize in 2010).

== AAS prize ==
AAS is a scholarly, non-political, non-profit professional association open to all persons interested in Asia. The association was founded in 1941 as publisher of the Far Eastern Quarterly (now the Journal of Asian Studies). The organization has gone through a series of reorganizations since those early days; but its continuing function serves to further an exchange of information among scholars to increase understanding about East, South, and Southeast Asia.

=== List of honorees ===
- 1994 – Carter J. Eckert, Offspring of Empire, the Koch’ang Kims and the Colonial Origins of Korean Capitalism, 1876–1945 (University of Washington Press, 1991)
- 1995 – Melinda Takeuchi, Taiga’s True Views: The Language of Landscape Painting in Eighteenth-Century Japan (Stanford University Press, 1993)
- 1996 – Richard J. Samuels, Rich Nation, Strong Army: National Security and the Technological Transformation of Japan (Cornell University Press, 1994)
- 1997 – John Whittier Treat, Writing Ground Zero: Japanese Literature and the Atomic Bomb (University of Chicago Press, 1995)
- 1998 – James Palais, Confucian Statecraft and Korean Institutions: Yu Hyongwon and the Late Choson Dynasty (University of Washington Press, 1996)
- 1999 – Susan B. Hanley, Everyday Things in Premodern Japan: The Hidden Legacy of Material Culture (University of California Press, 1997)
- 2000 – William M. Tsutsui, Manufacturing Ideology: Scientific Management in Twentieth-Century Japan (Princeton University Press, 1998)
- 2001 – Mark J. Hudson, Ruins of Identity: Ethnogenesis in the Japanese Islands (University of Hawaii Press, 1999)
- 2002 – Thomas Lamarre, Uncovering Heian Japan: An Archeology of Sensation and Inscription (Duke University Press, 2000)
- 2003 – E. Taylor Atkins, Blue Nippon: Authenticating Jazz in Japan (Duke University Press, 2001)
- 2004 – Andre Schmid, Korea Between Empires, 1895–1919 (Columbia University Press, 2002)
- 2005 – Jordan Sand, House and Home in Modern Japan: Architecture, Domestic Space, and Bourgeois Culture, 1880–1930 (Harvard University Asia Center, 2003).
- 2006 – Andrew M. Watsky, Chikubushima: Deploying the Sacred Arts in Momoyama Japan (University of Washington Press, 2004).
- 2007 – Eiko Ikegami, Bonds of Civility: Aesthetic Networks and the Political Origins of Japanese Culture (Cambridge University Press, 2005)
- 2008 – Karen Nakamura, Deaf in Japan: Signing and the Politics of Identity (Cornell University Press, 2006)
- 2009 – Ann Jannetta, The Vaccinators: Smallpox, Medical Knowledge, and the ‘Opening’ of Japan (Stanford University Press, 2007)
- 2010 – Ken K. Ito, An Age of Melodrama: Family, Gender, and Social Hierarchy in the Turn-of-the Century Japanese Novel (Stanford University Press, 2008)
- 2011 – Karen Thornber, Empire of Texts in Motion: Chinese, Korean, and Taiwanese Transculturations of Japanese Literature (Harvard University Press, 2009)
- 2012 – Lori Meeks, Hokkeji and the Reemergence of Female Monastic Orders in Premodern Japan (University of Hawai'i Press, 2010)
- 2013 – Mary C. Brinton, Lost in Transition: Youth, Work and Instability in Postindustrial Japan (Cambridge University Press, 2011)
- 2014 – Yukio Lippit, Painting of the Realm: The Kano House of Painters in 17th-Century Japan (University of Washington Press, 2012)
- 2015 – Fabian Drixler, Mabiki: Infanticide and Population Growth in Eastern Japan, 1660-1950 (University of California Press, 2013)
- 2016 – Ran Zwigenberg, Hiroshima: The Origins of Global Memory Culture (Cambridge University Press, 2014)
- 2017 – Noriko Manabe, The Revolution Will Not Be Televised: Protest Music After Fukushima (Oxford University Press, 2015).
- 2017 Honorable Mention— Federico Marcon, The Knowledge of Nature and the Nature of Knowledge in Early Modern Japan (University of Chicago Press, 2015)
- 2018 – Satoko Shimazaki, Edo Kabuki in Transition: From the Worlds of the Samurai to the Vengeful Female Ghost(Columbia University Press, 2015)
- 2018 Honorable Mention— Yoshikuni Igarashi, Homecomings: The Belated Return of Japan’s Lost Soldiers (Columbia University Press, 2016)
- 2019 – Bryan D. Lowe, Ritualized Writing: Buddhist Practice and Scriptural Cultures in Ancient Japan (University of Hawai'i Press, 2017)
- 2020 – Aiko Takeuchi-Demirci, Contraceptive Diplomacy: Reproductive Politics and Imperial Ambitions in the United States and Japan (Stanford University Press, 2018)
- 2020 Honorable Mention – Maren A. Ehlers, Give and Take: Poverty and the Status Order in Early Modern Japan (Harvard University Press, 2018)
- 2021 – Benjamin Uchiyama, Japan's Carnival War: Mass Culture on the Home Front, 1937-1945 (Cambridge University Press, 2019)
- 2021 Honorable Mention – Kirsten L. Ziomek, Lost Histories: Recovering the Lives of Japan's Colonial Peoples (Harvard University Asia Center, 2019)
- 2022 – Gabriele Koch, Healing Labor: Japanese Sex Work in the Gendered Economy (Stanford University Press, 2020)
- 2022 Honorable Mention – Nozomi Naoi, Yumeji Modern: Designing the Everyday in Twentieth Century Japan (University of Washington Press, 2020)
- 2023 – Victor Seow, Carbon Technocracy: Energy Regimes in Modern East Asia (University of Chicago Press, 2021)
- 2023 Honorable Mention – Michael K. Bourdaghs, A Fictional Commons: Natsume Soseki and the Properties of Modern Literature (Duke University Press, 2021)
- 2023 Honorable Mention – Reginald Jackson, A Proximate Remove: Queering Intimacy and Loss in The Tale of Genji (University of California Press, 2021)
- 2024 – Sherzod Muminov, Eleven Winters of Discontent: The Siberian Internment and the Making of a New Japan (Harvard University Press, 2022)
- 2024 Honorable Mention – Morgan Pitelka, Reading Medieval Ruins: Urban Life and Destruction in Sixteenth-Century Japan (Cambridge University Press, 2022)
- 2025 - Anne Allison, Being Dead Otherwise (Duke University Press, 2023)
- 2025 Honorable Mention - Akiko Takeyama, Involuntary Consent: The Illusion of Choice in Japan’s Adult Video Industry (Stanford University Press, 2023)

== See also ==
- John K. Fairbank Prize
- James B. Palais Book Prize for Korean History.
