= Susan Hanley =

American Japanologist

Susan B. Hanley (born 1939) is an American academic, author, Japanologist and Professor Emerita of History at the University of Washington.

== Career ==
Hanley was a Professor of Japanese Studies and History at the University of Washington. Her primary area of academic research and writing is the material culture of Tokugawa society.

The Journal of Japanese Studies was edited by Hanley for more than a quarter of a century.

== Selected works ==
In a statistical overview derived from writings by and about Susan Hanley, OCLC/WorldCat encompasses roughly 10+ works in 20+ publications in 5 languages and 1,000+ library holdings.

- Population Trends and Economic Development in Tokugawa, Japan (1971)
- Population Trends and Economic Growth in Pre-Industrial Japan (1972)
- Toward an Analysis of Demographic and Economic Change in Tokugawa Japan : a Village Study (1972)
- Fertility, mortality and life expectancy in pre-modern Japan (1974)
- Economic and Demographic Change in Preindustrial Japan (1977)
- Family and population in East Asian History with Arthur P. Wolf (1985)
- Gender and Japanese History (ジェンダーの日本史, Jendā no Nihon shi) (1994)
- Everyday Things in Premodern Japan the Hidden Legacy of Material Culture (1997)

== Honors ==
- Association for Asian Studies, John Whitney Hall Book Prize, 1999.
