= Modern Japan History Association =

Scholarly non-profit professional association

- Abbreviation: MJHA
- Formation: 2023
- Type: Nonprofit professional association
- Legal status: 501(c)(3) organization
- Purpose: Promotion of scholarship on modern Japan and Japanese history
- Region served: International
- Members: Scholars of Japanese history and Japan studies
- Website: www.mjha.org

The Modern Japan History Association (MJHA) is a nonprofit professional association of scholars specializing in the study of modern Japan and Japanese history. The organization promotes research, teaching, and transnational scholarly exchange in the field of Japanese studies.

== History ==
The Modern Japan History Association was formally launched in 2023 as a professional organization serving scholars of modern Japan and Japanese history, complementing existing academic societies focused on earlier historical periods or broader regional studies.

The association emerged from a perceived need within the field for a dedicated network centered on modern and contemporary Japanese history, fostering collaboration among historians and scholars across disciplines and geographic regions.

== Mission and activities ==
MJHA’s stated mission is to support the creation and dissemination of knowledge about modern Japan and its history through scholarly exchange, collaboration, and recognition of outstanding research. MJHA's activities include organizing events such as lectures, roundtables, professional development workshops, and book talks; maintaining academic networks and listservs; and sponsoring prizes recognizing excellence in scholarship.

The association is a member-run organization without salaried staff and is supported by membership dues and donations.

== Prizes ==
The Modern Japan History Association administers several annual awards recognizing scholarship in Japanese studies, including:

- The Modern Japan History Association Book Prize
- The F. Hilary Conroy First Book Prize
- The Charlotte J. Conroy Dissertation Prize

These prizes recognize outstanding English-language monographs and doctoral dissertations on modern Japan or Japanese history across disciplines.

== Distinguished Annual Lecture ==
The Modern Japan History Association Distinguished Annual Lecture is the organization’s flagship annual event, recognizing the achievements and scholarly contributions of a leading historian of modern Japan. The lecturer is elected by the association’s membership, and each scholar may deliver the lecture only once.

The lecture is typically delivered online and is free to view. It serves as a major forum for reflection on the state of the field and new directions in the study of modern Japanese history.

=== List of MJHA Distinguished Annual Lecturers ===
Year	Lecturer	Affiliation	Lecture title
2023	Tessa Morris-Suzuki	Australian National University	Writing War: History in Occupied Japan and its Echoes for Today
2024	Carol Gluck	Columbia University	Thirteen Ways of Looking at Modern Japanese History: Time Past, Present, Future
2025	Andrew Gordon	Harvard University	After the Pandemic: Revising a Textbook and Rethinking History
2026	Jordan Sand	Georgetown University	The Stuff of Japanese History: Materialist Approaches

=== Overview ===
The lecture series was inaugurated in 2023 with historian Tessa Morris-Suzuki, whose lecture examined historiography and memory of the Asia-Pacific War in postwar Japan.

The second lecture, delivered in 2024 by Carol Gluck, addressed changing temporal frameworks and interpretations in modern Japanese history.

In 2025, Andrew Gordon delivered the third lecture, focusing on historiographical revision in light of the COVID-19 pandemic and evolving perspectives on modern Japan.

== Publications ==
Texts and recordings of the Distinguished Annual Lectures and other MJHA events are periodically made available through the association's website and on YouTube, contributing to broader dissemination of current scholarship in modern Japanese history.

== Recognition and coverage ==
MJHA prizes and activities have been reported by universities and research institutes in connection with awards to faculty and authors.

For example in 2025, the Harvard University Department of Anthropology and the Reischauer Institute of Japanese Studies noted that anthropologist Ryo Morimoto had received the association’s Book Prize for his book Nuclear Ghost.

Similarly, the Weatherhead East Asian Institute at Columbia University reported that Anri Yasuda received the 2026 F. Hilary Conroy First Book Prize for Beauty Matters, highlighting the association’s role in recognizing early-career scholarship.

University announcements have also noted finalists and nominees for MJHA prizes, reflecting the association’s growing visibility within the field of Japanese studies.
