= Suk-Young Kim =

South Korean historian

- Spouse: Michael Berry
- Children: 2
- Awards: James B. Palais Book Prize (2013); Guggenheim Fellowship (2025)

Academic background
- Education: Korea University; University of Illinois Chicago; Northwestern University
- Thesis: Syncretism in Nikolai Gogol's Ukrainian Stories (2001)

Academic work
- Sub-discipline: Korean cultural history
- Institutions: Dartmouth College; University of California, Santa Barbara; UCLA School of Theater, Film, and Television

Suk-Young Kim (Korean: 김숙영) is a South Korean academic based in the United States who specializes in Korean cultural history. She is a professor at UCLA School of Theater, Film and Television. She won the 2013 James B. Palais Book Prize for her book Illusive Utopia and is a 2025 Guggenheim Fellow.

== Biography ==
Raised in South Korea, Kim spent some time in Soviet Russia; the then-socialist nature of the country inspired her to study North Korean theatre. After obtaining her BA in Russian language and literature (1993) and MA in Russian literature (1995) from Korea University, she obtained two doctorates: one in Slavic languages and literature from the University of Illinois Chicago (2001) and a second one in interdisciplinary theatre and drama from Northwestern University (2005). Her doctoral dissertations were titled Syncretism in Nikolai Gogol's Ukrainian Stories and Revolutionizing the Family: A Comparative Study on the Filmed Propaganda Performances of the People’s Republic of China and the Democratic People’s Republic of Korea (1966-1976).

Kim spent one year as an assistant professor at Dartmouth College (2004–2005), moving out after one year. She began working at University of California, Santa Barbara in 2005, being promoted to associate professor in 2009 and full professor in 2013, She also serves as Associate Dean for Academic Affairs and External Engagement at UCLA, as well as Head of Theater and Performance Studies.

Kim specializes in Korean cultural history, both North and South. She co-created a memoir named Long Road Home with its author Kim Yong, released in 2012. She won the 2013 James B. Palais Book Prize for her 2010 book Illusive Utopia, as well as the 2015 ATHE Outstanding Book award for her book DMZ Crossing. She later authored K-Pop Live (2019), Surviving Squid Game (2023), and Millennial North Korea (2024). In 2025, she was awarded a Guggenheim Fellowship in Theatre Arts & Performance Studies. She is editor of The Cambridge Companion to K-Pop (2023), as well as co-editor for the Critical Voices from East Asia series from Columbia University Press.

Kim is part of the Hong Kong Research Grants Council. She was a judge at the 2023 MAMA Awards.

Kim is married to film scholar Michael Berry and they have two children. She also has a brother and sister.

== Bibliography ==
- Illusive Utopia (2010) (Note: Reviews of this book:)
- Long Road Home (2012) (Note: Reviews of this book:)
- DMZ Crossing (2014) (Note: Reviews of this book:)
- K-Pop Live (2018) (Note: Reviews of this book:)
- The Cambridge Companion to K-Pop (2023, as editor)
- Surviving Squid Game (2023)
- Millennial North Korea (2024) (Note: Reviews of this book:)
