= Harry J. Benda =

Czech-born American professor of Indonesian politics (1919–1971)

Harry Jindrich Benda (October 28, 1919 – October 26, 1971) was a Czech-born American full professor at Yale University. He specialised in Indonesian politics.

== Biography ==
Born to a Jewish family in Liberec, Czechoslovakia, he was sent to Java by his father to escape Nazism. He was the first director of the Institute for Southeast Asian Studies in Singapore.

The Association for Asian Studies' prize for first book in Southeast Asian studies is named in his honour.

Benda emigrated to the United States, becoming a naturalised citizen in 1960. He died in New Haven, Connecticut on October 26, 1971, at the age of 51.

== Books ==
- Benda, Harry J. The Crescent and the Rising Sun: Indonesian Islam Under the Japanese Occupation, 1942–1945. Dordrecht [etc.: Foris Publications, 1983. ISBN 9789067650496.'
- Benda, Harry J. Japanese Military Administration in Indonesia. New Haven: Yale University Southeast Studies, 1965
- Benda, Harry J, and John A. Larkin. The World of Southeast Asia: Selected Historical Readings. New York: Harper & Row, 1967 OCLC 610671749
- Benda, Harry J, and Ruth T. McVey. The Communist Uprisings of 1926–1927 in Indonesia: Key Documents. Jakarta: Equinox Pub, 2009. ISBN 9786028397254
- Bastin, John, and Harry J. Benda. A History of Modern Southeast Asia: Colonialism, Nationalism, and Decolonization. Sydney : Prentice-Hall of Australia, 1977. ISBN 9780724805532
- Benda, Harry J. Peasant Movements in Colonial Southeast Asia. New Haven, Conn: Yale University, Southeast Asia Studies, 1966.
- Benda, Harry J, and Adrienne Suddard. Continuity and Change in Southeast Asia: Collected Journal Articles of Harry J. Benda. New Haven: Yale Univ. Southeast Asia Studies, 1972
- Benda, Harry J. Continuity and Change in Indonesian Islam. New Haven, Conn: Yale University, Southeast Asia Studies, 1965
  - translated into Indonesian by Taufik Abdullah. as Islam Di Indonesia: Sepintas Lalu Tentang Beberapa Segi. Jakarta: Tintamas, 1974.
- McVey, Ruth T, Adrienne Suddard, and Harry J. Benda. Southeast Asian Transitions: Approaches Through Social History. New Haven: Yale University Press, 1978.
- Benda, Harry J. The Samin Movement. New Haven: Connecticut, 1969
