= William Tsutsui =

American historian

22nd President of Ottawa University
- Incumbent
- Assumed office July 1, 2021
- Preceded by: Kevin Eichner

11th President of Hendrix College
- In office 2014–2019
- Preceded by: J. Timothy Cloyd
- Succeeded by: Ellis Arnold III

Personal details
- Born: William M. Tsutsui; July 9, 1963 (age 63) New York City, New York, U.S.
- Spouse: Marjorie Swann
- Education: Harvard University; Princeton University
- Website: Bill Tsutsui Personal Website

William M. Tsutsui is an American academic, author, economic historian, Japanologist, university administrator, and Godzilla expert. He was named President and CEO of Ottawa University, May 3, 2021, and took office July 1, 2021.

== Early life ==
Tsutsui was born in New York City and grew up in Bryan, Texas. Tsutsui earned his undergraduate degree summa cum laude from Harvard University. In 1985, he was awarded an A.B. degree in East Asian Studies. Tsutsui earned his Ph.D. in history at Princeton University in 1995. In 1988, Oxford University’s Corpus Christi College, where he was a Marshall Scholar, awarded him a Master of Letters in Modern Japanese History. In 1990, Princeton awarded him an M.A. in history. In 1991-1992, he was a visiting research scholar at Hitotsubashi University in Tokyo before returning to Princeton to complete his doctoral dissertation.

== Career ==
Tsutsui served as Dean of Dedman College of Humanities and Sciences at Southern Methodist University in Dallas, Texas from 2010 to 2014. He was also Professor in SMU's Clements Department of History. Previously, he had been a faculty member in the History Department at the University of Kansas from 1993 through 2010. At Kansas he served as Acting Director of the Center for East Asian Studies, Founding Executive Director of the Confucius Institute at the University of Kansas, Chair of the History Department, and Associate Dean for International Studies in the College of Liberal Arts and Sciences.

Tsutsui served as president of the Kansas State Historical Society in 2003-2004 and was a member of the board of directors of the Kansas Humanities Council from 2000 to 2006. He chaired the Northeast Asia Council of the Association for Asian Studies and served on the board of the Association for Asian Studies in 2010-2011. He has served on the boards of directors of the World Affairs Council of Dallas-Fort Worth, the Conway (AR) Area Chamber of Commerce, EIIA, and the Arkansas Repertory Theatre, and was a member of the National Advisory Committee of the Japan-America Student Conference and the NCAA Division III Presidents Council. He current serves on the boards of the Federation of State Humanities Councils, the Association for Asian Studies, and the U.S.-Japan Council. In May 2020, he was appointed to the Japan-United States Friendship Commission and The U.S.-Japan Conference on Cultural and Educational Interchange (CULCON).

In 2020-2021, Tsutsui was the Edwin O. Reischauer Distinguished Visiting Professor at Harvard University, where he was affiliated with the Edwin O. Reischauer Institute of Japanese Studies and the Department of East Asian Languages & Civilizations. On July 1, 2021, Tsutsui began as President and CEO of Ottawa University, a comprehensive, not-for-profit educational institution, serving more than 4,000 students through its residential campuses in Ottawa, Kansas, and Surprise, Arizona, and adult campuses in Overland Park, Kansas; Phoenix, Arizona; Brookfield, Wisconsin; and online.

== President of Hendrix College ==
On November 1, 2013, Hendrix College announced that Tsutsui would become its 11th president beginning in June 2014. Tsutsui's move into the Hendrix College presidency marked a new turn in his career as a scholar and administrator. While he had previously served in positions at a large state university (University of Kansas) and church-affiliated private university (Southern Methodist University), he had never before held a position in a small liberal arts college.

Upon the announcement of his selection as the Hendrix president, Tsutsui commented, “I am deeply honored for the opportunity to serve as President of Hendrix." He went on, "Today, despite the challenges faced by all liberal arts colleges, Hendrix holds an enviable position ... I firmly believe that Hendrix is well prepared for the challenges ahead and I look forward to working with the trustees, faculty, staff, and students to make a real contribution to Hendrix’s future.”

== Selected works ==
In a statistical overview derived from writings by and about William Tsutsui, OCLC/WorldCat encompasses roughly 20+ works in 40+ publications in 2 languages and 1,000+ library holdings.

- Stabilization and Reconstruction in Japan, 1945-1950 (undergraduate honors thesis, 1985)
- Banking policy in Japan: American Efforts at Reform during the Occupation (1988)
- From Taylorism to Quality Control: Scientific Management in Twentieth-Century Japan (PhD dissertation, 1995)
- Manufacturing Ideology: Scientific Management in Twentieth-Century Japan (1998)
- Banking in Japan: The Evolution of Japanese Banking, 1868-1952 (1999)
- Japanese Banking in the High-Growth Era, 1952-1973 (1999)
- Japanese Banking Since 1973: Deregulation, Internationalization and Adjustment (1999)
- Godzilla on my Mind: Fifty Years of the King of Monsters (2004); Japanese translation: Gojira to Amerika no hanseiki (ゴジラとアメリカの半世紀) with Kyōko Kamiyama (2005)
- A Companion to Japanese History (2006)
- In Godzilla's Footsteps: Japanese Pop Culture Icons on the Global Stage co-edited with Michiko Ito (2006)
- Japanese Popular Culture and Globalization (2010)
- The East Asian Olympiads: Building Bodies and Nations in Japan, Korea, and China co-edited with Michael Baskett (2011)

== Honors ==
- Bridges to Friendship Award, Japan America Society of Greater Austin (Texas), 2015
- George and Eleanor Woodyard International Educator Award, University of Kansas, 2007
- William Rockhill Nelson Award (non-fiction), 2005
- W.T. Kemper Fellowship for Teaching Excellence, University of Kansas, 2001
- Association for Asian Studies, John Whitney Hall Book Prize, 2000.
- Fulbright Graduate Research Fellowship, 1991-1992
- Foreign Language Area Studies (FLAS) Fellowship, 1988-1991
- Marshall Scholarship, 1985-1987
