= Sabine Frühstück =

Scholar Japanese cultural studies

- Occupation: Professor of Japanese Studies

Academic background
- Education: University of Vienna (MA, PhD)

Academic work
- Discipline: Japanese studies, History, Gender studies, Sociology of science, Childhood studies
- Institutions: University of California, Santa Barbara

Sabine Frühstück is an Austrian-born Japanologist specializing in Japanese cultural studies. She is Distinguished Professor and Koichi Takashima Chair in Japanese Cultural Studies in the Department of East Asian Languages and Cultural Studies at the University of California, Santa Barbara (UCSB). Her research focuses on modern and contemporary Japan, with particular emphasis on gender, sexuality, militarism, childhood, aging society, and the body.

She is co-editor of the Journal of Japanese Studies and editor of the University of California Press book series New Interventions in Japanese Studies.

== Academic Career ==
After receiving schooling in St. Veit an der Glan, Frühstück completed her MA (1992) and PhD (1996) at the University of Vienna, studying under Sepp Linhart and Helga Nowotny.

After three years as a research assistant at the Institute for East Asian Studies, Frühstück joined the faculty of the University of California, Santa Barbara in 1999 as an assistant professor in the Department of East Asian Languages and Cultural Studies, was promoted to associate professor in 2002, and to full professor in 2006. She has held affiliated appointments in the departments of History, Anthropology, Feminist Studies, and Global Studies at UCSB.

Frühstück has served as director of UCSB’s East Asia Center (2003–2009; 2016–2019; 2025–present), where she has promoted interdisciplinary and transnational approaches to the study of East Asia.

== Scholarship ==
Frühstück’s scholarship examines modern and contemporary Japanese culture through interdisciplinary approaches combining history, sociology, ethnography, gender studies, and cultural analysis. Her research interests include gender and sexuality, militarism, violence, childhood, and the body in modern Japan.

Her first monograph, Colonizing Sex: Sexology and Social Control in Modern Japan (2003), explored the development of sexology in modern Japan and its relationship to state power, social control, and empire.

Her second major monograph, Uneasy Warriors: Gender, Memory, and Popular Culture in the Japanese Army (2007), analyzes the cultural and social positioning of Japan’s Self-Defense Forces in the postwar period in relationship to militarism and ideals of masculinity, drawing on ethnographic research and cultural analysis.

In Playing War: Children and the Paradoxes of Modern Militarism in Japan (2017), she explores how childhood was mobilized in modern Japan to both sustain and later critique militarism.

A fourth monograph, Gender and Sexuality in Modern Japan (2022), traces changing configurations of sex, gender, and identity in Japan from the nineteenth century to the present.

== Selected bibliography ==
=== Books ===
- Frühstück, Sabine (2003). Colonizing Sex: Sexology and Social Control in Modern Japan. Berkeley: University of California Press. ISBN 9780520235489.
- Frühstück, Sabine (2007). Uneasy Warriors: Gender, Memory, and Popular Culture in the Japanese Army. Berkeley: University of California Press. ISBN 9780520247956.
- Frühstück, Sabine (2017). Playing War: Children and the Paradoxes of Modern Militarism in Japan. Oakland: University of California Press. ISBN 9780520295452.
- Frühstück, Sabine (2022). Gender and Sexuality in Modern Japan. Cambridge: Cambridge University Press. ISBN 9781108420655.

=== Edited volumes ===
- Linhart, Sepp; Frühstück, Sabine (1998). The Culture of Japan as Seen through Its Leisure. New York: State University of New York Press. ISBN 9780791437919.
- Frühstück, Sabine; Walthall, Anne (2011). Recreating Japanese Men. Berkeley: University of California Press. ISBN 9780520950320.
- Frühstück, Sabine; Walthall, Anne (2017). Child’s Play: Multi-Sensory Histories of Children and Childhood in Japan. Oakland: University of California Press. ISBN 9780520296275.
