= Sem Vermeersch =

Belgian Koreanist (born 1968)

Sem Andre Claudine Vermeersch (born 1968 in Blankenberge) is a Belgian academician, editor, author, administrator and professor of Buddhism at Seoul National University.

== Early life ==
Vermeersch's undergraduate experience at the University of Ghent was followed by further studies at Anhui Normal University in China. In 1992, Vermeersch studied Korean at the Jungsin Cultural Research Center (now The Academy of Korean Studies) in Seoul. His PhD was conferred by the School of Oriental and African Studies (SOAS) at the University of London. His 2001 doctoral thesis was entitled "The Power of Buddha."

== Career ==
Vermeersch was a postdoctoral research associate at the Korea Institute, Harvard University (2002- 2003), a visiting professor at the Academia Koreana, Keimyung University (2005-2007), and in 2008 joined the faculty of Seoul National University as a fellow at the Kyujanggak Institute for Korean Studies. In 2008, he also became associate director at the Center for Korean Studies and editor of the Seoul Journal of Korean Studies (SJKS).

== Selected works ==
In a statistical overview derived from writings by and about Sem Vermeersch, OCLC/WorldCat encompasses roughly 3 works in 6 publications in 3 languages and 200+ library holdings.

- The Power of Buddha: the Ideological and Institutional Role of Buddhism in the Koryo Dynasty, 2001
- 湖巌承志園: 우리 시대 의 한옥, 호암 승지원 (Hoam Sŭngjiwŏn : uri sidae ŭi hanok, Hoam Sŭngjiwŏn), 2006
- The Power of the Buddhas: the Politics of Buddhism During the Koryŏ Dynasty (918-1392), 2008
- "A Chinese Traveler in Medieval Korea: Xu Jing's Illustrated Account of the Xuanhe Embassy to Koryo", 2016

== Honors ==
- Association for Asian Studies, James B. Palais Book Prize, 2010.
