= Kenneth A. Oye =

Kenneth Akito Oye (born October 20, 1949) is an American political scientist. He is a professor of political science (School of Humanities, Arts and Social Sciences) and Data Systems and Society (School of Engineering) at the Massachusetts Institute of Technology. He is director of the MIT Program on Emerging Technologies and former director of the MIT Center for International Studies.

== Life ==
Oye graduated from Swarthmore College and from Harvard University with a Ph.D. in political science. He is best known for publications on Regime theory and International Political Economy. His current research focuses on planned adaptation in the face of pervasive uncertainty, with applications in emerging technologies.

In 2018, Oye received the Order of the Rising Sun, Gold Rays with Rosette for his contributions to "promoting understanding of Japan in the United States."

Oye currently teaches at the Massachusetts Institute of Technology. He is a member of the Council on Foreign Relations and a Trustee of the World Peace Foundation.

== Works ==
- "Regulate 'home-brew' opiates." Oye et al. Nature. 521.7552 (2015): 281–283.
- "Regulating gene drives." Oye et al. Science. 345.6197 (2014): 626–628.
- “Embracing Uncertainty,” Kenneth A. Oye, Issues in Science and Technology, Vol XXVI, No 1, Fall 2009, pp 91–93.
- Economic Discrimination and Political Exchange: World Political Economy in the 1930s and 1980s. Princeton University Press. 1993. ISBN 9780691000831.
- Cooperation Under Anarchy. Princeton University Press. 1986. ISBN 9780691022406.

Edited with Robert Lieber and Donald Rothchild:

- Eagle in a New World: American Grand Strategy in the Post Cold War Era. HarperCollins. 1992.
- Eagle Resurgent? The Reagan Era in United States Foreign Policy. Little Brown and Co. 1987.
- Eagle Defiant: United States Foreign Policy in the 1980s. Little Brown and Co. 1983.
- Eagle Entangled: U.S. Foreign Policy in a Complex World. Longman. 1979.
