= Andrew Gordon (historian) =

American historian

- Occupation: Historian

Academic background
- Education: Harvard University (PhD)

Academic work
- Discipline: History
- Sub-discipline: History of Japan
- Institutions: Duke University; Harvard University
- Notable works: A Modern History of Japan: From Tokugawa Times to the Present

Andrew Gordon is an American Japanologist who is a scholar of modern Japanese history. He is a Lee and Juliet Folger Fund Professor of History at Harvard University and former chair of the Department of History there from 2004 to 2007. He was Director of the Edwin O. Reischauer Institute of Japanese Studies from 1998 through 2004 and again from 2010 through 2011. From 2016 to 2017, Gordon was the acting director of the Harvard University Asia Center. Additionally, as of 2020, he was the director of the Japan Disasters Digital Archive, a catalog and search engine for archived digital material relating to the 2011 Tōhoku earthquake and tsunami.

Gordon completed his PhD in History and East Asian Languages at Harvard University in 1981. Following the completion of his graduate studies he has taught history at both Duke University and at Harvard. He is one of the leading experts on Japanese labor history but has lately shifted to other fields. Gordon's 2003 A Modern History of Japan is now one of the standard textbooks on the topic and has been translated into Japanese. A revised edition of the work was released in 2009. Gordon has more recently been engaged in research on the history of the sewing machine and the making of the modern consumer in 20th century Japan.

In October 2020, the National Institutes for the Humanities of Japan (NIHU) awarded Gordon the 2020 International Prize for Japanese Studies.

== Honors ==
- 2025 – Distinguished Annual Lecturer, Modern Japan History Association
- 2020 – National Institute of Humanities International Prize in Japanese Studies
- 2014 – elected to the American Academy of Arts and Sciences
- 1992 – John King Fairbank Prize for Labor and Imperial Democracy in Prewar Japan

== Selected works ==
In a statistical overview derived from writings by and about Andrew Gordon, OCLC/WorldCat encompasses roughly 30 works in 90+ publications in five languages and 6,000+ library holdings.

- A Modern History of Japan: From Tokugawa Times to the Present (Fourth Edition). (2019)
- Fabricating Consumers: The Sewing Machine in Modern Japan. (2011)
- Nihonjin ga shiranai Matsuzaka mejaa kakumei (Matsuzaka's Unknown Major League Revolution) Asahi shinsho (2007)
- A Modern History of Japan: From Tokugawa Times to the Present. (2003)
- The Wages of Affluence: Labor and Management in Postwar Japan. (1998)
- Postwar Japan as History (ed). (1993) ISBN 0-520-07475-0.
- Labor and Imperial Democracy in Prewar Japan. (1992)
- The Evolution of Labor Relations in Japan: Heavy Industry, 1853–1955. (1985) ISBN 0-674-27130-0.
