= Jordan Sand =

American Japanologist

- Occupation: Historian
- Awards: Modern Japan History Association Distinguished Annual Lecturer (2026); Guggenheim Fellowship (2022); John Whitney Hall Book Prize (2005); Alice Davis Hitchcock Award (2005); John K. Fairbank Prize (2004)

Academic background
- Education: Columbia University (BA, PhD); University of Tokyo (ME)

Academic work
- Discipline: History
- Sub-discipline: History of Japan
- Institutions: Georgetown University; Waseda University
- Notable works: House and Home in Modern Japan (2004) Tokyo Vernacular: Common Spaces, Local Histories, Found Objects (2013)

Jordan Sand is an American Japanologist. He is a professor of Japanese history and culture at Georgetown University with a focus on the architectural and cultural history of Japan.

== Biography ==
Sand received his B.A. and Ph.D. from Columbia University, and a M.E. from the University of Tokyo in architectural history. His specialization is the urban and architectural history of Japan. He is also an affiliated researcher at Waseda University.

His book, House and Home in Modern Japan (2004), received the 2005 John Whitney Hall Book Prize, 2005 Alice Davis Hitchcock Award, and the 2004 John K. Fairbank Prize.

Sand received a Guggenheim Fellowship in 2022 to finish writing a book about the Ise Grand Shrine. In 2026, Sand was selected as Distinguished Annual Lecturer by the Modern Japan History Association.
