= Prerna Singh =

Political scientist

Prerna Singh is a political scientist specializing in comparative politics, development, public health, ethnicity, and nationalism. She is the Mahatma Gandhi Associate Professor of Political Science and International Studies at Brown University's Watson Institute for International and Public Affairs.

== Education ==
Singh earned a B.A. in Economics from St. Stephen's College at Delhi University and another B.A. in Social and Political Sciences from the University of Cambridge. Subsequently, she obtained a Ph.D. in Politics from Princeton University.

== Career ==
After an assistant professorship in the Department of Government at Harvard University, Singh took up the posts of Mahatma Gandhi Assistant and then Associate Professor of Political Science and International Studies at Brown University.

In 2019, Singh was elected a Fellow of the American Academy in Berlin. A year later, she received a fellowship in the Center for Advanced Study in the Behavioral Sciences at Stanford University.

== Research ==
Singh is an expert in human wellbeing, social welfare, and ethnic conflict. Her first book, How solidarity works for welfare: Subnationalism and social development in India, was published in 2015 by Cambridge University Press.

== Awards ==
- Woodrow Wilson Foundation Award, American Political Science Association (APSA)
- Barrington Moore Book Award, American Sociological Association (ASA)
