= Paul J. Heer =

American historian

- Education: George Washington University (PhD); University of Iowa (MA); Loras College (BA)
- Occupations: Diplomatic historian, East Asia analyst, former CIA officer
- Employer(s): Chicago Council on Global Affairs, Elliott School of International Affairs

Paul J. Heer (born 1959) is an American diplomatic historian and intelligence analyst who served as National Intelligence Officer for East Asia at the National Intelligence Council in ODNI from 2007 to 2015. Heer is currently an adjunct professor at George Washington University's Elliott School of International Affairs and a nonresident senior fellow at the Chicago Council on Global Affairs.

Beyond his work in government, Heer has also made significant contributions to the study of U.S.–China relations and East Asian foreign policy. His research combines his experience as an intelligence analyst with his background as a diplomatic historian, allowing him to examine both contemporary security issues and their historical context. He is particularly interested in how the United States understands China and how American foreign-policy decisions can shape relations in East Asia. His book, Mr. X and the Pacific: George F. Kennan and American Policy in East Asia, explores George Kennan’s views on East Asia and highlights the importance of understanding the historical development of American foreign policy. Through his academic and policy work, Heer has become an important voice in discussions about China, Taiwan, and the future of U.S. relations with East Asia.

== Education and CIA career ==
Heer holds a BA in history from Loras College and a MA in history (1982) from the University of Iowa.

Heer joined the CIA after completing graduate school, and while working there, he pursued a PhD in diplomatic history focused on George F. Kennan's role in formulating US policy toward East Asia during the early years of the Cold War at George Washington University.

Between 1999 and 2000, Heer was a visiting intelligence fellow at the Council on Foreign Relations. He was elected a CFR life member in 2001.

On May 16, 2007, Heer was appointed the National Intelligence Officer for East Asia at the National Intelligence Council, a position he served until he retired from the CIA in 2015. He received CIA's Distinguished Career Intelligence Medal and DNI's National Intelligence Distinguished Service Medal.

He also completed executive education programs at the Harvard Kennedy School and Northwestern University.

== Post-CIA career ==
Heer joined MIT's Center for International Studies as a Robert E. Wilhelm fellow between September 2015 and 2016. He has also been appointed a distinguished fellow at Center for the National Interest.

== Publications ==
=== Books ===
- Mr. X and the Pacific: George F. Kennan and American Policy in East Asia, Cornell University Press, 2018

=== Articles ===
- A Possible Partner (in What Does America Want From China?), Foreign Affairs, May 30, 2024
- Hostility Between the United States and China Looks Increasingly Inescapable, National Interest, September 25, 2023
- The Overreach of the China Hawks, Foreign Affairs, October 23, 2020 (co-authored with Michael D. Swaine, Ezra F. Vogel, J. Stapleton Roy, Rachel Esplin Odell, Mike Mochizuki, Avery Goldstein, and Alice Miller)
- Are Chinese and American Interests Mutually Exclusive in Eurasia? Orbis, July 2, 2020
- A House United, Foreign Affairs, July 1, 2000
