= Tessa Morris-Suzuki =

Australian historian (born 1951)

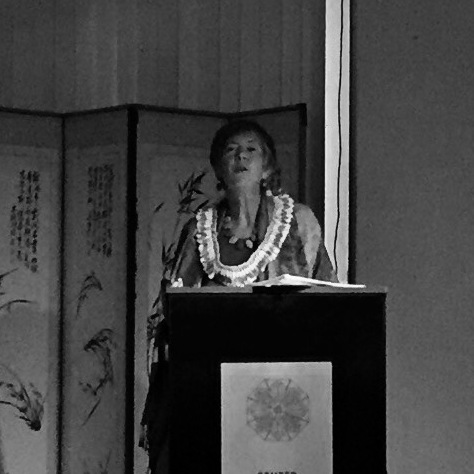
- at the Center for Korean Studies in 2016
- Born: Teresa Irene Jessica Morris; October 29, 1951 (age 74); Caterham, Surrey, England
- Education: University of Bristol (B.A); University of Bath (Ph.D.)
- Occupation: Historian
- Employer: Australian National University

Tessa Morris-Suzuki FAHA (born 29 October 1951 in Caterham, Surrey, England), born Teresa Irene Jessica Morris, is an Australian historian of modern Japan and North Korea. She is a Professor Emerita in the School of Culture, History and Language, College of Asia and the Pacific, the Australian National University. She served as president of the Asian Studies Association of Australia from 2002-2003.

== Early life ==
Born in Caterham, Surrey, England, she obtained her B.A. in Russian history from University of Bristol in 1972, and received a Ph.D. in the economic history of Japan from the University of Bath in 1980, completing a thesis on Japan's relations with Indonesia. In 1981, she moved to Australia where she taught at the University of New England prior to accepting a post at the Australian National University in 1992. Tessa Morris married to the Japanese writer Hiroshi Suzuki and incorporated her husband's surname into her double surname. In turn, her husband incorporated her surname into his pen name as Morisu Hiroshi.

== Academic career ==
Her research focuses on Japan's frontiers and minority communities and on questions of historical memory in East Asia. She is the author of Exodus to North Korea: Shadows from Japan's Cold War. Two of her books are To the Diamond Mountains: A Hundred Year Journey Through China and Korea, and Borderline Japan: Foreigners and Frontier Controls in the Post-war Era. In 2024 she published a biography of Monte Punshon who "came out", joined MENSA and gained a medal from Japan after the age of 100.

== Awards and honours ==
Morris-Suzuki was elected a Fellow of the Australian Academy of the Humanities in 1994.

In 2012, she was awarded an Australian Laureate Fellowship.

In 2013, she was the winner of the Academic Prize of the Fukuoka Asian Culture Prize.

In 2023, Morris-Suzuki was awarded the Distinguished Annual Lectureship by the Modern Japan History Association, presenting a lecture titled "Writing War: History in Occupied Japan and its Echoes for Today."

== Publications ==
- Beyond Computopia: Information, Automation and Democracy in Japan, Kegan Paul International, 1988.
- History of Japanese Economic Thought, Routledge, 1992.
- The Technological Transformation of Japan, Cambridge University Press, 1994. (also published in Chinese and Korean translations)
- Re-Inventing Japan: Time Space, Nation, M. E. Sharpe, 1998. (also published in Spanish translation)
- Demokurashii no Bôken (Ventures in Democracy, co-authored), Shûeisha, 2004.
- The Past Within Us: Media, Memory, History, Verso, 2005. (also published in Japanese translation)
- Exodus to North Korea: Shadows from Japan's Cold War, Rowman and Littlefield, 2007. (also published in Japanese translation)
- 天皇とアメリカ (Tennô to Amerika, The Emperor and America, coauthored), Shûeisha, 2010
- To the Diamond Mountains: A Hundred Year Journey Through China and Korea, Rowman and Littlefield, 2010
- Borderline Japan: Foreigners and Frontier Controls in the Postwar Era, Cambridge University Press, 2010
- A Secretive Century: Monte Punshon’s Australia, 2024
