= Earl H. Pritchard =

American academic (1907–1995)

- Born: June 5, 1907
- Died: May 9, 1995 (aged 87)

Earl Hampton Pritchard (June 5, 1907 – May 9, 1995) was an American scholar of China and one of the founders of the Association for Asian Studies and served as its president.

Pritchard was born on June 5, 1907, in Pullman, Washington, where he spent his childhood on the farm of his father, Thomas Pritchard. He attended Washington State College and graduated with his B.A. in 1928. He then attended the University of Illinois at Urbana-Champaign where completed his M.A. in 1929. Returning to Pullman in 1930, he applied for a Rhodes Scholarship and became the second student from Washington State College to win the scholarship. He spent three years at the University of Oxford and was awarded his PhD in history in 1933.

After completing his doctoral dissertation, Pritchard taught at Reed College in Portland, Oregon, from 1934 until transferring to Washington State in 1935, where he stayed until 1937. He studied Chinese at Columbia University and the University of Michigan between 1937 and 1939, but he later regretted that his Chinese did not reach the level of proficiency he felt any serious student of China should be.

Pritchard taught at Wayne State University in Detroit between 1939 and 1947. This stint was interrupted from 1942 to 1945 when he was a civilian analyst with military intelligence during the Second World War. He was in charge of a 15–20 person group that studied Japanese transportation networks in China and Japan. He was the first recipient of the War Department's highest award for intelligence service, the Distinguished Civilian Service Medal. After the end of the war, he was an associate professor of history at the University of Chicago from 1947 until 1962. He was disappointed when the Fulbright Fellowship that he earned in 1948 to go to China was cancelled because of the Communist revolution led by Mao Zedong that was sweeping away the nationalist forces of Chiang Kai-shek at the time. Pritchard never had an opportunity to visit the country he researched and taught about for most of his life, although he did travel to Japan in 1957. He moved to Tucson in Arizona to assume the chair of the Oriental Studies Department at the University of Arizona. He significantly built up the program until his retirement in 1972. He taught for several more years as professor emeritus.

Pritchard was the founder and editor of the Bulletin of Far Eastern Bibliography, which became the Far Eastern Quarterly before assuming its present form as the Journal of Asian Studies. He was one of the founders of the Far Eastern Association, which later became the Association for Asian Studies. Se served as the president from 1962 to 1963, vice president from 1961 to 1962, was a director in 1948–51, 1952–55, and 1961–64.

He cited the major achievements of his career as the foundation of what was to become the Association for Asian Studies and the Journal of Asian Studies, and secondly the growth of oriental studies at the University of Arizona. He cited as his third most important achievement the publication of Anglo-Chinese Relations During the Seventeenth and Eighteenth Centuries (a compacted version of his M.A. thesis), The Crucial Years of Early Anglo-Chinese Relations 1750–1800 (based in part on his doctoral thesis, 1936), sections written for The American Historical Association's Guide to Historical Literature (1961), the coauthoring of Volume 4 of the UNESCO History of Mankind: Cultural and Scientific Development.

He died on May 9, 1995, in Tucson at the age of 87.
