= Hala Al-Dosari =

Saudi women's activist

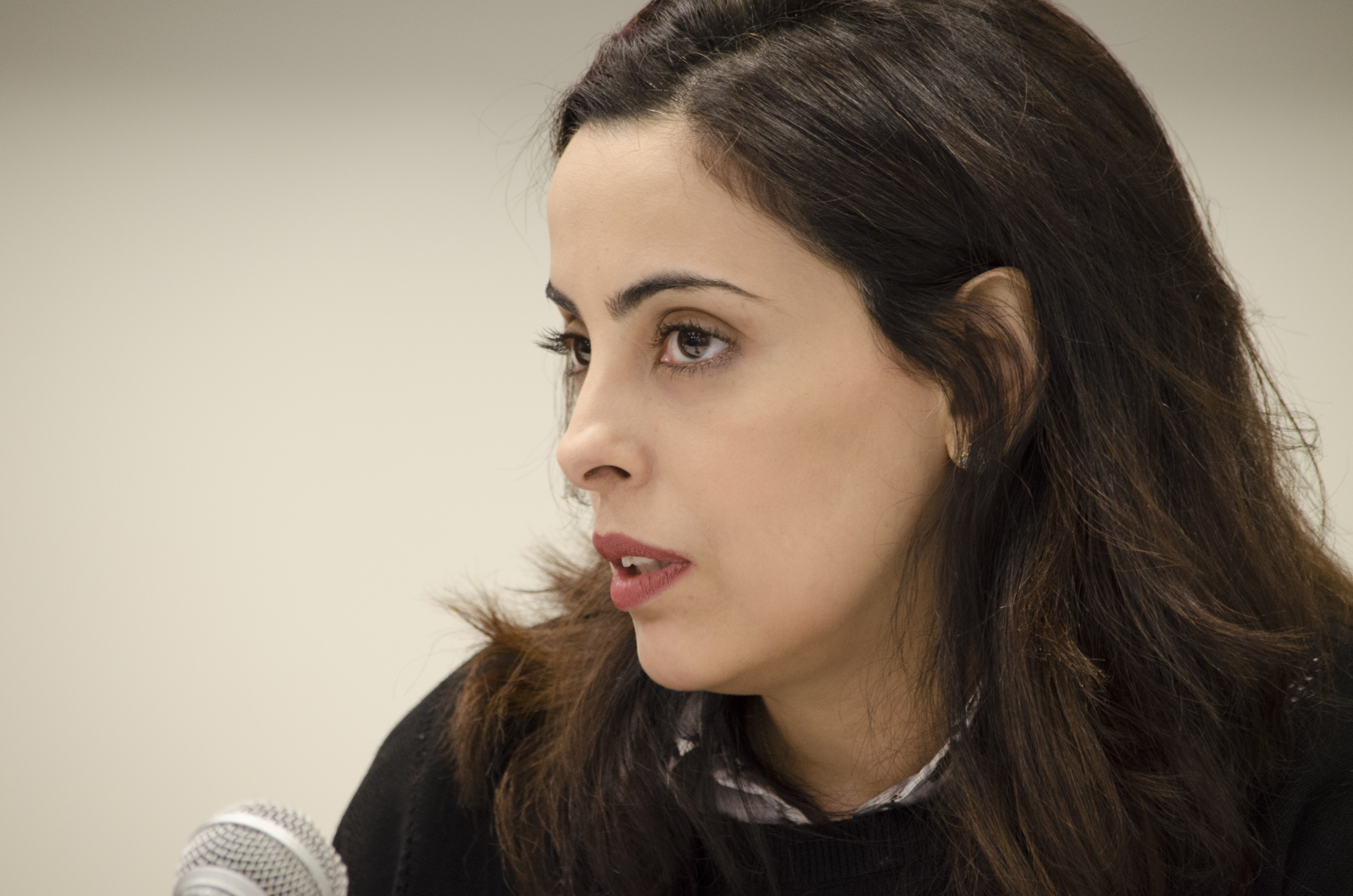
- Hala Al-Dosari, 2018
- Occupation: Saudi women's activist

Hala Al-Dosari is a Saudi women's activist. A fellow of the Radcliffe Institute at Harvard University, she was awarded the Alison Des Forges Award for Extraordinary Activism by Human Rights Watch in 2018.
