= Lucian Pye =

American sinologist (1921–2008)

- Born: Lucian W. Pye; October 21, 1921; Fenzhou, China
- Died: September 5, 2008 (aged 86); Boston, Massachusetts, U.S.

Academic background
- Education: Carleton College; Yale University
- Influences: Gabriel Almond

Academic work
- Institutions: Massachusetts Institute of Technology
- Notable ideas: Political culture, political psychology

Lucian W. Pye (Chinese: 白魯恂; pinyin: Bái Lǔxún; October 21, 1921 – September 5, 2008) was an American political scientist, sinologist and comparative politics expert.

Pye focused on the characteristics of specific cultures in forming theories of political development of modernization of Third World nations, rather than seeking universal and overarching theories like most political scientists. As a result, he became regarded as one of the foremost contemporary practitioners and proponents of the concept of political culture and political psychology. Pye was a teacher at the Massachusetts Institute of Technology for 35 years and served on several Asia-related research and policy organizations. He wrote or edited books and served as advisor to Democratic presidential candidates, including John F. Kennedy. Pye died of pneumonia at age 86.

== Early life and education ==
Lucian W. Pye was born on October 21, 1921, in Fenzhou, in Shanxi Province in northwest China. His father, Watts O. Pye, a graduate of Carleton College, and his mother, Gertrude Chaney Pye, were Congregational missionaries of the American Board of Commissioners for Foreign Missions. When his father died in 1926, he and his mother stayed in Fenzhou until he moved to Oberlin, Ohio, for high school. Pye lost much of his grasp of the Chinese language upon moving to Ohio, only to take it up again later. Pye graduated in 1943 from Carleton College, where he met Mary Toombs Waddill, of Greenville, South Carolina; they married in 1945, and she would co-write and help edit many of his books and writings over the years.

Pye returned to China at the end of World War II to become an intelligence officer with the U.S. Marines Corps, achieving the rank of second lieutenant. He returned to the United States to attend graduate school through the G.I. Bill at Yale University, where he was introduced to comparative politics by his mentor, political scientist Gabriel Almond. Almond later said Pye "generally (left) me a little breathless; he had so much energy and enthusiasm." During his time at Yale, Pye worked with other notable political scientists like Almond, Harold Lasswell and Nathan Leites in exploring the psychological, sociological, and anthropological elements of international affairs, rather than applying the orthodox "realism" approach. Pye wrote his dissertation on the attitudes underlying the warlord system of politics in China during the 1920s and earned his Ph.D. in 1951.

== Career ==
Early in his career, Pye worked with other political scientists to free the field from academic constraints placed upon them by the era of Senator Joseph McCarthy. In 1956, Pye joined the Massachusetts Institute of Technology Center for International Studies as a teacher in a new program, which eventually developed into a political science department, partially due to Pye's assistance. He taught political science at the M.I.T. for 35 years, particularly focusing on China and other Asian nations. M.I.T. officials said he was one of only a few scholars who studied Asian politics from a comparative standpoint, and he served as a mentor to several generations of students who went on to prominent positions in academia and government. Among his Ph.D. graduate students were Richard H. Solomon and Susan Shirk, both of whom were political scientists who served in the United States government, and Richard Samuels. Pye helped found the Committee on Comparatives Politics for the Social Science Research Council, along with other social scientists seeking alternative explanations for change than those offered by Marxism.

Pye became one of the pioneers in the 1950s and 1960s in developing theories about the political development and modernization of Third World nations. His primary intellectual interest was to explore the cultural differences that help explain why politics differ so greatly from one nation to another. Unlike most political scientists of his day who sought universal and overarching theories, Pye focused on specific cultures, countries and people in order to create more individualized interpretations. Richard Samuels, an M.I.T. political scientist who worked with Pye, said he helped foster a new manner of thinking in post-World War II social science by "redirected political science away from rational models of political behavior and toward things that are harder to measure and understand." His daughter later recalled that he once said, "only half in jest," that "political scientists are all failed novelists," meaning that "academics shared with artists the impulse to tell a story, but that statistics, studies and even firsthand fact-finding alone made an incomplete picture." Pye's approach was so novel that it often drew opposite reactions and criticism, but he nevertheless came to be considered a peer of the Chinese experts of his generation, like John K. Fairbank of Harvard.

Pye advised the Department of State and the National Security Council in China-related matters. He also served as an advisor to Democratic presidential candidates, Senators John F. Kennedy and Henry M. Jackson, and urged both men to pursue a muscular foreign policy. He was an early proponent of the Vietnam War. Pye served as a leader, and eventually acting chairman, with the National Committee on United States-China Relations, where he helped lay the groundwork for the American table tennis team visit to China in 1971. Pye served on several private organizations in which scholars, government experts and intellectuals discussed Asia-related research and policy, including the Council on Foreign Relations, the Asia Society and the Asia Foundation. He was elected to the American Academy of Arts and Sciences in 1962 and the American Philosophical Society in 1976.

Pye supported the Social Science Research Council in the establishment of the Universities Service Center, a scholarly center in Hong Kong. He also conducted research in Malaysia, which he used to suggest the appeal of communism in that nation came from insecurity over the pace of change. Pye also worked in Burma, where he concluded psychology was more important than economics in explaining development. Pye was no proponent of Counter-insurgency methods like the Hamlet Program. He emphasised the "need to create more effective, more adaptive, more complex, and more rationalised organisations" and saw the "heart" of the nation-building "problem" centered on the "interrelationships among personality, culture, and the polity". ARPA counterinsurgency research programs, such as the one done by Simulmatics Corporation, part of Project Agile, relied heavily on Pye's work. (One of his mentors, Harold Lasswell, had studied under Sigmund Freud.) He applied this psychological approach to his 1976 biography of Mao Zedong, who he imagined as a child and argued Mao Zedong's rebellious attitude stemmed from a desire to recapture his "infantile omnipotence." Donald L. M. Blackmer, writing in the journal Political Science and Politics, cited the Mao Zedong biography as an example of Pye's tendency to use leaps of imagination: "Interpretation and generalization abound, often unsupported by the sorts of evidence most of us have been taught to look for." Blackmer said the benefit of this approach was that Pye could "explain the otherwise inexplicable." In 1996, Pye revealed his underlying diagnosis that Mao Zedong was "probably a narcissist with a borderline personality" after The Private Life of Chairman Mao was published by Mao's doctor of 22 years.

In 1985, Pye and his wife wrote Asian Power and Politics: The Cultural Dimensions of Authority, which discussed commonalities in Asia' disparate political cultures. Critics of the book accused Pye of using flagrant stereotypes; Howard Wriggins, writing in Political Science Quarterly, asked, "Who but Lucian Pye would be bold enough" to undertake such a publication. Pye went on to serve as president of the American Political Science Association from 1988 to 1989.

== Death and Tributes ==
Pye died on September 5, 2008, in Boston, Massachusetts, at age 86. His health had gradually deteriorated after a fall the previous July, but the immediate cause of his death was pneumonia. He was survived by his wife of 63 years, the former Mary Waddill; his daughters Lyndy Pye of Northampton, Massachusetts, and Virginia Pye of Richmond, Virginia; his son, Chris, of Northampton; and three grandchildren, Anna Swann-Pye (one of the three musicians in folk group String of Birds), and Eva and Daniel Ravenal. Separate memorial services were in Belmont, Massachusetts, and at M.I.T. Charles Stewart, head of the M.I.T. political science department, said of Pye upon his death, "Lucian was a giant in the intellectual world that went well beyond our field of political science. For anyone ever called 'hero' or 'scholar' by Lucian, we must now live up to those titles he so cheerfully bestowed upon us."

== Major publications ==
- 1956. Guerrilla Communism In Malaya, Its Social And Political Meaning. Princeton University Press.
- 1958. "The Non-Western Political Process".Journal of Politics 20.3: 468–486.
- 1962. Politics, Personality, And Nation-Building: Burma'S Search For Identity. Yale University Press.
- 1965. Political Culture And Political Development (Co-Editor And Co-Author). Studies In Political Development, Vol. 5. Princeton University Press.
- 1968. The Spirit Of Chinese Politics: A Psychocultural Study Of The Authority Crisis In Political Development. MIT Press.
- 1971. Warlord Politics: Conflict And Coalition In The Modernization Of Republican China. New York: Praeger.
- 1972. With Mary W. Pye. China: An Introduction. Boston: Little & Brown.
- 1976. Mao Tse-Tung: The Man In The Leader. New York: Basic Books.
- 1981. The Dynamics Of Chinese Politics. Cambridge, Massachusetts: Oelgeschlager, Gunn & Hain.
- 1982. Chinese Commercial Negotiating Style. Cambridge, Massachusetts: Oelgeschlager, Gunn & Hain.
- 1985. With Mary W. Pye. Asian Power And Politics: The Cultural Dimensions Of Authority. Belknap Press Of Harvard University Press.
- 1988. The Mandarin And The Cadre: China's Political Cultures. Ann Arbor: Center For Chinese Studies, University Of Michigan.
- Pye, Lucian (1996). "How China's nationalism was Shanghaied?". In Unger, Jonathan (ed.). Chinese nationalism. N.Y.: M. E. Sharpe. pp. 86–112.

== References and further reading ==
- Mei, Zurong (2013), "Lucian Pye's Contributions to, and Flaws in, the Study of Chinese Political Culture" (PDF), International Journal of China Studies, 4 (1): 111–127, archived from the original (PDF) on August 22, 2016
- Verba, Sidney; Vogel, Ezra (2011), "Lucian W. Pye" (PDF), Proceedings of the American Philosophical Society, 155 (1): 102–108, archived from the original (PDF) on August 8, 2017
