= Education About Asia =

Academic journal for educators

- Discipline: Asian studies
- Language: English
- Edited by: Lucien Ellington

Publication details
- History: 1996-present
- Publisher: Association for Asian Studies (United States)
- Frequency: Triannually
- Open access: Yes

Standard abbreviations
- ISO 4: Educ. Asia

Indexing
- ISSN: 1090-6851
- LCCN: 97652872
- OCLC no.: 34427670

Links
- Journal homepage; Online access

Education About Asia is a triannual peer-reviewed academic journal published by the Association for Asian Studies especially for middle-school and university classroom teachers. The journal covers the entire field of Asian studies, including classical cultures and literature and background issues in current events. Other frequent features are guides to print and digital resources, such as movies (both feature films and documentaries), teaching materials, and web resources. The journal has published theme issues on topics that included Islam in Asia, marriage and family, youth culture, religion, economics, and business, visual and performing arts, and Asia in world history.

The journal was established in 1996 in order to support the teaching and general knowledge of the members of the association and others involved in teaching. All articles are available free online. The founding editor-in-chief is Lucien Ellington (University of Tennessee at Chattanooga).

== Reception and evaluation ==
- The French Sinological journal Revue Bibliographique De Sinologie welcomed its publication, calling it an "innovative journal" that will be "a very useful tool for teachers," and the "variety of information provided, the careful presentation will make it attractive to anyone interested in China."
- "Especially for university faculty who are new to teaching about Asia," says one scholar, "the publication is an indispensable starting place for both designing courses and building a general store of knowledge about Asia."
- The Columbia University site Education for Educators says the journal is "Highly recommended."
- University of Chicago Center for East Asia Studies called the journal a "unique and innovative journal—a practical teaching resource for secondary school, college, and university instructors, as well as an invaluable source of information for students, scholars, libraries, and anyone with an interest in Asia."
