= James B. Palais Book Prize =

The James B. Palais Book Prize has been awarded annually since 2010 by the Association for Asian Studies (AAS). Pioneer Korean studies scholar James Palais is commemorated in the name of this prize.

The Palais Prize acknowledges an outstanding English language book published on Korea; and the prize honors the author of the book.

== AAS prize ==
AAS is a scholarly, non-political, non-profit professional association which includes all persons interested in Asia. The association was founded in 1941 as publisher of the Far Eastern Quarterly (now the Journal of Asian Studies). The organization has gone through a series of reorganizations since those early days; but its continuing mission is to foster the exchange of information among scholars and to increase understanding about East Asia, South Asia, and Southeast Asia.

The Northeast Asia Council (NEAC) of the AAS oversees the James Palais Book Prize.

=== Select list of honorees ===
- 2010 — Sem Vermeersch, The Power of the Buddhas: the Politics of Buddhism during the Koryo Dynasty, 918–1392 (Harvard University Asia Center, 2008)
- 2011 — Hwasook Nam, Building Ships, Building a Nation: Korea's Democratic Unionism under Park Chung Hee (University of Washington Press, 2009)
- 2012 — Eleana J. Kim, Adopted Territory: Transnational Korean Adoptees and the Politics of Belonging (Duke University Press, 2010)
- 2013 — Suk-Young Kim, Illusive Utopia: Theater, Film and Everyday Performance in North Korea (University of Michigan Press, 2011)
- 2014 — Theodore Hughes, Literature and Film in Cold War South Korea: Freedom’s Frontier (Columbia University Press, 2012)
- 2015 — Suzy Kim, Everyday Life in the North Korean Revolution: 1945-1950 (Cornell University Press, 2013)
- 2016 — Steven Chung, Split Screen Korea: Shin Sang-ok and Postwar Cinema (University of Minnesota Press, 2014)
- 2016 Honorable Mention — Janet Poole, When the Future Disappears: The Modernist Imagination in Late Colonial Korea (Columbia University Press, 2014)
- 2017 — Jisoo Kim, The Emotions of Justice: Gender, Status, and Legal Performance in Chosŏn Korea (University of Washington Press, 2015)
- 2017 Honorable Mention — Hyun Ok Park, The Capitalist Unconscious: From Korean Unification to Transnational Korea (Columbia University Press, 2015)
- 2018 — Youngju Ryu, Writers of the Winter Republic: Literature and Resistance in Park Chung Hee’s Korea (University of Hawaii Press, 2015)
- 2018 Honorable Mention — Jaeeun Kim, Contested Embrace: Transborder Membership Politics in Twentieth-Century Korea (Stanford University Press, 2016)
- 2019 — Eunjung Kim - Curative Violence: Rehabilitating Disability, Gender, and Sexuality in Modern Korea (Duke University Press, 2017)
- 2020 — Yoon Sun Yang, From Domestic Women to Sensitive Young Men: Translating the Individual in Early Colonial Korea (Harvard University Asia Center, 2017)
- 2020 Honorable Mention - Hwansoo Ilmee Kim, The Korean Buddhist Empire: A Transnational History, 1910-1945 (Harvard University Asia Center, 2018)
- 2021 — Monica Kim, The Interrogation Rooms of the Korea War: The Untold History (Princeton University Press, 2019)
- 2021 — Heonik Kwon, After the Korean War: An Intimate History (Cambridge University Press, 2020)
- 2022 Honorable Mention — Hwisang Cho, The Power of the Brush: Epistolary Practices in Chosŏn Korea (University of Washington Press, 2020)
- 2023 — Hwasook Nam, Women in the Sky: Gender and Labor in the Making of Modern Korea (Cornell University Press, 2021)
- 2024 — Eleana J. Kim, Making Peace with Nature: Ecological Encounters along the Korean DMZ (Duke University Press)
- 2024 Honorable Mention: Maya K. H. Stiller, Carving Status at Kŭmgangsan: Elite Graffiti in Premodern Korea (University of Washington Press)
