= MIT Program on Emerging Technologies =

The Program on Emerging Technologies (PoET) is a collaborative effort between the School of Engineering and the School of Humanities, Arts, and Social Sciences (SHASS) at the Massachusetts Institute of Technology.

According to the PoET website: "Emerging technologies in areas such as ubiquitous computing, genetic engineering, and micro and nanotechnologies are developing at extraordinary rates. Understanding of the economic, security, environmental, and cultural implications of emerging technologies has not kept pace with underlying technological change. The Program on Emerging Technologies at MIT seeks to improve responses to emerging technologies by engaging early and explicitly with the pervasive uncertainty that is often under-recognized in technology assessment exercises."

PoET areas of research include planned adaptation in regulation.

== Leadership ==
- Kenneth A. Oye, Director.
- Daniel Hastings, Principal Investigator
- Merritt Roe Smith, Principal Investigator

== Funding ==
- PoET is an NSF-IGERT Program, meaning it receives funds from the National Science Foundation Integrative Graduate Education and Research Training Program.
