= Ken K. Ito =

Professor of Japanese Literature

Ken Ito is a professor emeritus of Japanese literature, particularly fiction of the Meiji era, at both the University of Michigan and the University of Hawaiʻi at Mānoa.

== Selected works ==
- An age of melodrama : family, gender, and social hierarchy in the turn-of-the-century Japanese novel. Stanford University Press. 2008. ISBN 978-0-8047-5777-5. Winner of the John Whitney Hall Book Prize in 2010.
- Visions of Desire: Tanizaki's Fictional Worlds. Stanford University Press. 1991. ISBN 978-0-8047-6607-4.
