= The Journal of Japanese Studies =

Journal of Japanese Studies
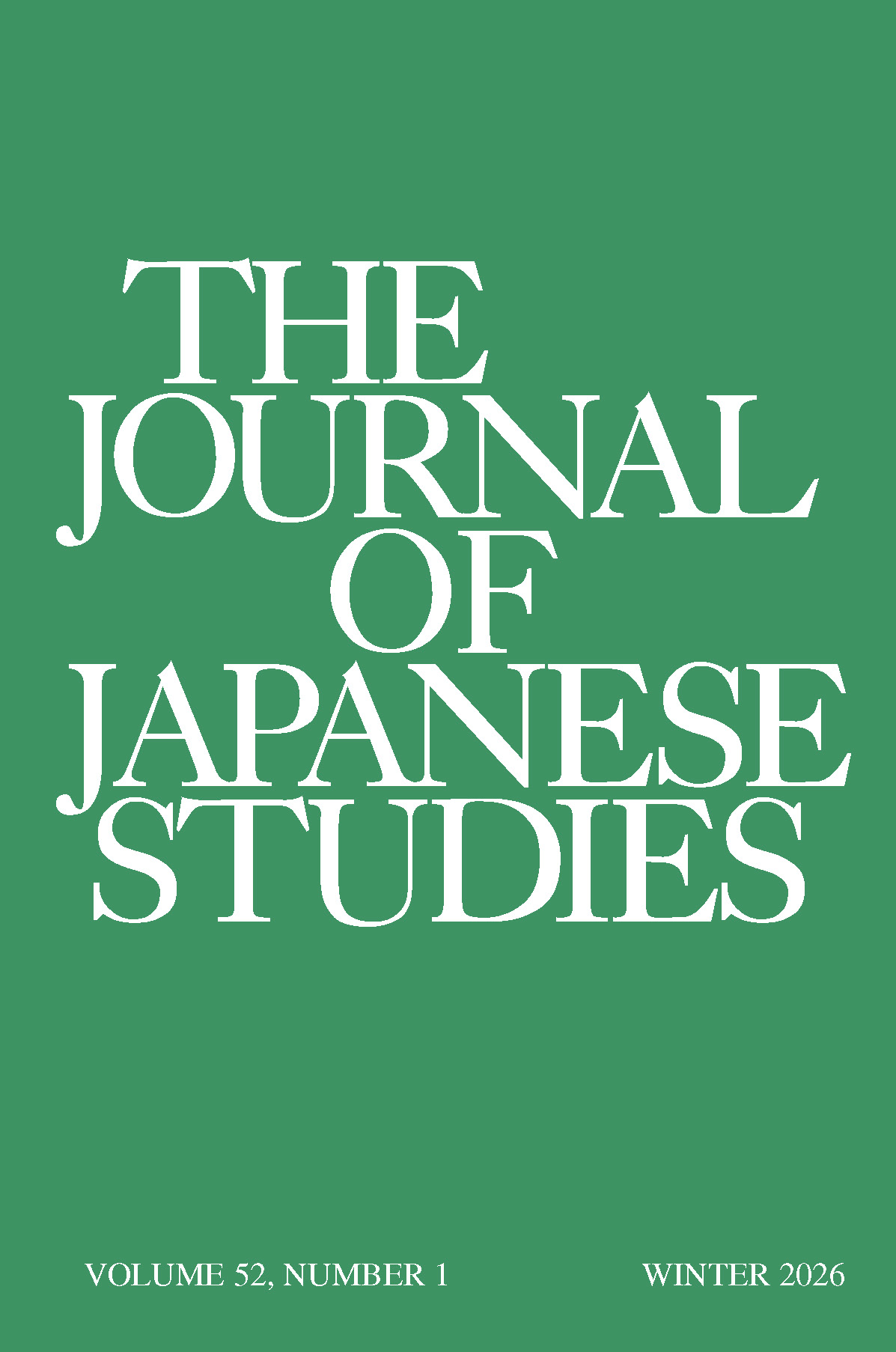
- The front cover of the Winter 2026 issue
- Discipline: Japanese studies
- Language: English
- Edited by: Sabine Frühstück and Morgan Pitelka

Publication details
- History: 1974–present
- Publisher: University of California Press (United States)
- Frequency: Semiannual

Standard abbreviations
- ISO 4: J. Jpn. Stud.

Indexing
- ISSN: 0095-6848 (print); 1549-4721 (web)
- LCCN: 75641024
- JSTOR: 00956848
- OCLC no.: 1798633

Links
- Journal homepage

The Journal of Japanese Studies is a journal dealing with research on Japan in the United States. It is a multidisciplinary forum for communicating new information, new interpretations, and recent research results concerning Japan to the English-reading world.

The journal is published twice each year – winter and summer – with an annual total of approximately 500 pages. It was begun in 1974 with Kenneth B. Pyle as its first editor. It is now co-edited by Sabine Frühstück and Morgan Pitelka. Jessamyn R. Abel is the book review editor. Susan Hanley, a professor of Japanese studies at the University of Washington, was a long-standing editor for over 25 years. The journal awards the Kenneth B. Pyle Prize for Best Article on an annual basis.

The Journal of Japanese Studies is published by the University of California Press on behalf of the Society for Japanese Studies, and its contents are available online in the JSTOR database with a moving wall of 5 years.
