= The Journal of Asian Studies =

- Discipline: Asian studies
- Language: English
- Edited by: Joseph Alter

Publication details
- Former name: The Far Eastern Quarterly
- History: 1941–present
- Publisher: Duke University Press on behalf of the Association for Asian Studies
- Frequency: Quarterly
- Impact factor: 0.917 (2017)

Standard abbreviations
- ISO 4: J. Asian Stud.

Indexing
- ISSN: 0021-9118 (print); 1752-0401 (web)
- LCCN: 43014717
- JSTOR: 00219118
- OCLC no.: 466937010

Links
- Journal homepage; Online access; Online archive

The Journal of Asian Studies is the flagship journal of the Association for Asian Studies, publishing peer-reviewed academic scholarship in the field of Asian studies. Its acceptance rate is approximately 6%. Each issue circulates over 8,200 copies, reaching a readership across the academic community and beyond.

== History ==
The journal was established in 1941, as The Far Eastern Quarterly, changing to its current title in September 1956. Before 2023, the journal was published by Cambridge University Press. From 1941 to 1991, the Association for Asian Studies published an annual Bibliography of Asian Studies as a supplement to the journal. Since 1991 the bibliography has only been available by separate subscription.

Published by Duke University Press since 2023, under the guidance of its editorial board, it presents empirical and multidisciplinary work on Asia, spanning the arts, history, literature, the social sciences, and cultural studies. In addition to research, current interest, and state-of-the-field articles, a large section of the journal is devoted to book reviews.

== Editors-in-chief ==
The following are or have been editor-in-chief of the journal:

- Cyrus Peake (1941–)
- Earl H. Pritchard
- Donald Shively (1956–1959)
- Roger F. Hackett (1959–1962, University of Michigan, Ann Arbor)
- David D. Buck (1990–1994, University of Wisconsin–Milwaukee)
- Anand A. Yang (1995–2000, University of Utah)
- Ann Waltner (2001–2004, University of Minnesota)
- Kenneth M. George (2005–2008, University of Wisconsin–Madison)
- Jeffrey Wasserstrom (2008–2018, University of California-Irvine)
- Vinayak Chaturvedi (2018–2021, University of California-Irvine)
- Joseph Alter (2021–present, University of Pittsburgh

== Abstracting and indexing ==
The journal is abstracted and indexed in the Arts and Humanities Citation Index, Social Sciences Citation Index, and Scopus. According to the Journal Citation Reports, the journal has a 2017 impact factor of 0.917.
