= Association for Asian Studies =

Scholarly non-profit professional association

- Abbreviation: AAS
- Formation: 1941
- Type: Nonprofit
- Legal status: Public charity
- Headquarters: University of Michigan, Ann Arbor, Michigan, US
- Website: www.asianstudies.org

The Association for Asian Studies (AAS) is a scholarly, non-political, and non-profit professional association focusing on Asia and the study of Asia. It is based in Ann Arbor, Michigan, United States.

Among its major activities are the Annual Conference, with attendance around 3,000, normally based in North America each spring, the Journal of Asian Studies, regional conferences, and other professional activities.

== History ==
Shortly after The First World War, the American Council of Learned Societies, with the support of the Rockefeller Foundation, gave Mortimer Graves a mandate to develop Chinese studies in the United States. Kenneth Scott Latourette would recall in 1955 the "people of the United States and those who led them knew little of the peoples and cultures of the Far East" and that was "in spite of political, commercial and cultural commitments in the region and of events which already were hurrying them on into ever more intimate relations." Graves worked with Arthur W. Hummel, Sr. of the Oriental Division of the Library of Congress, the Institute of Pacific Relations, the Harvard-Yenching Institute, the American Oriental Society, as well as with colleges, universities, and museums.

Twenty-eight people attended the first meeting of the planning group, which was held at the Harvard Club in New York in 1928, and further meetings were held over the next decade. In 1936, the group began publishing the Far Eastern Bibliography. On 6 June 1941 the Far Eastern Association was formed and issued The Far Eastern Quarterly as its organ, with Cyrus Peake as Managing Editor. The Quarterly survived the war with the financial help that Kenneth W. Colgrove obtained from Northwestern University.

World War II brought many academics into the government, some in the active military and some in the Office of War Information or the Office of Strategic Services, both of which were intelligence agencies which used academic disciplines and scholarly forms of analysis. When the war was over, political scientists, historians, and social scientists continued to be concerned with contemporary affairs. The Far Eastern Association reflected an Area studies approach, geographically grounded division of labor, rather than by academic discipline, with the association subdivided into East Asian, Southeast Asian, and South Asian Studies. (In the late 20th century, the field of Central and Inner Asia was added.) The Ford Foundation provided money and co-ordination to area studies centers, which, in turn, supported the AAS.

After the war, an organizational meeting of some 200 people was held at Columbia University on April 2, 1948, following the annual meeting of the American Oriental Society, to which many of the Far Eastern group belonged. The Constitution of the new group was drafted by Edwin O. Reischauer, Woodbridge Bingham, and Earl H. Pritchard. The Association's inaugural president was Arthur W. Hummel, Sr.

Since 1949, the Association for Asian Studies has held an annual four-day conference each spring, featuring scholarly paper presentations, roundtable discussions, workshops, and panel sessions on various topics related to Asian studies.

In 1956, the organization was renamed to the Association for Asian Studies to expand its scope to cover all areas of Asia, including South and Southeast Asia. Attendance grew from 200 for the organizational meeting in 1948 to 605 at the first annual meeting in 1949 and to 2,434 in 1963.

Criticism of the Association and the Area Studies field grew in the 1960s, especially in light of growing opposition to the Vietnam War. Bruce Cumings, writing in the Bulletin of Concerned Asian Scholars, charged that for the AAS to participate in this way of funding scholarship on Asia led to confusing academic research and government intelligence work. He further argued that the area studies approach in general emphasized contemporary social science theory, not the classic approaches of Oriental studies, which used philology and studied ancient civilizations. Cumings called that an "implicit Faustian bargain." AAS President William Theodore de Bary called for the organization to take a position on the war that was "nonpolitical but not unconcerned." The active opposition to the war was left to the much smaller Committee of Concerned Asian Scholars.

The organization was further restructured in 1970, when four elective area Councils were formed, representative of each of the four areas of Asia: South Asia (SAC), Southeast Asia (SEAC), China and Inner Asia (CIAC) and Northeast Asia (NEAC). The councils were formed so that each area of Asia could have a proportionate voice in the Association and on the board of directors. In 1977, a Council of Conferences (COC) was established both to co-ordinate the regional conferences held by the Association and to discover ways to better serve the needs of Asia studies scholars in various parts of the United States. Area library organizations have been formed for South Asia (CONSALD), South East Asia, and East Asia (CEAL).

== Book prizes ==
The AAS administers and awards a number of prizes:

- Joseph Levenson Pre-1900 Book Prize (China) and Joseph Levenson Post-1900 Book Prize (China) in honor of Joseph Levenson
- E. Gene Smith Book Prize (Inner Asia) in honor of E. Gene Smith
- Patrick D. Hanan Book Prize for Translation (China and Inner Asia) in honor of Patrick D. Hanan
- John Whitney Hall Book Prize (Japan) in honor of John Whitney Hall
- James B. Palais Book Prize (Korea) in honor of James Palais
- Bernard Cohn Book Prize (first book on South Asia) in honor of Bernard Cohn
- A.K. Coomaraswamy Book Prize (South Asia) in honor of Ananda Coomaraswamy
- A.K. Ramanujan Prize for Translation (South Asia) in honor of A.K. Ramanujan
- Harry J. Benda Prize (first book on Southeast Asia) in honor of Harry J. Benda
- George McT. Kahin Prize (Southeast Asia) in honor of George McT. Kahin
- Franklin R. Buchanan Prize for Curricular Materials in honor of Franklin R. Buchanan
- The Bei Shan Tang Prizes for Chinese art history

== Publications ==
- The Journal of Asian Studies has been published quarterly since 1941, when it was founded as The Far Eastern Quarterly. JAS publishes multidisciplinary work on Asia, spanning the arts, history, literature, the social sciences, and cultural studies.
- The Bibliography of Asian Studies: Now an online database, the BAS is the single largest record of research and scholarly literature on East, Southeast, and South Asia written in Western languages. It comprises over 800,000 citations and can be electronically searched. Started as an annual section of the Far Eastern Quarterly edited by members in 1941, the BAS grew to an annual supplement produced by a specialized professional staff. However, by the mid-1980s, gathering the burgeoning data and printing the increasingly thick volumes led to the annual editions falling several years behind. The Association determined to transfer BAS to an electronic database, incorporating all entries from the print volumes for the years 1971 to 1991 and entering new citations from 1991 onward. It is considered the "standard bibliographical tool for Western language resources in the field of Asian studies" and the "single most important record of research and scholarly literature on Asia written in Western languages." It is compiled on the basis of "durable scholarly interest"
- Education About Asia (EAA) is a journal published three times a year which contains scholarly articles and practical teaching resources for secondary school, college, and university instructors, as well as for students, scholars, libraries, and others with an interest in Asia. Topics include anthropology, Asian studies, business and economics, education, geography, government, history, language and literature, political science, religion, and sociology. The complete run of the journal was put online for free access in 2014
- Key Issues in Asian Studies
- Asia Past and Present: a scholarly monograph series covering all countries of Asia and all disciplines.

== Sources and further reading ==
- Berger, Mark T. (2003). The Battle for Asia : From Decolonization to Globalization. New York London: RoutledgeCurzon. ISBN 978-0-415-32528-8.
- Hucker, Charles O. (1973). The Association for Asian Studies: An Interpretive History. Seattle: Published for the Association for Asian Studies by the University of Washington Press. ISBN 978-0-295-95266-6.
- ——— (1968). "The Association for Asian Studies, Inc., at the Age of Twenty: Annual Report for 1967-1968". The Journal of Asian Studies. 28 (1): 201–241. doi:10.1017/S0021911800034355. JSTOR 2942888. S2CID 163539616.
- Latourette, Kenneth Scott (1955). "Far Eastern Studies in the United States: Retrospect and Prospect". Far Eastern Quarterly. 15 (3): 3–11. doi:10.2307/2942098. JSTOR 2942098. S2CID 165643631.
- Linton, Matthew D (2017). "Any Enlightened Government: Mortimer Graves' Plan for a National Center for Far Eastern Studies, 1935–1946". Journal of American-East Asian Relations. 24 (1): 7–26. doi:10.1163/18765610-02401005.
- Pritchard, Earl H (1963). "The Foundations of the Association for Asian Studies, 1928–48". The Journal of Asian Studies. 22 (4): 513–523. doi:10.1017/s0021911800108447.
