= Harry Harootunian =

American historian

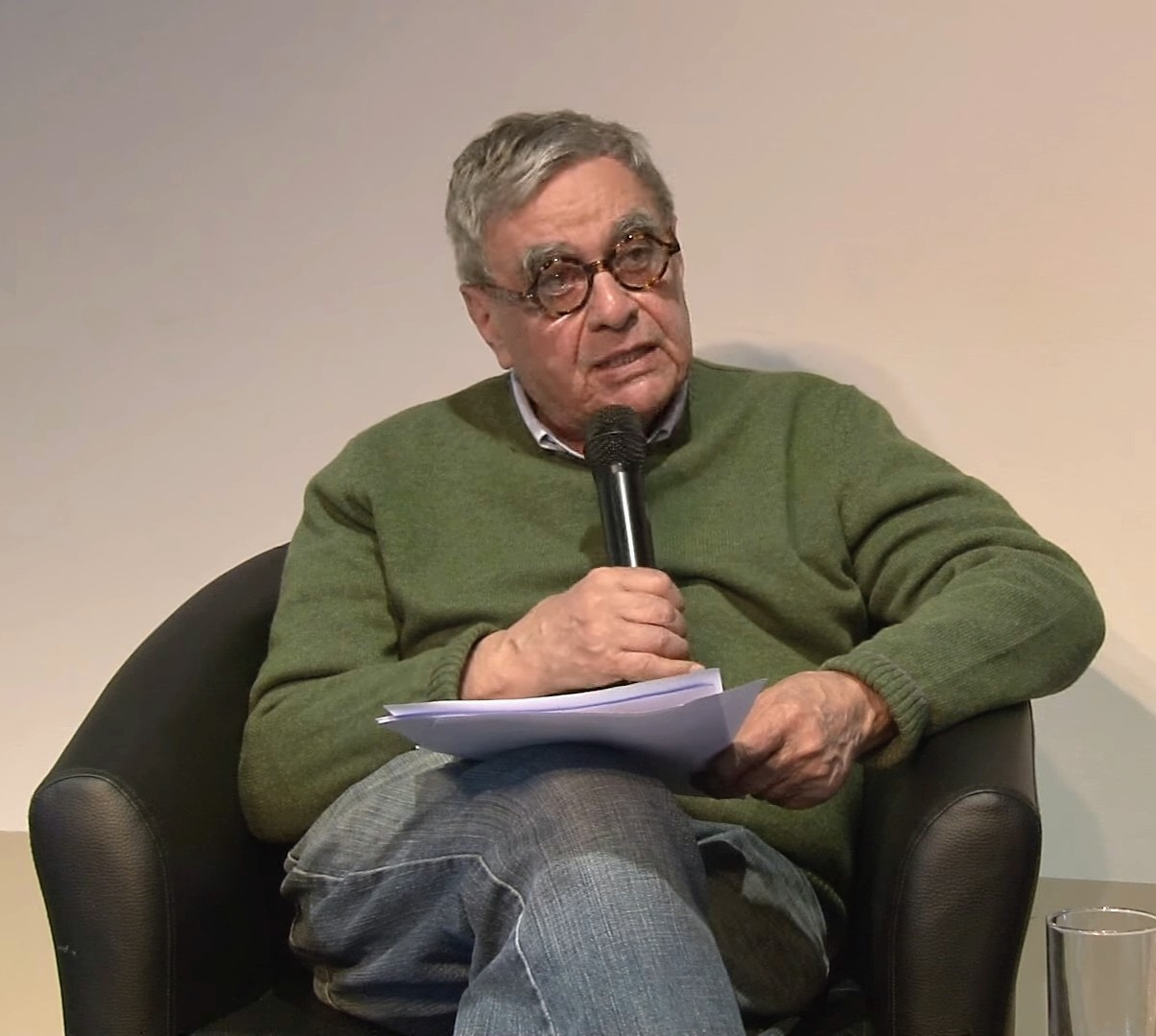
- Harry Harootunian in 2016
- Born: 1929 (age 96–97)

Academic background
- Education: University of Michigan, Ann Arbor; Wayne State University

Academic work
- School or tradition: Critical theory, area studies, cultural studies
- Institutions: University of Rochester; University of Chicago; University of California, Santa Cruz; New York University
- Doctoral students: Anne Allison, Alexandra Munroe, Miriam Silverberg

Harry D. Harootunian (born 1929) is an Armenian-American historian of early modern and modern Japan with an interest in historical theory. He is Professor Emeritus of East Asian Studies, New York University, and Max Palevsky Professor of History and Civilizations, Emeritus, University of Chicago.

Harootunian edited volumes on 20th-century politics in Japan, but is best known for a series of wide-ranging monographs on the development of Japanese social and intellectual thought from late Tokugawa period through the middle of the 20th century.

== Career ==
Harootunian took his Ph.D. in History in 1958 from University of Michigan, Ann Arbor, where he studied under John Whitney Hall, after earning a master's degree there in Far Eastern Studies in 1953. He is a 1951 graduate of Wayne State University. He has taught at University of Rochester, University of Chicago, University of California, Santa Cruz, where he was Dean of Humanities, and New York University.

He was Editor, Journal of Asian Studies, Coeditor, Critical Inquiry, and with Rey Chow and Masao Miyoshi, co-edited the Asia-Pacific series for Duke University Press.

== Scholarship on Japanese intellectual history ==
Harootunian's first monograph, Toward Restoration; the Growth of Political Consciousness in Tokugawa Japan (1970), deals with the period when a stable feudal Japan began to show tensions, leading up to the opening of the country in the 1850s and the Meiji Restoration in 1868. Kenneth Pyle, reviewing the book in The American Historical Review, wrote that many historians saw the Meiji Restoration not as a revolution but as a change carried out in the name of tradition by men who did not foresee its social ramifications. Harootunian, said Pyle, “has little patience with this view.” The book attacked the “inordinate effort to minimize the revolutionary dimensions of the Meiji Restoration and argued instead that the activists were “no less eager to repudiate history than French revolutionaries in 1789. The values they espoused were traditional in name only.” Only the vocabulary was traditional. Pyle adds that “this is not an easy book” but the approach to intellectual history is “nonetheless intelligent and imaginative.”

Things Seen and Unseen: Discourse and Ideology in Tokugawa Nativism (1988) focuses on Kokugaku, which Harootunian translates as "nativist," a loosely related group that resisted Sinocentric, or Chinese, traditions and developed new frameworks which emphasized home-grown thought. Their ideas were then used by groups, especially agrarian elites, outside the capital and major cities to assert their legitimacy on the basis of Japanese traditions. The thinkers included such men as Kamo Mabuchi (1697-1769), Motoori Norinaga (1730-1801), and their successors, such as Hirata Atsutane (1776-1843). Samuel H. Yamashita, writing in the Harvard Journal of Asiatic Studies, said “without a doubt" this is "an extraordinary book... offering nothing less than a reinterpretation of the kokugaku movement, one that diverges in content and form from the existing scholarship, both Western and Japanese.” Yamashita saw echoes of Michel Foucault in Harootunian's drive to uncover the rules, rituals, and education that determine what is right and what is wrong and what it is possible to think. He also saw the influence of Hayden White in Harootunian's attention to language and formal structure, Harootunian, wrote Yamashita, wants to show how kokugaku scholars resisted and contested the prevailing "official culture and ideology." The last chapters of the book show that this kokugaku thought was misappropriated by political figures in the early 20th century for chauvinistic purposes. Yamashita added that this “is not, by conventional standards, a very readable book, but the puzzling and occasionally obtuse prose was partly intended" and that "readers unfamiliar with the issues being discussed and the theoretical material invoked will miss the main points of the book.”

Overcome by Modernity (2000) deals with the artists, critics, philosophers, poets, and social scientists of the 1920s and 1930s, a period when Japan had entered into the “heroic phase of capitalism.” They were caught in the dilemma of explaining why Japan had to "overcome modernity" while explaining why it could not. Jeffrey Hanes of the University of Oregon, wrote in the American Historical Review, that “this is a formidable book” that is a “challenging sometimes maddening read, but one that rewards us with a terrifically insightful and poignant evocation of Japan’s attempts to come to grips with the modern world into which it was thrust and into which it then threw itself.”

== Cultural studies, critical theory, and critique of Area Studies ==
Harootunian was a proponent of the movement to adapt and apply critical theory in a way that would put Japan in the same frame of analysis as other capitalist countries rather than making it exotic. John Lie, a University of California, Berkeley sociologist, reviewed the use of cultural studies in the Japan field and saw Harutoonian and his University of Chicago colleague Tetsuo Najita as pioneers whose impact spread from Chicago through their example and the graduate students they trained. Lie referred to the two collectively as "Najitunian". The University of Hawaii historian Patricia G. Steinhoff talked of the "paradigm shift" in the 1980s in which the field of Japanese studies learned to "speak Najitunian."

Both Lie and Steinhoff showed caution. Lie in particular objected to the influence of Edward Said's Orientalism and used the "University of Chicago School" as an example. Lie's objection was that this approach put all Asian countries into one category, did not give enough weight to historical change, and did not place enough emphasis on class differences. In reply to a review by Ian Buruma, however, Harutoonian stated "I am not now nor have I ever been either a 'deconstructionist' or for that matter a Maoist."

Harootunian deplored the overuse of modernization theory in the development of the field, especially the involvement and distorting influence of government agencies and private foundations such as the Rockefeller Foundation and the Ford Foundation. The volume Harutoonian edited with Masao Miyoshi in 2002, Learning Places: The Afterlives of Area Studies is a collection of essays that critically examine the rise of Area Studies during the Cold War, then analyze the late 20th century, post-Cold War "need of foreign governments, mostly outside Euro-America, to pay American universities and colleges to teach courses on their histories and societies." The Japanese, Korean, and Taiwanese governments especially felt this need. The editors argue that Area Studies movement was based on the wartime need to study the enemy, but "fifty years after the war's end, American scholars are still organizing knowledge as if confronted by an implacable enemy and thus driven by the desire to either destroy it or marry it." Universities seek to maintain this structure by soliciting these foreign donations. The Association for Asian Studies, continue Harutoonian and Miyoshi, therefore missed the opportunity to make the study of Asia into a part of the general learning of the world rather than closing off the study of individual nations. Areas Studies also suffers from accepting the traditional disciplines. The newer cultural studies, on the other hand, rise above national borders or dissolve disciplinary boundaries.

In Marx after Marx: History and Time in the Expansion of Capitalism (2015) Harootunian argues that "Western Marxism" should not be allowed to offer a purely European explanation of capitalism, since Marx himself offered a "deprovincialized" analysis rooted in Asia, Africa, and Latin America.

== Selected publications ==
- —— (2015). Marx after Marx: History and Time in the Expansion of Capitalism. New York: Columbia University Press. ISBN 9780231174800.
- —— (2004). The Empire's New Clothes: Paradigm Lost, and Regained. Prickly Paradigm. ISBN 9780972819671.
- History's Disquiet: Modernity, Cultural Practice and the Question of the Everyday Life, Columbia University Press, 2000. ISBN 0-231-11794-9.
- Overcome by Modernity: History, Culture and Commodity in Interwar Japan, Princeton University Press, 2000. (ISBN 0-691-09548-5)
- with Masao Miyoshi, Japan in the World, ed., Duke University Press, 1993. (ISBN 0-822-31368-5)
- with Masao Miyoshi, Postmodernism in Japan, Duke University Press, 1989. (ISBN 0-822-30896-7)
- Things Seen and Unseen: Discourse and Ideology in Tokugawa Nativism, University of Chicago Press, 1988. (ISBN 0-226-31707-2)
- with Bernard S. Silberman, and Gail Lee Bernstein. Japan in Crisis: Essays on Taisho Democracy. (Princeton, NJ: Princeton University Press, 1974). ISBN
- —— (1970). Toward Restoration; the Growth of Political Consciousness in Tokugawa Japan. Berkeley: University of California Press. ISBN 0520015665.
- with Bernard S. Silberman. Modern Japanese Leadership; Transition and Change. (Tucson: University of Arizona Press, 1966). ISBN
- with Vera Micheles Dean, West and Non-West: New Perspectives, an Anthology. (New York: Holt, Contemporary Civilizations Series, 1963). ISBN
