= Hillcrest High School (Queens) =

Public school in New York City

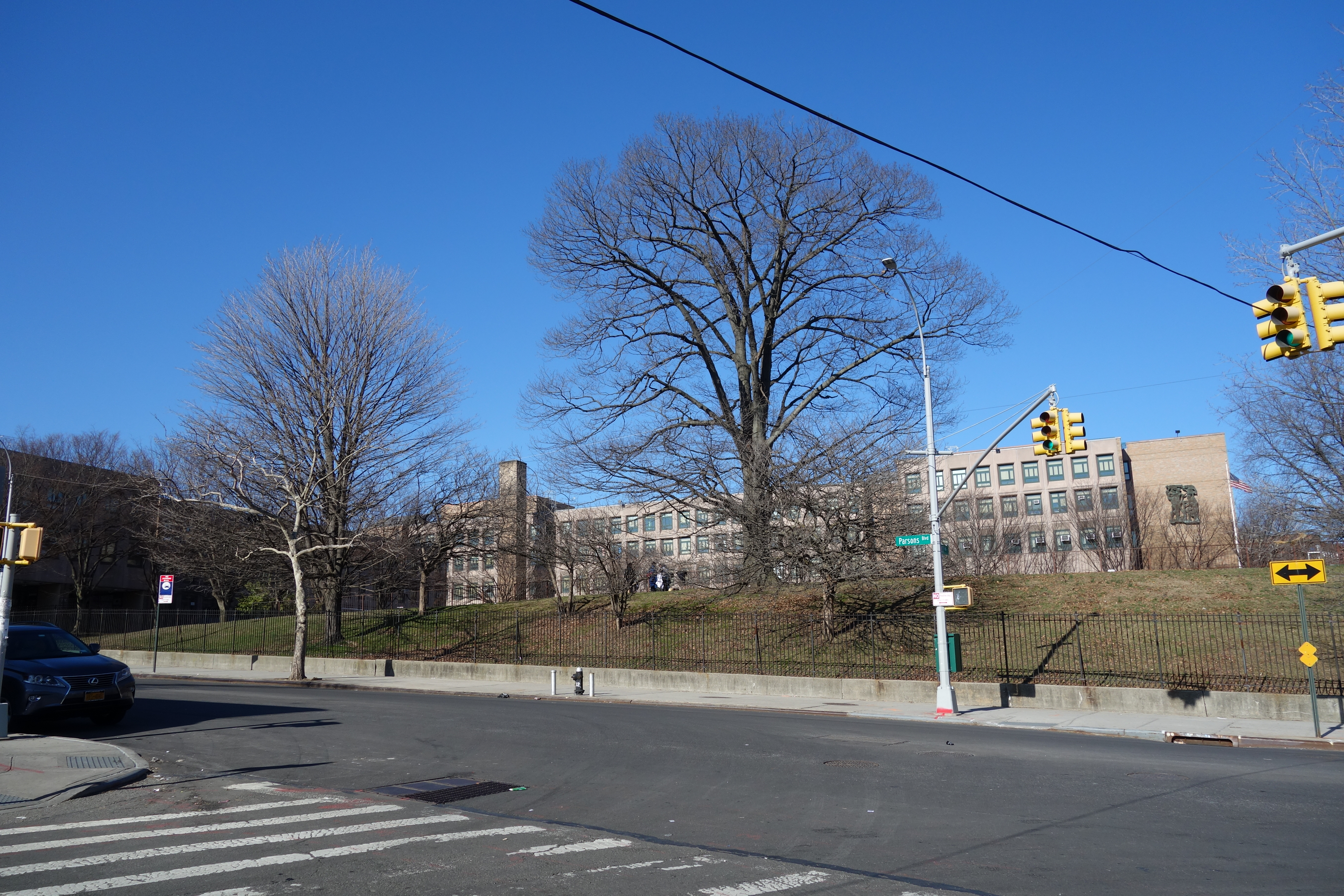
- Looking east from Parsons Boulevard

Location
- 160-05 Highland Ave. Jamaica, Queens, New York 11432; United States; 40.709°N 73.8022°W

Information
- Type: Public
- School district: New York City Department of Education
- NCES School ID: 360010001965
- Principal: Varun Rule Pandey
- Teaching staff: 154.75 (on an FTE basis)
- Grades: 9-12
- Enrollment: 2,333 (2023-2024)
- Student to teacher ratio: 15.08
- Campus: City: large
- Colors: Violet and gray
- Mascot: Hawks
- Yearbook: Prospectus
- Website: www.hillcrestweb.com

Hillcrest High School is a four-year public high school in Jamaica Hills, Queens, New York City. The school is operated by the New York City Department of Education.

As of the 2014–15 school year, the school had an enrollment of 3,289 students and 149.2 classroom teachers (on an FTE basis), for a student–teacher ratio of 22.0:1. There were 2,380 students (72.4% of enrollment) eligible for free lunch and 311 (9.5% of students) eligible for reduced-cost lunch.

The mascot is the hawk (changed from the Brave, the original mascot chosen when the school opened in 1971) and the school colors are violet and gray.

== Athletics ==
The school's boys and girls' soccer team became division champions in the 06–07 and 07–08 season, guided by Coach Asqui and captain Joao Azevedo. The school is also notable for its rigorous baseball program, led by Coach Malave.

== History ==
Stephen M. Duch was the school principal from 1996 to the beginning of 2014. After his retirement, David T. Morrison, a graduate of Hillcrest who served as the AP of English for several years, became the new principal.

In 2002, Hillcrest was listed as the most violent high school in the city.

On November 20, 2023, several hundred Hillcrest students participated in a protest, with the goal of having a teacher fired for her participation in a rally supporting Israel.

== Notable alumni ==
This is a partial list of notable alumni of Hillcrest High School.

- Fran Drescher (Class of 1975), actress, best known for her role on The Nanny. While there she was told to get voice lessons. Her character Fran Fine from The Nanny also graduated from Hillcrest.
- Nina Foxx (Class of 1982), award-winning author, playwright, filmmaker, and technologist; wrote the NAACP Image Award-nominated novel Momma: Gone
- Bianca Golden (Class of 2006), model, best known for America's Next Top Model (Cycle 9)
- Sherrilyn Ifill (Class of 1980), president and director-counsel of the NAACP Legal Defense Fund
- Melinda Katz (born 1965), Queens County District Attorney, 19th Borough President of Queens, Member of the New York City Council, and Member of the New York State Assembly
- Rory Lancman (born 1969), politician, former member of the New York City Council
- William Matthew London, (class of 1975) Professor of public health and consumer advocate
- Kenneth Pomeranz (Class of 1976), historian best known for his book The Great Divergence
- Ray Romano (Class of 1975), actor, best known for his role as Ray Barone in Everybody Loves Raymond and Manny in all five Ice Age movies
