= Neijuan =

Economic concept that describes an excess of competition

- Simplified Chinese: 内卷
- Traditional Chinese: 內卷
- Hanyu Pinyin: nèijuǎn
- Literal meaning: "to curl inwards"
Transcriptions
Standard Mandarin
- Hanyu Pinyin: nèijuǎn
- Bopomofo: ㄋㄟˋ ㄐㄩㄢˇ
- IPA: [nêɪ.tɕɥɛ̀n]
Yue: Cantonese
- Yale Romanization: noih gyún
- Jyutping: noi6 gyun2
- IPA: [nɔj˨kyn˧˥]

Neijuan, (Note: Chinese: 内卷; pinyin: nèijuǎn; lit. 'to curl inwards' IPA: [nei̯˥˩tɕɥɛn˩˧]) sometimes known by the English term involution, is a Chinese term that describes a condition in which a system, institution, or competitive process continues to intensify in effort, complexity, or participation without a corresponding increase in output, efficiency, or collective benefit. Neijuan is the Chinese calque of the English word involution. Neijuan is written with two characters which mean 'inside' and 'curling/rolling'.

Neijuan had been used to describe an uneven distribution of social, economic, and educational resources and ongoing economic malaise, especially in terms of higher education bodies and labor markets. On a macroeconomic level, neijuan has led to overproduction and diminishing returns for capital owners who engage in fierce price wars that aggravate deflationary pressures in a pure unregulated market. When capital owners are driven by competition they must work increasingly more for little or no marginal gain despite falling prices for consumers so price fixing or 'price leadership' becomes impossible. On a personal level, neijuan reflects a life of being overworked, stressed, anxious and feeling trapped, a lifestyle where many face the negative effects of living a very competitive life for nothing.

== Origin and conceptualization ==
Involution was developed as a sociological concept by American anthropologist Alexander Goldenweiser in his 1937 book Anthropology: An Introduction To Primitive Culture. In this work, Goldenweiser identifies involution as a cultural process. That when a society reaches its final form it cannot evolve nor stabilize itself. Instead, it can only complicate its internal elements. Goldenweiser uses Māori decorative art as an example. The development of art was done within the framework of already existing patterns. The final pieces were elaborate and complicated in appearance but fundamentally the same as existing art.

This term was later utilized by fellow American anthropologist Clifford Geertz, who popularized the term in his 1963 book Agricultural Involution: The Processes of Ecological Change in Indonesia. In this work, Geertz analyzed the rice farming process in Indonesia following Dutch colonial rule. Geertz found that despite the complexity of the process, coupled with the increasing amount of labor being assigned to it, productivity remained stagnant. All these efforts to increase productivity yielded little results, while complicating the already existing processes and systems. For Geertz this was involution.

Geertz's concept was introduced into Chinese rural studies by the Indian sinologist Prasenjit Duara and the Chinese historian Philip Huang (黄宗智; Huang Chung-Chih), arousing some controversy in Chinese academic circles. Huang explained involution using the economic concept of diminishing returns in his book The Peasant Economy and Social Change in North China (华北的小农经济与社会变迁), published in 2000, which deviated from Geertz's original explanation.

Involution has been described as, 'a process in which increasing levels of individual effort and competition fail to produce proportional gains in productivity or outcomes, resulting instead in diminishing returns and intensified internal competition for capital owners.' As more participants in the market adopt similar strategies to secure limited opportunities, relative advantages among capitalists disappear, creating a self-reinforcing cycle in which greater input is required merely to maintain their same market position. This lack of surplus value to spend on political control also hurts capital owners by preventing their natural capture of state power in a pure market at the expense of the consumer who funds their ownership of the persons and tools of government through patronage and relative advantage.

Since 2020, the word involution (neijuan) has become an internet slang word in mainland China, and by extension refers to a culture in which people are expected to keep ahead of others. It can also have other negative connotations including 'cut throat competition', and 'race to the bottom', depending on context. Xiang Biao, an anthropologist, describes involution as "a dead loop in which people constantly force themselves" and "a race that participants are not allowed to fail or exit". Some other people describe it as a process in which people "gain a slight advantage by exploiting themselves and competing excessively within a group". Influenced by its popularity, the number of academic papers containing the word involution has increased, but the meaning has further deviated from the original sociological sense, leading to some criticism that the word is being abused.

== Dissemination and evolution ==
In contemporary China, the concept of neijuan has spread through media outlets like newspapers and social media platforms like Weibo. On Weibo, the number of page views of various topics related to neijuan has exceeded 1 billion, and in an election in 2020, neijuan was one of China's "top 10 buzzwords" of the year. Neijuan has become so popular because it has a strong influence on the ways of living for youth and contemporary middle-class parents.

=== Tsinghua's Involuted King ===
Involuted King refers to someone who works extremely hard, by fair means or foul, in order to cope with neijuan.

In September 2020, a picture of a university student from the elite Tsinghua University in Beijing working on his laptop while still riding his bike went viral on social media with more than 1 billion views. The picture of the boy resonated with most millennials and generation Z which includes people born after the 1990s.

This incident sparked others to post pictures of other hard-working students who were dubbed Involuted Kings. The liking and reposting of similar pictures made neijuan among China's top 10 buzzwords of the year.

=== Neijuan in the IT industry ===
In 2021, the concept of university neijuan translated into China's competitive tech industry, which is the preferred destination for most graduates. With an increasing number of graduates with relevant educational qualifications, the job market is becoming very competitive. This leaves many to work in areas they are overqualified for, like becoming takeaway drivers. In association with these views, these pictures were popularized.

=== 996 working culture ===
Many graduates get involved in 996 working culture, like takeaway services, after they leave university. Many takeaway drivers deliver food for Meituan, a delivery-service corporation with a competitive business culture.

=== Economic overproduction ===
Beginning in 2024, the Chinese Communist Party (CCP), in its theoretical journal Qiushi, has identified neijuan as a macroeconomic concern. In the context of macroeconomics, neijuan has been defined as "unhealthy competition in which economic actors seeking to maintain their position in a market, or competing for share of a limited market, constantly invest substantial resources and energy without generating any profit growth." With falling production costs and sales prices leading to concern over deflation, the CCP has sought to combat neijuan by guiding and regulating private businesses and standardizing nationwide market conditions.

== Associated cultural aspects ==
=== Education ===
==== Parental views ====
As a result of neijuan, most Chinese middle-class parents no longer see education as a conveyance of upward social mobility. Parents feel the need to overcompensate just to ensure their children won't fall back on the social ladder in the coming years. These intensified efforts are through active involvement and increased spending. Parental involvement is manifested in the following ways.

First, parents familiarize themselves with what is being taught at school, to ensure they can teach their children if needed. It has become a common occurrence for parents to buy three copies of books in subjects like mathematics, one book for the student, one for the parents at home and one to be left at work.

Second, compared to their Western counterparts, the struggle of choosing the best educational institutions starts as early as daycare and not pre-university. Parents are anxious because of increasing competition, and correspondingly start getting fully involved in their children's education from a very young age. As a consequence of neijuan, parents feel that nurturing competent applicants for elite universities requires them to follow an established order of doing things. Timing has also become a significant factor.

Third, parents now find themselves in positions where they must push their children very hard, and children have little to no say. Pressuring their children is a characteristic that many middle-class parents share. This behavior has popularized terms like jiwa ('chicken child'), tiger mom, and chicken blood, (Note: Refers to a pseudoscientific fad in China where people believed that injecting blood from roosters would boost longevity. Dajixue ('to inject chicken blood') has been since used to refer to a heightened excited state.) referring to the ambitious and pushy parenting of contemporary Chinese parents. A tiger mom is a controlling mother who does not allow her children any freedom. Examples of tiger mom behavior include making primary school children study subjects like chemistry and physics through after-school tutoring even though schools do not introduce these subjects until the third year of junior secondary school. One parent explained "it is not enough to compete just in terms of studies", having some sort of talent is now seen as a significant entry requirement to elite universities. As a result, some talents such as playing the piano and swimming are not as valuable as they once were, as shown in the lists below:

Music: Organ > harp > cello > violin > flute > saxophone > drums > piano
Sports: Equestrian > golf > ice hockey > fencing > baseball and American football > figure skating > tennis > soccer > taekwondo > badminton > swimming > running

Moreover, middle-class Chinese parents overcompensate for the cost spent on their children's education. In the 2010s and 2020s there has been a trend for parents to relocate to Haidian, a district in Beijing. Haidian is well known for self-sacrificing and education-focused parents, because of the strong public institutions found in the area. Schools in Haidian teach programming from a very young age; by the time children are in secondary school, they are already at an advanced level in programming languages like C++ and Python. In other subjects such as mathematics, many schools in Haidian have their students start learning secondary school mathematics when they are only in the fifth or sixth grade, laying a foundation for future studies. Most parents want to move to cities with quality public schools like the city of Haidian, regardless of cost. To ensure their children can attend esteemed schools, parents pay high real estate prices. Meanwhile, the cost of after-school tutoring is extremely high. The price of an after-school class for junior secondary school students in Haidian can reach RMB 1,000 per hour.

==== University student views ====
In university, learning is more independent, and students are responsible for what and when they learn. Though university is thought of as a time to make new friends, explore new interests and understand oneself better, the reality is different in China.

=== Work-life balance ===
In China, the work–life balance of younger social elites is very different from their predecessors. Young people are "trapped" in hyper-competitive and unhealthy work environments, which have become the "new industry standard". To ensure they stay relevant at work, employees follow the 996 work system. 996 is a new requirement for good-paying industries like finance and tech where employees work from 9 am to 9 pm for 6 days a week. Under 996, employees work more than 60 hours a week, a number that is 1.5 times more than the legalized 44 hours a week as stated in article 36 of the Labour Contract Law of the People's Republic of China. Although labor law requires workers to be paid 2.275 times their base salary if they work under the 996 schedule, there are reports that workers are rarely compensated. To highlight their frustration, a number of programmers have created websites like 996.icu and posted a blacklist of companies that encourage an exploitative work culture. Some of the most prominent companies are 58.com, Youzan, JD.com, Alibaba and TikTok's parent company ByteDance. However, neijuan has made entry into these jobs very difficult, and the workers' "greatest fear is perhaps losing what they already have". Many workers, including takeaway drivers, feel like robots who work extremely hard but with no real purpose.

== Responses ==
=== Generation gap ===
The previous generation came of age during the opening up of China's economy, and experienced large social mobility and the creation of markets in many sectors. Xiang Biao points out that people from the previous generation had a more secure childhood and upward mobility. Now that markets in many sectors are largely saturated and social mobility has stagnated, Gen Z does not enjoy the same kind of opportunities.

=== Anticapitalist sentiment ===
The culture that constitutes much of neijuan has engendered anti-capitalist sentiment from the overworked population. The former chief editor of Harper's Bazaar China, Su Mang, called neijuan "the gap between desire and indolence". Su has been lambasted as a "typical capitalist" and forced to apologize. Jack Ma called 996 a "fortune earned through hard work", and was labelled a "bloodsucking capitalist".

=== Migration to the countryside ===
As neijuan is associated with urban lifestyles, one response to it entails re-appreciation of the Chinese countryside as a mentally healthy setting. Linda Qian and Barclay Bram report that urban workers increasingly desire and attempt to migrate to rural areas to combat neijuan, where they often try to establish small-scale businesses.

==== Tangping (lying flat) ====
Tangping, a term that means 'lying flat' or 'giving up on the grind', has also gained a lot of traction. It has been interpreted as a kind of resistance to neijuan, as an exit from competition by renouncing pointless effort. Tangping spawned under stress from overwork and promised a form of resistance to the cycle of exploitation.

=== Government ===
The Chinese government's position on neijuan has been evolving. In the early-2020s, it was largely positive and encouraging, as it is perceived that people working hard will drive up the economy. Resistance to neijuan such as tangping has garnered concern from state media, and some media went as far as to openly condemn tangping. Xu Fang from the University of California, Berkeley proposes that this is a part of the "stability maintenance" effort from the CCP; the government would rather people vent their emotions through online ranting than through a social movement.

In the mid-2020s, the Chinese government took a more critical perspective of neijuan, in terms of excessive competition among manufacturers. This competition has led to significant gluts of various manufactured goods and cutthroat price wars.

== See also ==
- Labor relations in China
- Tang ping – Chinese neologism, "lying flat"
- Abilene paradox – False consensus due to communication failure
- Crab mentality – Metaphor about spiteful attitude
- Rat race – Metaphor for career pursuits and attainment
- Kiasu – Hokkien word for 'fear of losing'
- Karoshi – Sudden death from overwork
- Occupational burnout – Type of occupational stress
- Overwork – Excessive work
