= John K. Fairbank Prize =

Award for history books

The John K. Fairbank Prize in East Asian History is offered annually for an outstanding book in the history of China proper, Vietnam, Chinese Central Asia, Mongolia, Manchuria, Korea, or Japan, substantially after 1800. It honors the late John K. Fairbank, Francis Lee Higginson Professor of History and director of the East Asian Research Center at Harvard University, and president of the American Historical Association in 1968. Only books of high scholarly and literary merit will be considered. Anthologies, edited works, and pamphlets are ineligible for the competition.

== List of prizes ==
Year	Recipient	Title	Publisher
1969	Harold Zvi Schiffrin	Sun Yat-Sen and the Origins of the Chinese Revolution	University of California Press
1969	Tetsuo Najita	Hara Kei in the Politics of Compromise, 1905-1915	Harvard University Press
1971	Jerome B. Grieder	Hu Shih and the Chinese Renaissance: Liberalism in the Chinese Revolution, 1917-37	Harvard University Press
1973	William G. Beasley	The Meiji Restoration	Stanford University Press
1975	Jian Youwen	The Taiping Revolutionary Movement	Yale University Press
1977	Gail Lee Bernstein	Japanese Marxist: A Portrait of Kawakami Hajime, 1879-1946	Harvard University Press
1979	Guy S. Alitto	The Last Confucian: Liang Shu-ming and the Chinese Dilemma of Modernity	University of California Press
1981	Conrad Totman	The Collapse of the Tokugawa Bakufu, 1862-1868	University of Hawaii Press
1983	Bruce Cumings	The Origins of the Korean War: Liberation and the Emergence of Separate Regimes, 1945-47	Princeton University Press
1985	Philip C. Huang	The Peasant Economy and Social Change in North China	Stanford University Press
1986	Carol Gluck	Japan's Modern Myths: Ideology in the Late Meiji Period	Princeton University Press
1987	Joseph W. Esherick	The Origins of the Boxer Uprising	University of California Press
1988	Sheldon Garon	The State and Labor in Modern Japan	University of California Press
1989	Prasenjit Duara	Culture, Power, and the State: Rural North China, 1900-1942	Stanford University Press
1990	Miriam Silverberg	Changing Song: The Marxist Manifestos of Nakano Shigeharu	Princeton University Press
1991	Andrew Gordon	Labor and Imperial Democracy in Prewar Japan	University of California Press
1992	Carter J. Eckert	Offspring of Empire: The Ko-ch'ang Kims and the Colonial Origins of Korean Capitalism, 1876-1945	University of Washington Press
1992	Kathryn Bernhardt	Rents, Taxes, and Peasant Resistance: The Lower Yangzi Region, 1840-1950	Stanford University Press
1993	Elizabeth J. Perry	Shanghai on Strike: The Politics of Chinese Labor	Stanford University Press
1993	Stefan Tanaka	Japan's Orient: Rendering Pasts into History	University of California Press
1994	Kenneth Pomeranz	The Making of a Hinterland: State, Society, and Economy in Inland North China, 1853-1937	University of California Press
1995	Kären Wigen	The Making of Japanese Periphery, 1750-1920	University of California Press
1996	David G. Marr	Vietnam 1945: The Quest for Power	University of California Press
1997	Paul A. Cohen	History in Three Keys: The Boxers as Event, Experience, and Myth	Columbia University Press
1998	Louise Young	Japan's Total Empire: Manchuria and the Culture of Wartime Imperialism	University of California Press
1999	John W. Dower	Embracing Defeat: Japan in the Wake of World War II	W.W. Norton & Co./New Press
2000	Kenneth Pomeranz	The Great Divergence: China, Europe, and the Making of the Modern World Economy	Princeton University Press
2001	Peter Zinoman	The Colonial Bastille: A History of Imprisonment in Vietnam, 1862-1940	University of California Press
2002	Julia Adeney Thomas	Reconfiguring Modernity: Concepts of Nature in Japanese Political Ideology	University of California Press
2003	Norman J. Girardot	The Victorian Translation of China: James Legge's Oriental Pilgrimage	University of California Press
2004	Jordan Sand	House and Home in Modern Japan: Architecture, Domestic Space, and Bourgeois Culture, 1880-1930	Harvard University Asia Center
2005	Ruth Rogaski	Hygienic Modernity: Meanings of Health and Disease in Treaty-port China	University of California Press
2006	Madeleine Zelin	The Merchants of Zigong: Industrial Entrepreneurship in Early Modern China	Columbia University Press
2007	Eugenia Lean	Public Passions: The Trial of Shi Jianqiao and the rise of Popular Sympathy in Republican China	University of California Press
2008	Susan L. Mann	The Talented Women of the Zhang Family	University of California Press
2009	Klaus Mühlhahn	Criminal Justice in China: A History	Harvard University Press
2010	James C. Scott	The Art of Not Being Governed: An Anarchist History of Upland Southeast Asia	Yale University Press
2011	Carol A. Benedict	Golden-Silk Smoke: A History of Tobacco in China, 1550-2010	University of California Press
2012	Jun Uchida	Brokers of Empire: Japanese Settler Colonialism in Korea, 1876-1945	Harvard East Asian Monographs
2013	Barbara Mittler	A Continuous Revolution : Making Sense of Cultural Revolution Culture	Harvard University Asia Center
2014	~~Charles K. Armstrong~~ (Note: Following the discovery of multiple cases of plagiarism and fabricated sources in the book, the American Historical Association initiated an inquiry, after which Charles Armstrong returned the prize to the Association.)	~~Tyranny of the Weak: North Korea and the World, 1950-1992~~	~~Cornell University Press~~
2015	Rian Thum	The Sacred Routes of Uyghur History	Harvard University Press
2016	Barak Kushner	Men to Devils, Devils to Men: Japanese War Crimes and Chinese Justice	Harvard University Press
2017	Christopher Goscha	Vietnam: A New History	Basic Books
2018	Thomas S. Mullaney	The Chinese Typewriter: A History	MIT Press
2019	Chris Courtney	The Nature of Disaster in China: The 1931 Yangzi River Flood	Cambridge University Press
2020	Eiichiro Azuma	In Search of Our Frontier: Japanese America and Settler Colonialism in the Construction of Japan’s Borderless Empire	University of California Press
2021	Eric Schluessel	Land of Strangers: The Civilizing Project in Qing Central Asia	Columbia University Press
2022	Hwasook B. Nam	Women in the Sky: Gender and Labor in the Making of Modern Korea	Cornell University Press
2023	H. Yumi Kim	Madness in the Family: Women, Care, and Illness in Japan	Oxford University Press
2024	Tristan G. Brown	Laws of the Land: Fengshui and the State in Qing Dynasty China	Princeton University Press
2025	Matthew H. Sommer	The Fox Spirit, the Stone Maiden, and Other Transgender Histories from Late Imperial China	Columbia University Press
2026	Joan Judge	The Politics of Common Reading: Vernacular Knowledge and Everyday Technics in China, 1894-1954	University of Chicago Press

== See also ==
- Joseph Levenson Book Prize for Chinese history.
- John Whitney Hall Book Prize for Japanese or Korean history.
- James B. Palais Book Prize for Korean history.
- List of history awards
- List of prizes named after people
