= M. Crawford Young =

American political scientist (1931–2020)

- Born: November 7, 1931
- Died: January 22, 2020 (aged 88)
- Education: University of Michigan; Harvard University
- Occupations: Political scientist, college professor
- Employer: University of Wisconsin-Madison
- Organization(s): African Studies Association (president, 1983)
- Notable work: The Politics of Cultural Pluralism (1976)
- Spouse: Rebecca Young
- Children: 4, including Louise Young
- Parent: Louise Merwin Young
- Relatives: Serge Dedina (son-in-law)

Merwin Crawford Young (November 7, 1931 – January 22, 2020) was an American political scientist and professor at the University of Wisconsin–Madison.

== Education ==
He received his B.A. from the University of Michigan and his PhD from Harvard in 1964, where his advisor was the famed scholar Rupert Emerson, the only person ever to serve as president of both the African Studies Association and the Asian Studies Association.

== Academic career ==
Young became an assistant professor at Wisconsin in 1963, and published his first major work, Politics in the Congo: Decolonization and Independence. He became prominent as the author in 1976 of the highly influential The Politics of Cultural Pluralism, which was awarded the Herskovits Prize by the African Studies Association. His 1994 book, The African Colonial State in Comparative Perspective, won the Lubbert Prize from the American Political Science Association as the best book written that year in the field of Comparative Politics.

He held chairmanship of the UW–Madison political science department twice (1969–72; 1984–87), and was between 1973 and 1975 Dean of the Faculty of Social Science at the Université Nationale du Zaire. Young served as president of the African Studies Association in 1983. He retired in 2001 as a full professor but remained active in his field, publishing "The End of the Postcolonial State in Africa?" in the journal African Affairs in 2004.

Young's primary contributions to political science have come from his work on the Zairian (and later, African) state and on the politics of cultural identity in the third world, which was theoretically innovative and presaged the contemporary "instrumentalist" and "constructivist" approaches to political identity.

== Select publications ==
- Politics in the Congo: Decolonization and Independence, 1965
- Issues of Political Development (with Charles Anderson and Fred von der Mehden), 1967
- The Politics of Cultural Pluralism, 1976, University of Wisconsin Press
- Cooperatives and Development: Agricultural Politics in Ghana and Uganda (with Neal Sherman and Tim Rose), 1981
- Ideology and Development in Africa, 1982, Yale University Press
- The Rise and Decline of the Zairian State (with Thomas Turner), 1985, University of Wisconsin Press
- The Rising Tide of Cultural Pluralism: The Nation-State at Bay?, 1993, University of Wisconsin Press
- The African Colonial State in Comparative Perspective, 1994, Yale University Press
- The Postcolonial State in Africa: Fifty Years of Independence, 1960–2010, 2012, University of Wisconsin Press

== See also ==
- Lewis H. Gann, American political scientist focused on Africa and active in the 1960s and 1970s
