= Louise Merwin Young =

American college professor

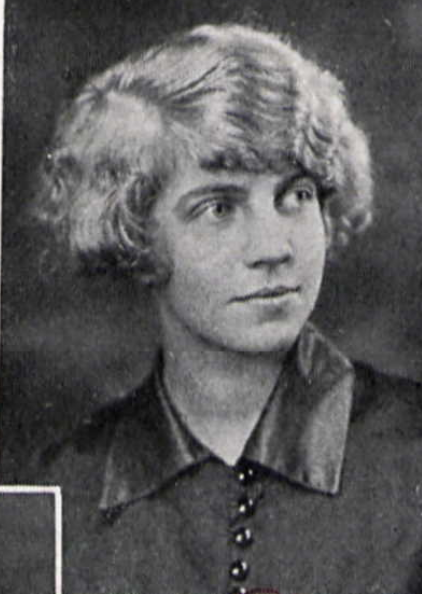
- Louise Merwin, from the 1926 yearbook of Ohio State University
- Born: Louise Merwin; September 5, 1903; East Palestine, Ohio, U.S.
- Died: August 9, 1992 (aged 88); Redlands, California, U.S.
- Occupations: Educator, writer, lecturer
- Known for: Work with national and international women's organizations
- Children: 3, including M. Crawford Young
- Relatives: Louise Young (granddaughter); Rebecca Young (daughter-in-law)

Louise Merwin Young (September 5, 1903 – August 9, 1992) was an American writer and lecturer, active in international women's rights work and in the League of Women Voters (LWV). She wrote three books and taught at American University.

== Early life and education ==
Merwin was born in East Palestine, Ohio, the daughter of Charles Lewis Merwin and Estella Dora Meek Merwin. Her father was a banker, a school superintendent, and a newspaper publisher. She had five brothers, including Richard E. Merwin, a prominent computer engineer.

She graduated from Ohio Wesleyan University in 1925, and earned a master's degree and a Ph.D. in English literature at the University of Pennsylvania in 1929 and 1938, respectively, culminating her studies with a dissertation on Thomas Carlyle.

== Career ==
Young was vice president of the Pennsylvania League of Women Voters, and attended the 1944 national convention of the LWV. She began working for the national LWV after moving to Washington, D.C., organizing the league's files for preservation by the Library of Congress. She was also an officer of the American Association of University Women (AAUW), the Foreign Policy Association, and the National PTA.

From 1946 to 1948, Young was executive vice-chair of the National Committee on the Status of Women, and represented the International Alliance of Women at United Nations conferences in the 1940s. In 1947, she edited a special journal issue of the Annals of the American Academy of Political and Social Science, on women's citizenship. She taught English at American University, and lectured nationally. She was a delegate to the International Political Science Association Congress held at the Hague in 1952.

== Publications ==
- Thomas Carlyle and the Art of History (1939)
- Understanding Politics: A Practical Guide for Women (1950)
- In the Public Interest: The League of Women Voters, 1920–1970 (1989)

== Personal life ==
Merwin married economist Ralph Aubrey Young in 1925. He was director of the Division of Research at the Federal Reserve Board. They had three children; one was political scientist M. Crawford Young. One of her granddaughters is historian Louise Young. Another granddaughter, Emily Young, is an executive at the Prebys Foundation, and married to environmentalist and politician Serge Dedina.

Young died in 1992, at the age of 88, in Redlands, California. Her papers are in the Schlesinger Library at Harvard University.
