= Metageography =

Quebec province topographic map with census cities

Metageography is a term used by Martin W. Lewis and Kären E. Wigen's 1997 The Myth of Continents: A Critique of Metageography, which analyzes metageographical constructs such as "East", "West", "Europe", "Asia", "North" or "South". which they define as "the set of spatial structures through which people order their knowledge of the world" Geographies, wrote one reviewer, are thus much more than just the ways in which societies are stretched across the Earth's surface. They also include the "contested, arbitrary, power-laden, and often inconsistent ways in which those structures are represented epistemologically."

In an interview, Lewis explained: "By 'metageography' I mean the relatively unexamined and often taken-for-granted spatial frameworks through which knowledge is organized within all fields of the social sciences and humanities." He added that "the distinction between the merely geographical and the metageographical is not always clear-cut.

The term was criticized by James M. Blaut: "the word metageography seems to have been coined by the authors as an impressive-sounding synonym for 'world cultural geography.'" Lewis and Wigen, however, disagreed, arguing that every consideration of human affairs employs a metageography as a structuring force on one's conception of the world

In 1969, Soviet geographers Gokhman, Gurevich and Saushkin wrote that "[m]etageography is concerned with study of the common basis of geographical regularities and the potentialities of geography as a science" and argued that many factors must be taken into account in order to define geographical entities, not simply spatial ones.
