= Agricultural Involution =

1963 book by Clifford Geertz

Agricultural Involution: The Processes of Ecological Change in Indonesia
- Cover page of 1st edition published in 1963
- Author: Clifford Geertz
- Language: English
- Published: 1963
- Publisher: University of California Press
- Publication place: United States
- ISBN: 978-0-520-00459-7

Agricultural Involution: The Processes of Ecological Change in Indonesia is one of the most famous of the early works of Clifford Geertz. Its principal thesis is that many centuries of intensifying wet-rice cultivation in Indonesia had produced greater social complexity without significant technological or political change, a process Geertz terms involution.

== Content ==
Written for a particular US-funded project on the local developments and following the modernisation theory of Walt Whitman Rostow, Geertz examines in this book the agricultural system in Indonesia. The two dominant forms of agriculture are swidden and sawah. Swidden is also known as slash and burn and sawah involves irrigated rice paddies. The geographical location of these different types is important. Sawah is the dominant form in both Java and Bali where nearly three-quarters of Indonesia's population live, and swidden is more common in the less central regions.

Having looked at the agricultural system, the book turns to an examination of the system's historical development. Of particular note is Geertz's discussion of what he famously describes as the process of "agricultural involution". This is his description of the process in Java where both the external economic demands of the Dutch rulers and the internal pressures due to population growth led to intensification rather than change. What this amounted to was increasing the labour intensity in the paddies, increasing output per area but not per head. In his book, Geertz credits the term to Alexander Goldenweiser:

I borrowed the concept of involution from the American anthropologist Alexander Goldenweiser. He had used it to describe cultural forms - Gothic architecture, Maori carvings - that, having reached a definitive form, continued to develop by becoming internally more complicated. Here, I attempted to explain how such increasing internal complexity had taken place in the sedentary wet rice agriculture as opposed to the dry rice shifting cultivation regimes in the rest of Indonesia.

The book has three sections:

- I Starting Points, Theoretical And Factual with two Chapters 1. The Ecological Approach In Anthropology Chapter 2. Two Types Of Ecosystems
- II The Crystallization Of The Pattern Chapter 3. The Classical Period; Chapter 4. The Colonial Period: Foundations; Chapter 5 The Colonial Period: Florescence
- III The Outcome: Chapter 6. Comparisons And Prospects

== Critics ==
This was politically the most controversial text of Geertz as the Modjokuto Project (1953-1959) was a CIA-funded program for CENIS at MIT. However, in an interview with David Price Geertz asserted that he was not involved with the political side of the project. Late in his career, Geertz reflected that the book had become an "orphan," widely read and criticized without reference to his larger body of work.

== In popular culture ==
The term involution was introduced to social sciences research about China in the 1985 book The peasant economy and social change in North China by Philip C. C. Huang at UCLA, in which he uses it to explain why family farming, rather than industrial agriculture, dominates the agriculture in North China. The term is again used in Prasenjit Duara's 1988 book Culture, Power, and the State: Rural North China, 1900-1942, where Duara describes an involution of the state in the forms of its rural government. Since then, the term involution has drawn great attention in China.

== Chinese usage of involution (neijuan) ==
The term involution neijuan, has drawn significant attention in Chinese sociological research, making it one of the most popular terms for describing youth culture there. Since Covid-19, the term has been gradually extended to be used to describe a variety of aspects of the highly competitive Chinese society. In 2020, it became one of the most popular buzzwords on Weibo, where it is used to describe the feeling of exhaustion in an overly competitive society.
