= Alexander Goldenweiser =

Alexander Goldenweiser may refer to:

- Alexander Goldenweiser (anthropologist) (1880–1940), American anthropologist
- Alexander Goldenweiser (composer) (1875–1961), Russian composer, pianist and teacher
