= Charles K. Armstrong =

American Koreanist (born 1962)

Charles King Armstrong (born February 11, 1962) is an American historian of North Korea. From 2005 to 2020, he worked as the Korea Foundation Professor of Korean Studies at Columbia University, spending his last year on sabbatical after the university's determination that he had committed extensive plagiarism. Armstrong's works dealt with revolutions, cultures of socialism, architectural history, and diplomatic history in the contexts of East Asia and modern Korea, with a focus on North Korea.

His 2013 book, Tyranny of the Weak, won the John K. Fairbank Prize, but he returned it in 2017 after the American Historical Association asked him to account for issues with the citations, including plagiarism and source fabrication. He was investigated by Columbia in 2020 relating to rape accusations from a student, where he was found guilty of "harassment" and violating school policy prohibiting sexual relations of professors with students. He left Columbia in June 2020.

== Early life ==
Armstrong earned his B.A. in Chinese Studies (having transferred from East Asian studies during his first year) at Yale University in 1984, and continued his studies for two years at Yonsei University in Seoul, earning a diploma in Korean language in 1986. He next spent a year in Northeast China teaching English at Jilin University and then went on to study for an M.Sc. at the London School of Economics in 1988. He earned his Ph.D. in Korean Studies at the University of Chicago in 1994 under Bruce Cumings, a noted historian of Korean Studies.

== Career ==
Charles Armstrong is a specialist in the modern history of Korea and East Asia, and has written or edited numerous books on modern and contemporary Korea as well as the wider East Asia region (including Vietnam and Japan) and the Cold War.

He joined the Columbia faculty in 1996 and before leaving in 2020, taught courses on Korean history, U.S.-East Asian relations, the Vietnam War, and approaches to international and global history.

His book The North Korean Revolution, 1945–1950, published in 2003, was based largely on captured North Korean documents in the U.S. National Archives, and was a step forward for efforts to understand North Korea more at the local level and beyond more conventional Cold War or Korean War-centered approaches. He has published articles in peer-reviewed journals on such subjects as Kim Il Sung's Manchurian guerrilla heritage, the "cultural Cold War" in Korea, and assessments of North Korean studies as a whole.

He was a visiting professor in 2008 at the Graduate School of International Studies at Seoul National University, has given keynote lectures at major Asian studies conferences, and is a regular fixture in US media coverage of the Korean peninsula, including documentary film and television.

== Plagiarism and source fabrication in Tyranny of the Weak ==
In 2013, Charles Armstrong's book Tyranny of the Weak: North Korea and the World, 1950–1992 was published by Cornell University Press. The book sought to reassess North Korean foreign policy in the Cold War. The book received positive reviews, particularly because it appeared to draw from so many foreign archives and materials in multiple languages including Russian, Chinese, German, and Korean. The book was the 2014 winner of the John K. Fairbank Prize, given to the best book in East Asian History by the American Historical Association.

Beginning in September 2016, the book was severely criticized by a number of North Korea scholars (Andrei Lankov, Balázs Szalontai, Brian Myers, Fyodor Tertitskiy and others) for deceptive scholarship. Szalontai asserted that many parts of the text closely resemble text in his own Kim Il Sung in the Khrushchev Era and were supported by documents that either did not exist or were completely unrelated to the subject. Szalontai compiled a table of 76 problematic cases and later expanded the table to include 90 of such cases.

Soon after the allegations were made public, Armstrong responded to NK News that he "did not comment on any specific issues critics have raised with the book". On December 30, 2016, Armstrong directly addressed the issues raised by the critics, stating: "For those who find the book flawed, inaccurate or insufficiently researched, the answer is simple: write a better book." Armstrong stated that he had submitted 52 corrections to Tyranny of the Weak to the publisher Cornell University Press and these would be included in the next printing of the book. The press confirmed this with a single tweet on January 11, 2017, saying "Charles Armstrong responds to critics, issues corrections to Tyranny of the Weak" and linking to Armstrong's blog post. However, Armstrong later deleted the post and his entire blog.

In June 2017, Armstrong returned the John King Fairbank Prize to the American Historical Association in response to critical queries made by the association. In its press release, the association stated that they had "identified a set of citations that did not meet professional standards" and that "Dr. Armstrong has corrected the citation errors and, out of respect for the AHA, has returned the Fairbank Prize." Columbia University made no statement at this time, but did announce on June 1 that Armstrong had been awarded a 2017 President's Global Innovation Fund Grant for work with Joseph Terwilliger on exchanges with North Korean physicians.

The return of the prize prompted the head of Cornell University Press to state in early July 2017 that the press would imminently issue a revised edition of the book. The new edition of the book appeared in the summer of 2017, without any formal announcement from the press. The new text contained few changes to the prose, but did feature changes to dozens of footnotes now citing Szalontai's Kim Il Sung in the Khrushchev Era rather than archival documents. It also included two new sentences from Armstrong in the front matter of the text: "I would like to add a special note of thanks to Dr. Balázs Szalontai, whose pioneering research was insufficiently acknowledged in the prior printing of this book and who pointed out to me numerous attribution errors in chapters 2 and 3. I apologize for my previous oversights and gratefully acknowledge Dr. Szalontai's assistance in correcting these errors."

A short review of the controversy was published in a collective blog Retraction Watch. It was also covered by South Korean media, Chinese media, and the New York Post.

In an extensive interview in December 2019, Szalontai revealed that Armstrong had not worked in any Russian archives at all, and said "some of the East German sources [in Tyranny of the Weak] are fake, some are not fake," and further discussed some of the efforts by Andrei Lankov and other scholars to methodically check Armstrong's suspicious sources.

In February 2020, Armstrong's 2005 article: "'Fraternal Socialism': The International Reconstruction of North Korea, 1953–62", published in the journal Cold War History, was retracted for plagiarism from Szalontai's book.

=== Columbia University's investigation ===
On September 10, 2019, Columbia University released a letter to faculty explaining that it had concluded a multi-part formal investigation of Armstrong's research conduct and determined that he had committed plagiarism. It further announced that Armstrong would retire at the end of 2020. He left the university in June 2020.

According to documents obtained by journalists Khadija Hussein and Karen Xia, Columbia's investigation concluded in January 2019 and its scope extended back to Armstrong's tenure file submitted in 2003. That tenure file included draft chapters of what would ultimately become Armstrong's book Tyranny of the Weak. According to Balázs Szalontai, who obtained a copy of the investigation's draft report in 2018, the investigation found evidence in the tenure file that Armstrong had plagiarized Szalontai's dissertation. A partial copy of an earlier draft of Columbia's investigation report was made public by the Retraction Watch website on September 20, 2019.

== Sexual assault accusation ==
A female student enrolled in Armstrong's 2014 Global Scholars summer course accused Armstrong of rape in 2020. According to the university's student newspaper Columbia Spectator, Armstrong responded that the sex was consensual. Columbia University's Office of Equal Opportunity and Affirmative Action conducted an internal investigation of the accusation and found Armstrong guilty of harassment and of violating the university policy prohibiting relationships between professors and students.

== Selected works ==
Monographs

- 2017 — Tyranny of the Weak: North Korea and the World, 1950–1992 (first edition "reprinted with corrections") Withdrawn by the publisher, Cornell University Press.
- 2013 — Tyranny of the Weak: North Korea and the World, 1950–1992
- 2006 — The Koreas (reissued in 2013/14)
- 2003 — The North Korean Revolution, 1945-1950

=== Edited volumes and textbooks ===
- 2005 — Korea at the Center: Dynamics of Regionalism in Northeast Asia (co-edited with Samuel S. Kim, Stephen Kotkin and Gilbert Rozman)
- 2002 — Korean Society: Civil Society, Democracy, and the State (textbook, reissued in 2006)

=== Articles and book chapters ===
- 2015 — "Socialist Postmodernism: Conceptual and comparative analysis of recent representative architecture in Pyongyang, Astana and Ashgabat, 1989–2014,"Tiempo devorado: revista de historia actual, Vol.2 (2), pp. 98–118 (article; co-authored with Jelena Prokopljevic)
- "The Destruction and Reconstruction of North Korea, 1950 – 1960," Japan Focus (article)
- 2005 — "'Fraternal Socialism': The International Reconstruction of North Korea, 1953–61," Cold War History May 2005, Vol.5(2), pp. 161–187 (article; retracted by the journal on February 10, 2020, due to the author's 'fabrication and falsification of sources')
- 1998 — "'A Socialism of Our Style': North Korean Ideology in a Post-Communist Era," in North Korean Foreign Relations in the post-Cold War Era (book chapter; editor: Samuel S. Kim)
- 1990 — "South Korea's 'Northern policy'," in Pacific Review, Vol.3(1), pp. 35–45 (article)

=== Working papers ===
- 2011 – "'Juche' and North Korea's Global Aspirations," North Korea International Documentation Project Working Paper #1
- 1994 – "The Origins and Future Demise of the Democratic People's Republic of Korea," Norman Paterson School of International Affairs, Carleton University, 11 p. (working paper)

=== Ph.D. thesis ===
- 1994 — State and Social Transformation in North Korea, 1945–1950 (University of Chicago)

== Honors ==
- 1991 – 2 Fulbright IIEE Research Grant
- 2000 – Fulbright Senior Scholar Research Grant.
- 2002 – German Academic Exchange Grant, Humboldt University, Berlin
- 2006 – Fellow in Residence, Institute for Scholars at Reid Hall, Paris
- 2008 – Toyota Fellow, Seoul National University
- 2014 – John King Fairbank Prize, American Historical Association (returned)
