= Miriam Silverberg =

American historian (1951–2008)

- Born: January 19, 1951; Washington, D.C., U.S.
- Died: March 16, 2008 (aged 57); Los Angeles, California, U.S.
- Occupation: Historian
- Awards: John K. Fairbank Prize (1990); Guggenheim Fellow (1993)

Academic background
- Education: American University; Georgetown University; University of Chicago
- Thesis: Changing song: the Marxist poetry of Nakano Shigeharu (1984)

Academic work
- Discipline: History of Japan
- Institutions: Hamilton College; University of California, Los Angeles

Miriam Silverberg (January 19, 1951 – March 16, 2008) was an American historian. A 1993 Guggenheim Fellow, she was author of Changing Song: The Marxist Manifestos of Nakano Shigeharu (1990) and Erotic Grotesque Nonsense (2007), winning the 1990 John K. Fairbank Prize for the former. A professor at the University of California, Los Angeles, she was director of UCLA's Center for the Study of Women from 2000 to 2003.

== Biography ==
Silverberg was born on January 19, 1951, in Washington, D.C. Her father later moved to the Embassy of the United States, Tokyo to become a labor attaché there, and she was raised in that city as a youth; she attended International School of the Sacred Heart in Shibuya. She obtained her BA at American University in 1977 and her MA at Georgetown University in 1979, before obtaining a PhD in Japanese history from the University of Chicago in 1984. Her doctoral dissertation was titled Changing song: the Marxist poetry of Nakano Shigeharu.

After working at Hamilton College as an assistant professor of history since 1987, Silverberg moved to the University of California, Los Angeles in 1989. She was promoted to associate professor in 1992, before being eventually promoted to full professor. She served as the director of UCLA's Center for the Study of Women from 2000 to 2003. In 2005, she retired early from UCLA after being diagnosed with cancer and Parkinson's disease, and she became a professor emerita.

Silverberg won the 1990 John K. Fairbank Prize for her book Changing Song: The Marxist Manifestos of Nakano Shigeharu (1990). Two of her 1991 essays, according to Sabine Frühstück, "put the modern girl on the scholarly map" and marked the beginning of a dedicated academic subfield. In 1993, she was awarded a Guggenheim Fellowship to study Japanese modernity. In 2006, she published her final book Erotic Grotesque Nonsense, focusing on pre-World War II Japan, completing it "with the help of former students and friends" while ill. The Los Angeles Times said that "Silverberg's scholarship is often required reading for those studying modern Japan". Among her influences were Harry Harootunian, Shozo Fujita, Tetsuo Najita, and John W. Witek.

Silverberg was an editorial board member for the journal Japanese Studies. She was keynote speaker for a 1998 Japanese culture symposium at the Art Gallery of New South Wales.

Silverberg died at Kindred Hospital in Los Angeles on March 16, 2008, from complications with Parkinson's disease; she was 57.

Silverberg had a brother. She was also fluent in Japanese, having been raised in the country during her youth.

== Bibliography ==
- Changing Song: The Marxist Manifestos of Nakano Shigeharu (1990)
- Erotic Grotesque Nonsense (2006)
