= Erotic Grotesque Nonsense =

2007 book by Miriam Silverberg

- Author: Miriam Silverberg
- Language: English
- Series: Asia Pacific Modern
- Subject: Interwar period in Japan
- Genre: History
- Publisher: University of California Press
- Publication date: April 2007
- Publication place: United States
- ISBN: 9780520260085
- OCLC: 609850130

Erotic Grotesque Nonsense is a 2007 book by historian Miriam Silverberg. It focuses on Japanese modern culture in the interwar period, specifically from the 1920s until the attack on Pearl Harbor, and argues that ero guro nansensu was a challenge to Japanese imperialist ideology. The book received praise in the academic community for its informativity and detail, but was criticized for leaving several knowledge gaps open or using a "montage in motion" perspective to organize its contents.

== Contents ==
Erotic Grotesque Nonsense focuses on Japanese modern culture from the 1920s until the 1941 attack on Pearl Harbor that sent the country into war with the United States. The argument presented throughout the book is that ero guro nansensu, a broad range of cultural trends within the country, functioned as a challenge to the Japanese imperial ideology of kokkashugi and expansionism. It is divided into three parts: "Japanese Modern Times", "Japanese Modern Sites", and "Asakusa: Honky Tonk Tempo".

"Japanese Modern Times" explores how words related to "modern" operated in the setting, including how Japanese people explored modernization and how Japanese academics' contemporary studies on Japanese society played a role in modernizing the country. It also explores the country's montage culture, as well as the "documentary impulse" prevalent in the book's discussion of modern Japan.

"Japanese Modern Sites" examines the changes shown in modern culture. The chapter on the modern girl, which was inspired by an essay she wrote in 1991, cements them as symbols of modernity, while the cafe' waitress is cited as another example of modern change. Regarding media impact, the magazines Eiga no Tomo and Shufu no Tomo are used as a case study with respect to their impact on modern culture change, in addition to the extensive use of media sources instead of autobiographical ones.

"Asakusa: Honky Tonk Tempo" centers on the role of Tokyo neighborhood Asakusa in modern culture, particularly by exploring it through the three parts of the titular concept. She explores the ero/erotic side of Asakusa through the work of Yasunari Kawabata and Soeda Azenbō, saying that the area (in Sabine Frühstück's words) "could be defined by sensation, food, motion, and vision"; the guro/grotesque side with the neighborhood's beggars and vagabonds; and the nansensu/nonsense side by exploring the Japanese trend of "nonsense movies".

Silverberg uses a nonlinear "montage in motion" perspective to organize the book's contents, which she compares to the topic era's avant-garde montage technique and describes as "a series of moments and images that can be reordered in numerous ways to reorient us".

== Background and release ==
Erotic Grotesque Nonsense was an extension of Silverberg's academic work on Japanese culture in the 1920s and 1930s, with Alisa Freedman calling it "a compilation album of extended versions of her previously published articles, connected and contextualised with new essays serving as liner notes". Prior to the book's creation, Silverberg had written two essays which Frühstück said "put the modern girl on the scholarly map" and kickstarted an academic field on the subject, eventually resulting in an edited volume titled The Modern Girl Around the World: Consumption, Modernity, and Globalization.

Erotic Grotesque Nonsense was released by University of California Press as an eBook in April 2007, with the paperback version released in June 2009. It is part of the UC Press' Asia Pacific Modern series, as well as the Philip E. Lilienthal Imprint in Asian Studies. The book's title comes from the wasei-eigo phrase ero guro nansensu.

Sheila Levine worked on the book as Silverberg's editor, while Erika Büky worked as copy-editor. Funding was provided by the John Simon Guggenheim Memorial Foundation and the National Endowment for the Humanities. This was one of the last works completed by Silverberg before her death on March 16, 2008. She had completed it "with the help of former students and friends" while ill.

== Reception ==
Jeffrey Angles said that "given the sophistication and detail of this book, there is much in Silverberg's research to admire", citing the information debunking the idea that popular culture and the Japanese colonial empire were unconnected. Freedman noted that the book "teaches the significance of mass culture [and] exemplifies how history should be written." Frühstück said of the book: "Her sensitivity to the intellectual, textual, emotional, and particularly the visual character of the mass culture of Japanese modern times has set an example for us all".

Kim Brandt noted that "there is a remarkable openness and generosity to this sort of history writing", saying that "Silverberg offers us her sources [...] in a manner that allows us not only to follow her arguments, but also to query them." Louise Young also called it an "excellent book [which] leaves the reader with much food for thought". Dolores P. Martinez praised the book "an exciting and important work, a life's work", calling it "proof of [Silverberg's] passionate engagement with the history of Japan", but criticized the copy-editing.

Frühstück, Martinez and Young criticized the montage technique for creating a disunified epilogue or weakening the book's ability to structure its arguments. Brandt said that Silverberg left aspects on modern culture open to interpretation, such as its Western and urban nature, as well as evidence for both sides of the trend's timeframes; Angles also thought similarly, noting that the author did not address the titular phrase's elevation to the era's studies or its subsequent attachment of nansensu.
