= Prized Possessions =

1952 short story by Yasuoka Shōtarō

"Prized Possessions" (愛玩, Aigan) is a short story written by Yasuoka Shōtarō in 1952. It was translated into English by Edwin McClellan and published in a volume entitled Contemporary Japanese Literature in 1977. The text is highly allegorical as it serves as a commentary on the dialectical forces present in the reconstruction of Japanese society in the wake of its postwar period. In doing so, the story constantly alludes to the reversal of conventional Japanese values and gender roles occurring at the time.

== Content ==
Setting

- The “house,“ the only physical setting in the story.

Main Characters

- Son: The narrator “I“ who suffers from Pott's disease, which he got during the war.
- Father: A traumatic and pathetic man who grows obsessed with his rabbits.
- Mother: The backbone of her household who initiates the sale of Father's rabbits.

Supporting Characters

- Father's acquaintance
- Mother's guest

=== Plot ===
The story begins with the speaker's groaning and cynical comment on "poverty," in which he redefines it as something highly substantial than what many people consider it to be, something "that clings to you" (111). As the narrator "I" goes on to describe the unfavorable circumstances surrounding his family, his critical attitude toward the family and contemporary Japanese society stands out. In his view, both units of the community seem to lack the "capacity to manage its affairs" with weakening patriarchal figures (111). As a result, there is now an unmistakable sign of havoc in every corner of the house, the "whirlpool of rubbish" (112). Yet another disorderly factor arrives to the house after "one of Father’s former subordinate officers" visits him one day (112). In defiance of postwar trauma that has prevented him from leaving the house, Father, dressed up and gone out the next morning, brings home rabbits.

As time progresses, the protagonist sees disorder and annoyance in these animals and is often disturbed by their enervating sound. His parents, on the other hand, find delight and hope, undoubting that the rabbits would earn them "eight thousand yen a month" (112). As Father's devotion to the rabbits and their babies—though it initially infuses some kind of meaning into his life—grows into an obsession, the "I" starts to perceive the impact of such transformation. More than often, the son feels the need to secure his "plates" and "hair" in fear of having them taken away by Father for the sake of "those disgusting creatures," and the Mother also starts to nurse the babies rather ‘maternally’ (115; 116; 112). Only after the house has turned into a dirty hutch, and she sells her own clothes to provide their food, does Mother realize that the household is overwhelmed by their presence and make an arrangement with the "meat buyer" (117). As the man pedals away his bicycle after a brief encounter with the family members, the story ends with the family members watching him in silence.

== Narratology ==
Narrative Structure: "Prized Possessions" is presented from the perspective of a young, immature male whom we can refer to as "I." The narrative's tone is both bitter and melancholy—especially towards the Father, as well as apathetic. Though not indicated in the English translation, the narrator uses boku to refer to himself in the original Japanese text, a pronoun used to indicate ‘I' among young males. Even though the narrator feels resentful towards his father as well as skeptical about his scheme to make yards of cloth and earn money with the rabbits, he seems to comply with the rest of the family in the end.

Literary Devices

- Allusion: The sound of rabbits, "chu, chu," which appears frequently throughout the text, evokes the Hirohito surrender broadcast when the Emperor's speech was broadcast on the radio for the first time in Japanese history. This "strange," "futile" and "profoundly disappointing" cry explicitly alludes to the emotion the Japanese nation would have really felt when they heard the Emperor's voice on the radio (113). As the "I" explains in the next sentence, rabbits make such sound for fear of danger from burglars and stray dogs, which also seems to underline the contemporary, new victimization of Japanese people of themselves as a result of the war.
- Juxtaposition: The juxtaposition in this text chiefly serves to create the sense of disorder predominating the house on multiple levels. The precise "kind of confusion" in the character's perspective is materialized and realized through the list of Father's rather meaningless possessions: "his veterinarian’s saw, scalpel, glass fragments, seeds of unusual plants, his old rank badges, khaki-colored thread wound around a leather bobbin, and so on" (111; 112). Most of these items are identifiable only with Father's past as "a professional soldier;" in fact, Father seems to think "as though he were still at the front" (111). In other words, this juxtaposition of practically useless items reinforces, very effectively, the stuffiness that fills the house's physical space, as well as Father's traumatic state which hinders him from adapting to the Japanese postwar period.
- Irony (Humor): As the story progresses, Father starts to resemble the rabbits he so frantically cares about. The narrator, at one point, says that his father eats his food by "biting with his front teeth," causing the narrator to think "of him as being one of [the rabbits]" (115). Initially the rabbits are a means of producing wealth for the family, but they rather seem to produce "confusion" on everyone (111). Father also starts to mirror the habits of the animals so closely that his initial plan to use them as an economic means becomes even more unattainable than before. The irony in the reversal of the primary functions of the characters and means, made all the more humorous by the vivid mergence of Father and his rabbits, is one literary device in the text.

== Themes ==
The ‘Ego’: The ego and psychology of the narrator exist as the central progressive drive of the story. The disorder and insecurity that exist within the narrator's mind reflect the increased distancing between the previously ideologically uniform identity of Japan and that of the post-war Japanese individual. At one point in the story, the narrator describes a paranoid fantasy in which his father is watching over him in the night and eyeing his hair. In this scene he claims that "it was easy to fall into wondering whether [he] had not become one of themーone of those stupid, timid, yet shameless animals" (117). The term them is very ambiguous, as it is not clear as to whether he is questioning whether he is starting to exhibit the psychotic symptoms of his parents, or whether he is comparing himself to the rabbits that are populating his household. In doing either, the narrator is severely contemplating the nature of his self, in addition to his own mental health. This moment of inwardness draws away from him strictly observing the chaos that surrounds him, in order to briefly reflect on whether this chaos has taken its toll on his own psychology. This highly allegorical scene appears to mirror the reshaping of Japanese identity following the war.

Japan as Matriarchal society: As Emperor Shōwa broadcast the Ningen-sengen, ‘Humanity Declaration,’ in 1946, the already weakening image of male authority in the postwar period had completely demolished. Rather naturally the scope of the mother figure's role expanded as opposed to that of fathers, especially on the domestic level. Considering that it is Mother who brings "visitor" in order to put an end to the chaos, she is implied as the newly arising matriarchal figure in the household, though not necessarily a daunting figure (117). Set in a small house filled with rabbits and flying furs, this short story exposes the psyche of a presumably adolescent boy struggling to comprehend such abrupt shift in gender-power dynamics.

The Dissolving of Masculinity: The presumed patriarchal figures are rather reclining and even psychopathic in certain scenes of the novel. Thus "I" in the story suddenly loses an exemplary figure embodying male ideals and power, which is more or less crucial in the development of a self-identity, even more so during the time of national identity confusion. In the end, the character merges with his father, together letting their masculinity and authority dissolve away.

Reshaping of the Japanese Identity: Along with the resignation of the Emperor, the postwar circumstances quickly reoriented the nation's view of itself. Used to believing in divine care, the Japanese people for the first time felt their vulnerability to other authorities in the world. Subsequently, men who had become incompetent due to postwar trauma were by no means rare. "Prized Possession" is in a way a very detailed illustration of how such national incompetence was reflected in domestic settings.

== Motifs ==
Oedipus Complex: Despite many controversies, there are some instances where "I" indirectly reveals a sexual desire for his mother, as well as jealousy and anger towards his father. This is perhaps the result of his father's incompetence, "I" appears to be competing with his father over the possession and attention of his mother. Throughout the story, the narrator does not directly express his wish to possess his mother or replace his father. For instance, he considers his Mother as his "constant bedside companion" (115) He then goes on to describe her body in detail: "Her belly and face got quite round, and her legs, peeping out of the open folds of her kimono, were as plump as a child’s" (116). Mother would often imagine and describe a future bride for "I," yet the "I" claims that "this imaginary bride she was describing invariably became none other than herself" (116). Even though the age of the narrator is not indicated in the story, because the Oedipus complex occurs in the phallic stage when young males form their sexual identity, the readers can assume or roughly estimate the age of "I." After the phallic stage, young males seek for a woman like their mothers while becoming heterosexual and forming their sexual identities.

Psychosis: All three members of the household are in a state of mental decline. The entire story revolves around the father's futile quest to yield yarn from rabbit fur in order to sell it. In turn, he devotes all of his time, energy and affection into the rabbits. At one point in the story the narrator scolds his father for his useless efforts in which his father replies: "So what! What if it is a waste of time" (113). Due to his unhealthy state of mind, the father lacks any sort of sense of priority and instead devotes all of his efforts into the rabbits. It is overtly clear that his perception of reality is skewed. Even though the father and the mother seem to display symptoms like this most obviously, we see a vast array of psychotic symptoms manifested in the narrator as well. Furthermore, it is implied that his own psychotic symptoms are the result of him observing his parents’ behaviour. This is apparent when he describes the sounds of his father's labor as "meaningless energy" that finds “its way through [his] skull and into [his] brain, leaving no room for anything else“ (113). In the wake of observing his own parents go mad, the symptoms start to manifest themselves in him through his constant fear and irritability.
