= The Myth of Continents: A Critique of Metageography =

1997 book by Martin W. Lewis and Kären E. Wigen

The Myth of Continents
- Cover
- Author: Martin W. Lewis and Karen E. Wigen
- Original title: The Myth of Continents: A Critique of Metageography
- Language: English
- Subject: Geography, history
- Genre: Non-fiction
- Publisher: University of California Press
- Publication date: 1997
- Publication place: United States, United Kingdom
- Pages: 344
- ISBN: 978-0520207431

The Myth of Continents: A Critique of Metageography is a book by American geographer Martin W. Lewis and historian Kären E. Wigen. It was published in 1997 by the University of California Press.

== Summary ==
Lewis and Wigen challenge conventional geographical divisions, arguing that concepts like East vs. West, First World vs. Third World, and the traditional seven-fold continental system oversimplify and misrepresent the world. The authors trace the historical development of these misconceptions and highlight the interconnectedness of Europe, Asia, and Africa as part of a single landmass. The Myth of Continents emphasizes how cultural concepts shaped our metageographical assumptions, exploring the evolution of continental divisions and recent shifts in macro-regions. The analysis also considers the impact of economic changes, the end of the Cold War, and communication technologies on global perspectives, urging a more thoughtful and geographically informed approach to understanding human diversity on a planetary scale. The authors propose a new approach based on historical processes rather than diagnostic traits, aiming to combat Eurocentrism and environmental determinism.

== Reviews ==
Xing Fang commended the book for challenging the conventional construct of continents, West and East, nation-states, and isolated civilizations. Fang appreciated the book's post-modern approach, emphasizing fluidity and multiplicity, and its organized composition. He highlighted its thorough historical review, its deconstruction of spatial and cultural notions, and its proposal of a revised world-region scheme. However, Fang noted some shortcomings, such as the need for in-depth discussion on comparable units, the limited exploration of oceanic cultural differences, and the book's concentration on Euro-American views. Despite these limitations, Fang saw the book as a valuable critique inspiring further studies in geography, history, anthropology, and political science.

In his review of the book in the New York Times, Michael Lind wrote:

Having criticized many others for their conceptual maps of the contemporary world, the authors are to be commended for their courage in setting forth their own ''refined world regional scheme.'' Their treatment of region as a surrogate for religion and culture works pretty well in Old World -- oops, I mean Afro-Eurasian regions like South Asia and East Asia. They are less convincing when they divide the Western Hemisphere into three regions, according to different and incompatible principles. North America and Ibero-America are defined by language and European colonial heritage, whereas ''African America,'' including the Caribbean islands and coastal Brazil (but not the American South) is defined by race. If language and culture are the criteria, shouldn't Britain be united with North America, Australia and New Zealand -- and Spain and Portugal with Ibero-America? In the map that Lewis and Wigen offer, Britain and Spain are assumed to have more in common with each other -- and with Scandinavia and Italy -- than either has with its former colonies. But these are quibbles. Debating these matters is not just important; it is fun. The very fact that their work stimulates such questions is a tribute to the authors. In ''The Myth of Continents,'' Lewis and Wigen have written an entertaining and informative account of the way our maps show us the world that we want to see.

Denis Cosgrove considered the book a serious and well-researched scholarly work that challenges conventional spatial divisions like continents and argues that they are arbitrary and discursive rather than scientific. Cosgrove also highlighted the authors' awareness of postcolonial sensibilities and the contradictions involved in embracing them while remaining committed to universal canons of scholarship.

In his review, Philip F. Kelly lauded the authors for critically examining common global categorizations such as continents, world regions, and East-West dichotomies. The review noted the book's thorough exploration of the historical and ideological aspects of these constructs, with a particular focus on the arbitrary nature of continental divisions. Kelly appreciated the authors' proposal of a modified world regional scheme that considers historical processes over specific diagnostic traits.

Tim Unwin acknowledged the book's sound historical interpretation and analysis of overarching terms used to describe the world order but criticized its exclusive focus on large-scale structures, such as continents and world-systems theory. Unwin noted the authors' rejection of postmodern perspectives and their attempt to develop a new metageography. While expressing disappointment with the book's proposed world regionalization scheme, he acknowledged its value in offering insights into the historicity of geographical terms.

Peter J. Taylor commended the book as a crucial exploration of critical metageography, emphasizing the significance of understanding how we structure our world spatially. Taylor emphasized the book's identification and critical examination of four geographical myths: continents, nation-states, east and west, and geographical concordance. He praised the authors for historicizing these myths and providing cartographic summaries that challenge conventional perspectives.

In his review, Robert Stock noted the authors' critical examination of metageographical constructs, including the classical Greek division and the seven-fold continental scheme. The review highlighted the book's exploration of Eurocentrism and Afrocentrism, with a positive acknowledgment of Afrocentric views challenging the Eurocentric perspective. Despite some critiques of the proposed alternative world regional framework, Stock commended the authors for producing a scholarly and thoroughly referenced volume that encourages a reevaluation of how we conceptualize large-scale territorial divisions on Earth.

David Hooson described the book as a timely exploration of how humanity has conceptualized distinct regions since classical times. Hooson highlighted the book's emphasis on questioning age-old assumptions and reexamining global schemes proposed by scholars like Arnold Toynbee, Immanuel Wallerstein, and Samuel Huntington. The authors' focus on historical processes and their critique of traditional geographical categorizations, such as Eurocentrism and the nation-state concept, were commended. Hooson acknowledged the book as a thought-provoking and scholarly tour de force, suggesting it should be essential reading for those interested in understanding the evolving nature of our diverse planet.

In his review, David C. Engerman, commended Lewis and Wigen for their critical examination of geographic categories, particularly continents. Engerman focused on the authors' challenge to traditional dichotomies between "East" and "West," questioning stereotypes associated with each. He noted the authors' extensive rebuttal of Karl Wittfogel's ideas and their broader critique of Eurocentrism, Afrocentrism, world-systems theories, and Samuel Huntington's "clash of civilizations" approach. Engerman appreciated the authors' proposed alternative of "world regions," emphasizing their historical self-consciousness and humility in addressing the complexities of geographic categories.

Barney Warf noted that readers would find it a "useful volume" which dealt with Eurocentrism, Afrocentrism, Orientalism, postcolonial thought, and geographic education. Because it summarized classic and contemporary research, the volume was "an important stepping-stone between frequently obtuse, jargon-laden academic works on the one hand, and popular views of geography on the other." Lewis and Wigen's concern is metageography, which they define as "the set of spatial structures through which people order their knowledge of the world" They find that geographies are "much more than just the ways in which societies are stretched across the earth's surface. They also include the contested, arbitrary, power-laden, and often inconsistent ways in which those structures are represented epistemologically."

The anthropologist Rita Kipp in reviewing the book wrote:

What is "mythical" about the canonical seven continents we learned in school is that their sometimes arbitrary boundaries can derail our generalizations about culture and history. The way "Africa" is used in much Afro-centric scholarship, for example, overlooks the cultural divide marked roughly by the Sahara Desert. Perhaps the most vexing continents, however, are Asia and Europe, the boundary between them being the tinder for many scholarly disputes. Martin and Wigen object, above all, when geographical determinism creeps into our talk of these "continents," as if the land forms themselves and their analytical separability explain why people live and think differently in these places.

Kipp confessed "I found myself in a defensive mood during much of this book, and sometimes bored with what I thought I already knew about Eurocentrism, Orientalism, and the social construction of all scholarly categories and boundaries. The total effect, however, is finally arresting."

Geographical historian James M. Blaut, while acknowledging the utility of the book, characterized it as "pretentious" and its argument as "rather conventional and indeed rather conservative." He particularly took issue with the authors' introduction of the term "metageography," dismissing it as an ostentatious substitute for "world cultural geography." This critique prompted a discussion in the Journal of World History, where Lewis and Wigen offered a response. In turn, Blaut conceded, stating, "Perhaps I placed too much emphasis on the shortcomings; if so, it was due to the somewhat off-putting tone of the book."
