= Matthew H. Sommer =

American social and legal historian

Academic background
- Education: Swarthmore College (BA, 1983); University of Washington (MA, 1987); University of California, Los Angeles (PhD, 1994)

Academic work
- Discipline: History
- Institutions: Stanford University

Matthew H. Sommer is an American social and legal historian, whose research focuses on gender, sexuality, and family during China's Qing dynasty. As of 2026, Sommer works at Stanford University and is the author of three books, two of which have been translated into Chinese.

== Early life and education ==
Sommer grew up in the San Francisco Bay Area. He had at least one sibling, a brother who died from cancer in 2012. In 1977, when Sommer was in high school, his brother informed Sommer he was gay. The following fall, Sommer travelled to China with his family. Sommer's early connections to China and queerness have greatly shaped his research interests.

Sommer received a Bachelor of Arts in political science from Swarthmore College in 1983, a Master of Arts in international studies with a focus on China from the University of Washington in 1987, and a Doctor of Philosophy in history from the University of California, Los Angeles in 1994.

== Career ==
As of 2026, Sommer works at Stanford University, where he serves as Bowman Family Professor of History and East Asian Languages and Cultures, as well as the Director of Graduate Admissions.

Sommer's first book, Sex, Law, and Society in Late Imperial China, was published by Stanford University Press in 2000, with a Chinese translation published by Guangxi Normal University Press in 2023. This work was followed by Polyandry and Wife-Selling in Qing Dynasty China: Survival Strategies and Judicial Interventions, which was published by the University of California Press in 2015. Sommer's most recent book, The Fox Spirit, the Stone Maiden, and Other Transgender Histories from Late Imperial China, was published by Columbia University Press in 2024, with a Chinese translation published by Oriental Publishing Center in 2026. In 2025, the book won the American Historical Association's John K. Fairbank Prize, the American Society for Legal History's Peter Gonville Stein Book Award, and the LGBTQ+ History Association's John Boswell Prize. It was also selected as Choice Outstanding Academic Title, and is a finalist for the 2026 Lambda Literary Award for LGBTQ+ Studies.

== Publications ==
- Sommer, Matthew H. (2000). Sex, Law, and Society in Late Imperial China. Stanford University Press. ISBN 978-0-804-74559-8.
  - Sommer, Matthew H. (2023). 中华帝国晚期的性、法律与社会 (in Chinese). Oriental Publishing Center. ISBN 978-7-559-85669-2.
- Sommer, Matthew (2015). Polyandry and Wife-Selling in Qing Dynasty China: Survival Strategies and Judicial Interventions. University of California Press. ISBN 978-0-231-21413-1.
- Sommer, Matthew (2024). The Fox Spirit, the Stone Maiden, and Other Transgender Histories from Late Imperial China. Columbia University Press. ISBN 978-0-231-21413-1.
  - Sommer, Matthew (2026). 清代社会性别规范 (in Chinese). Oriental Publishing Center. ISBN 978-7-547-32829-3.
