= California School of economic history =

Approach to the economic history of the early modern world

The California School of economic history is a label that has been applied to a particular approach to the economic history of the early modern world. The chief elements of their analysis is that over the period from 1400 to 1800 the most advanced economies of Eurasia formed a world of surprising resemblances. They argue that the Great Divergence, a divergence between the West (Western Europe) and the Rest (China, India and Japan) only really began with industrialisation in the 19th century. This Great Divergence should be interpreted as a more contingent and more recent phenomenon than the proponents of the Great Divergence have argued for, the basic cause of the divergence being framed in terms of the availability of the resources in the context of global interconnections and comparisons.

The most noted proponents of the approach include Kenneth Pomeranz, Roy Bin Wong, Jack Goldstone, James Z. Lee, Feng Wang, Dennis Flynn, Robert B. Marks, Andre Gunder Frank and Jack Goody and John M. Hobson. The name of the approach is due to most of these scholars working at Californian universities.

In comparing the Rest with the West, Vries critically, reviewing their approach, notes some differences in the emphasis of different scholars. Some argue that Europe was more backward, some that Asia was more advanced, some that Europe climbed on top of Asia via various forms of exploitation and some that the West and the Rest were really not that different. This later he refers to as the Eurasian similarity-thesis. Of importance in their analysis, according to Jack Goldstone (Grinin, L., & Korotayev, A. (2015, pp. v-vii)), is the continuing high productivity of both agricultural and manufacturing technology in India and China with them remaining world-dominant powers up to the end of the 17th Century. This, and the relatively high living standards, and competitive nature of their merchants, who were at least the equal of European trading companies in terms of power until the end of the 17th century. Pomeranz, who is perhaps the dominant figure in the approach, emphasises the access to natural resources (domestic coal and external colonies), rather than the alleged specialness of European capitalism, with its cultures of enlightenment and bourgeois virtues.

== Selected key readings ==
- Pomeranz, K., The Great Divergence. Europe, China, and the Making of the Modern World Economy (Princeton: Princeton University Press, 2000).
- Wong, R. B., China Transformed. Historical Change and the Limits of European Experience (Ithaca/London: Cornell University Press, 1997).
- Goldstone, J., ‘Efflorescences and Economic Growth in World History. Rethinking the ‘Rise of the West’ and the Industrial Revolution’, Journal of World History, 13 (2002): 323–89.
- Marks, R., The Origins of the Modern World: A Global and Ecological Narrative (Lanham: Rowman/Littlefield, 2002).
- Flynn, D., Giráldez, A., ‘Path Dependency, Time Lags and the Birth of Globalisation: A Critique of O’Rourke and Williamson’, European Review of Economic History, 8 (2004): 81–108.
- Frank, A. G., ReOrient. Global Economy in the Asian Age (Berkeley/Los Angeles/London: California University Press, 1998a).
- Goody, J., Capitalism and Modernity: The Great Debate (Cambridge: Cambridge University Press, 2004).
- Hobson, J., The Eastern Origins of Western Civilisation (Cambridge: Cambridge University Press, 2004).
