= Christopher Goscha =

American-Canadian historian (born 1965)

Christopher E. Goscha
- Born: Wichita, Kansas, United States
- Title: Full professor at Université du Québec à Montréal (UQÀM)

Academic work
- Notable works: Historical Dictionary of the Indochina War (1945–1954): An International and Interdisciplinary Approach (2011); Vietnam: Un Etat né de la guerre (2011); Going Indochinese: Contesting Concepts of Space and Place in French Indochina (2012); Vietnam: A New History (2016)

Christopher E. Goscha (born 1965) is an American-Canadian historian specializing in the history of the Cold War in Asia, decolonization, and the wars for Vietnam. He teaches the history of international relations, the Vietnam Wars, and world history at the Université du Québec à Montréal (UQAM). He is a member of the Royal Society of Canada since 2019.

== Biography ==
Goscha was born in 1965 in Kansas, the United States.

In 1987, he received his undergraduate degree at the School of Foreign Service at Georgetown University in Washington D.C., United States. In 1992, he obtained his Master's degree in Southeast Asian history at the Australian National University in Canberra. He obtained a second Master's degree in 1994 at the Université de Paris VII in France.

He spent several years in Thailand and Vietnam where he studied Thai and Vietnamese.

In 2000, he defended his PhD at the École Pratique des Hautes Études (IV Section, Historical and Philological Sciences). His thesis, entitled "The Asian Context of the Franco-Vietnamese War: Networks, Relations and Economy (1945-1954)", examined the Indochina War from a transnational perspective. Since 2005, he has lived and worked in Canada where he is a citizen.

== Teaching and research ==
He joined the History Department at UQÀM in 2005 where he teaches the history of international relations, the Vietnam War, and world history.

His main research topics and courses focus on the history of the wars in Vietnam, international relations, the Cold War, world history, and comparative decolonization.

Since 1995, he has published and edited a dozen books. In 2012, his Historical Dictionary of the Indochina War (1945–1954): An International and Interdisciplinary Approach was included in the prestigious list of Outstanding Academic Titles 2012 compiled by the American magazine Choice. It is the first thematic multidisciplinary dictionary on the Indochina War. Goscha is supervisor of the On-Line Resource Site on the Indochina War at the UQÀM. He is also co-editor of the eight-volume series From Indochina to Vietnam: Revolution and War in a Global Perspective, published by University of California Press.

In his book Going Indochinese: Contesting Concepts of Space and Place in French Indochina (University of Hawa’ii Press, 2012), he questions the concept of French Indochina by analyzing the interactions among Vietnamese, Cambodians and Laotians and shows how a range of Vietnamese nationalists imagined the future of their nation in Indochinese terms.

He published in 2016, The Penguin History of Vietnam (Penguin/Random House, 2016), Vietnam: A New History (Basic Books, 2016, American version of the preceding book). This history of Vietnam was the winner of the 2017 John K. Fairbank Prize – American Historical Association, and finalist for the Cundill History Prize.

== Selected works ==
- Vietnam or Indochina: Contesting Concepts of Space in Vietnamese Nationalism, 1887-1954, Copenhagen: Nordic Institute of Asian Studies, 1995.
- Thailand and the Southeast Asian Networks of the Vietnamese Revolution (1885–1954), Richmond: Curzon Press, 1999.
- La guerre du Vietnam et l'Europe (1963–1973) [The Vietnam War and Europe (1963–1973)], Bruxelles, Paris: Bruylant, L.G.D.J., 2003, with Maurice Vaïsse (eds.).
- Contesting Visions of the Lao Past: Lao Historiography at the Crossroads, Copenhagen, London: Nordic Institute of Asian Studies / Taylor & Francis, 2003, with Søren Ivarsson (eds.).
- Naissance d'un Etat-Parti: Le Viêt Nam depuis 1945 [The Birth of a Party-State: Vietnam since 1945], Paris: Les Indes Savantes, 2004, with Benoît de Tréglodé (eds.).
- L'espace d'un regard: l'Asie de Paul Mus (1902–1969), Paris: Les Indes Savantes, 2006, with David Chandler.
- Connecting Histories. Decolonization and the Cold War in Southeast Asia, 1945–1962, Washington D.C., Stanford: Woodrow Wilson Center / Stanford University Press, 2009, with Christian F. Ostermann (eds.).
- L'échec de la paix en Indochine, 1954–1962 [The failure of peace in Indochina, 1954–1962], Paris : Les Indes Savantes, 2010, with Karine Laplante (eds.).
- Historical Dictionary of the Indochina War: An International and Interdisciplinary Approach (1945–1954), Honolulu / Copenhagen: University of Hawai'i Press / Nordic Institute of Asian Studies, 2011 and 2012.
- Vietnam, un Etat né de la guerre, 1945–1954 [Vietnam, a state born of war, 1945–1954], Paris : Armand Colin, 2011, translated from English by Agathe Larcher-Goscha.
- Going Indochinese: Contesting Concepts of Space and Place in French Indochina, 1885–1945, Honolulu / Copenhagen: University of Hawai'i Press / Nordic Institute of Asian Studies, 2012.
- Vietnam: A New History, New York: Basic Books, 2016.
- The Penguin History of Modern Vietnam, London: Penguin Books, 2016.
- The Road to Dien Bien Phu: A History of the First War for Vietnam, Princeton University Press, 2022.
