= Wagering the Land =

1991 Book by Martin W. Lewis

- Cover
- Author: Martin W. Lewis
- Original title: Wagering the Land: Ritual, Capital, and Environmental Degradation in the Cordillera of Northern Luzon, 1900–1986
- Language: English
- Genre: Non-fiction
- Publisher: University of California Press
- Publication date: 1991
- Publication place: United States
- Pages: 280
- ISBN: 0-520-07272-3

Wagering the Land: Ritual, Capital, and Environmental Degradation in the Cordillera of Northern Luzon, 1900–1986 is a book by Martin W. Lewis. It was published in 1991 by the University of California Press.

== Summary ==
The book explores a distinctive system of prestige feasting tied to an ancestor cult in Buguias, Benguet province, Philippines, emphasizing its prevalence among the Southern Kankana-ey ethnic group engaged in commerce. Lewis reconstructs Buguias during the American period, detailing its socio-economic reliance on sweet potato cultivation, cattle herding, and an extensive trading network. The disruption caused by the Japanese occupation in 1944-45 led to the collapse of the traditional system, replaced by a new model centered around Chinese-led temperate vegetable cultivation. The book explores the development of truck gardening in Luzon's highlands after World War II, linking it to ritual feasting and environmental degradation. The period from 1972 to 1990 witnesses a crisis in the commercialized system due to factors such as land erosion, population growth, and market competition. Despite the challenges, the ritual system persists, making Buguias a notable center of southern Cordilleran Paganism.

== Critical reception ==
In his review, James A. Hafner acknowledged the book's contribution to the reevaluation of geographic thinking about development, in the context of political economy and radical development studies. The review noted the shift from earlier political economy research on uneven development to then recent emphasis on cultural aspects, interpretation, and improved links between theory and empirical work. Hafner highlighted the book's focus on Southeast Asia, specifically the Cordillera of northern Luzon in the Philippines, where Lewis challenged modernization theory by demonstrating that economic integration through small-scale commodity production does not necessarily lead to the breakdown of communitarian social order. The review praised the book's meticulous exploration of the Buguias region, detailing its socio-cultural, economic, and ecological landscape from the early 20th century to the aftermath of World War II. Hafner noted Lewis's comprehensive analysis of the transition to commercialization after World War II and the resulting ecological challenges.

Thomas Gibson outlined Lewis' examination of social, economic, and ritual developments in highland Luzon. Gibson suggested that while the author's geographically and temporally broad approach is comprehensive, more in-depth analysis of ritual practices is needed to substantiate the book's claims. He wrote:

The author's training as a geographer is reflected in the broad temporal and spatial focus of the study, which includes three well-demarcated periods and the complex interactions of several specialized ethnic groups in highland Luzon.

Melanie Wiber acknowledged the book's merits, noting its accessibility for undergraduate students, effective historical summaries, and valuable perspectives on population dynamics, trade patterns, and ecological degradation. However, she pointed out some shortcomings, citing gaps in Lewis's argument, such as insufficient data support for the proposed link between commercial farming and redistributive feasting in Buguias. Wiber raised concerns about the unclear details of Lewis's collaboration with Buguias residents in his research methodology. She also questioned the lack of substantiation for claims related to social differentiation, labor control, and female status improvement with commercialization. Despite these criticisms, Wiber acknowledged the book's contribution to understanding the challenges faced by capitalized farming globally.

James F. Eder admitted the study's significant contributions to understanding the interplay of agricultural change and cultural persistence in the Cordillera region of Northern Luzon. Eder praised the descriptive contributions, including insights into the indigenous economy, vegetational change, land tenure, regional trading, and the history of the vegetable industry. Eder criticized the book for underutilizing etic terms and lacking systematic quantitative data, particularly in analyzing agricultural change and social dynamics. Despite the methodological shortcomings, Eder recognized the book as a major contribution to the literature, advancing understanding of the Cordilleran people's past, present, and potential future.

Lars Kjaerholm of Aarhus University appreciated the book's historical perspective, particularly its exploration of how colonial administration and the introduction of a market economy transformed the landscape and culture over time. He highlighted the author's demonstration of the clash between traditional peasant societies and centralized state administration, attributing it to present political issues in the Cordillera mountains. Kjaerholm recognized the book's focus on the American administration era as pivotal in driving significant changes, contrasting it with the limited impact of Spanish administration. While commending the study's strengths in geography, economy, and ecology, Kjaerholm critiqued Lewis's characterization of Buguias society as "highly stratified," suggesting it may not align with broader social science perspectives on peasant societies. Despite his criticism, Kjaerholm concluded that the book is an inspiring and groundbreaking exploration of social, cultural, and ecological changes in the Cordillera region.

Jon Gross wrote a mixed review of the book. He considered the book a success as an ethnographic history, praising its use of empirical observations and oral history to document the transformation of the agro-ecological base, social relations, and cultural institutions in Buguias Central. However, Gross expressed skepticism about the book's argument against the conventional wisdom that commercialization leads to the breakdown of communitarian societies. He noted that Lewis's denial of the efficacy of a materialist approach and the limited theoretical section created gaps in the analysis. Gross appreciated the detailed and convincing account of the transformation in agricultural practices but criticized the lack of diverse voices in the text. Despite these concerns, Gross concluded that "Wagering the Land" is an excellent piece of research that contributes to understanding the political economy in the uplands of the Philippines.
