= Martin W. Lewis =

American historical geographer

Professor Emeritus Martin W. Lewis
- Born: 1956 (age 69–70); Coos Bay, Oregon
- Occupations: Historical geographer, author, academic
- Years active: 1987–present
- Title: Professor Emeritus
- Spouse: Kären Wigen

Academic background
- Education: BA, MA, Ph.D. (1987)
- Alma mater: University of California, Berkeley
- Thesis: Wagering the Land: Ritual, Capital, and Environmental Degradation in the Cordillera of Northern Luzon, 1900–1986 (1987 (Note: His thesis was the basis of a book of the title that was published later in 1992))

Academic work
- Discipline: Geography
- Sub-discipline: Historical geography, Metageography
- Institutions: Stanford University
- Main interests: Historical geography, Metageography
- Notable works: The Myth of Continents: A Critique of Metageography (1997); Green Delusions: An Environmentalist Critique of Radical Environmentalism (1992)
- Website: web.stanford.edu/~mwlewis/

Martin W. Lewis (born 1956 in Coos Bay, Oregon) is an American historical geographer, author, and academic. He is a senior lecturer emeritus in History at Stanford University.

== Early life and education ==
Lewis was born in 1956 in Coos Bay, Oregon. He graduated from Calaveras High School in San Andreas, California in 1975 and earned a Bachelor of Arts in Environmental Studies from the University of California, Santa Cruz in 1979, followed by a Master of Arts and a Doctor of Philosophy in Geography from the University of California, Berkeley in 1985 and 1987, respectively.

== Career ==
Lewis' early academic focus was on the interplay between economic development, environmental degradation, and cultural change in the highlands of northern Luzon in the Philippines, explored in his dissertation and first book. He also wrote on environmental philosophy. His 1992 book Green Delusions: An Environmentalist Critique of Radical Environmentalism is often seen as a forerunner of the ecomodernist movement. As of 2024, Lewis is a senior scholar at the Breakthrough Institute.

Later, in collaboration with Kären Wigen, Lewis critically examined metageography in The Myth of Continents: A Critique of Metageography (University of California Press, 1997). Lewis co-authored a world geography textbook, Diversity Amid Globalization: World Regions, Environment, Development (Pearson), and served as the former associate editor of The Geographical Review. After teaching at George Washington University and Duke University, Lewis joined Stanford in 2002, studying and writing mostly about global geography. His interest in historical geography led to work on historical linguistics, culminating in the publication of The Indo-European Controversy (with linguist Asya Pereltsvaig) in 2015. Lewis publishes a blog called GeoCurrents that examines a wide variety of geographical and historical topics and includes many original maps.

== Views on metageography and postmodernism ==
In a 2010 interview he gave to Leonhardt van Efferink from Exploring Geopolitics, Lewis defined metageography as the often overlooked spatial frameworks through which knowledge is organized in social sciences and humanities. He criticized metageographies for oversimplifying the world and transforming specific places into cultural essences. Lewis argued that metageographical constructs are inherently ideological and influenced by different ideological systems. While acknowledging metageographies as intellectual constructs, he rejected the notion that they are merely social constructs. Regarding postmodernism, Lewis appreciated its questioning of received categories but criticized its tendency to erase its own position and indulge in too much theory. He noted the fallacy of unit comparability, challenging the practice of portraying all countries as comparable units, and advocated for a cosmopolitan perspective that pays attention to all parts of the world and organizes information based on size and population.

== Bibliography ==
=== Books ===
- Indo-European Languages: Facts and Fallacies in their Origin And History (with Asya Pereltsvaig).
- Diversity Amid Globalization: World Regions, Environment, Development (6th Edition) (Note: A textbook)
- The Myth of Continents: A Critique of Metageography (1997)
- Green Delusions: An Environmentalist Critique of Radical Environmentalism (1994)
- Wagering the Land: Ritual, Capital, and Environmental Degradation in the Cordillera of Northern Luzon, 1900–1986 (1992)

=== Book chapters and editing ===
- The Promise of—and the Threats to—Historical Linguistics as a Complement of Bentleyan World History (2017)
- Where is Asia? What is the Pacific?: The Politics and Practice of Global Division (2010)
- • The Flight from Science and Reason (Annals of the New York Academy of Sciences). 1997. (Co-edited with Norman Levitt and Paul R. Gross.)

=== Articles ===
- Lewis, M. W. (1999). Is There a Third World?. Current History, 98(631), 355–358.
- Lewis, M. W. (1999). Dividing the ocean sea. Geographical review, 89(2), 188–214.
- Lewis, M. W., & Wigen, K. (1999). A maritime response to the crisis in area studies. Geographical Review, 89(2), 161–168.
- Price, M., & Lewis, M. (1993). The reinvention of cultural geography. Annals of the Association of American Geographers, 83(1), 1–17.
- Lewis, M. W. (1991). Elusive Societies: A Regional Cartographical Approach to the Study of Human Relatedness. Annals of the Association of American Geographers, 81(4), 605–626.
- Lewis, M. W. (1989). Commercialization and community life: The geography of market exchange in a small‐scale Philippine society. Annals of the Association of American Geographers, 79(3), 390–410.

== Personal life ==
Lewis is married to Karen Wigen. They have two children Evan and Eleanor.
