= Shōtarō Yasuoka =

Japanese writer

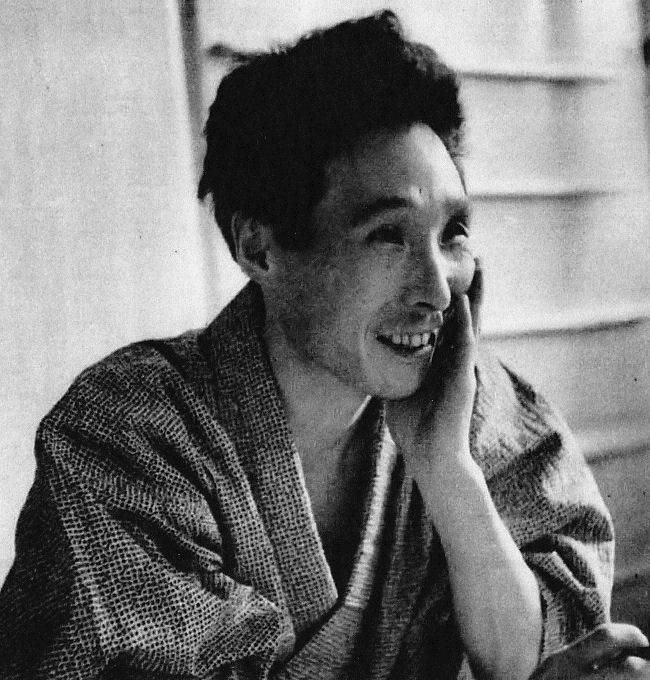
- Born: May 30, 1920; Kōchi, Kōchi, Japan
- Died: January 26, 2013 (aged 92); Tokyo, Japan
- Occupations: Author, novelist
- Writing career
- Genre: Fiction

Shōtarō Yasuoka (安岡 章太郎, Yasuoka Shōtarō; May 30, 1920 – January 26, 2013) was a Japanese writer.

== Biography ==
Yasuoka was born in pre-war Japan in Kōchi, Kōchi, but as the son of a veterinary corpsman in the Imperial Army, he spent most of his youth moving from one military post to another. In 1944, he was conscripted and served briefly overseas. After the war, he became ill with spinal caries, and it was "while he was bedridden with this disease that he began his writing career." Yasuoka died in his home at age 92 in Tokyo, Japan.

== Awards ==
As an influential Japanese writer, Yasuoka's work has won him various prizes and awards. Notably, he received the Akutagawa Prize for Inki na tanoshimi (A Melancholy Pleasure, 1953) and Warui nakama (Bad Company, 1953); Kaihen no kōkei (A View by the Sea, 1959) won him the Noma Literary Prize; and his Maku ga orite kara (After the Curtain Fell, 1967) won the Mainichi Cultural Prize. He also received the Yomiuri Literary Prize for Hate mo nai dōchūki (The Never-ending Traveler's Journal, 1996); and the Osaragi Jirō Prize for Kagamigawa (The Kagami River, 2000).

A leading figure in post-war Japanese literature, in 2001 Yasuoka was recognized by the Japanese government as a Person of Cultural Merit.

== Translations ==
Japanese title	English title	Year	English translation, year
愛玩 "Aigan"	"Prized Possessions" (short story)	1952	Edwin McClellan, 1977
海辺の光景 "Kaihen no kōkei"	A View by the Sea	1959	Kären Wigen, 1984
