= Eiichiro Azuma =

American historian

- Born: September 27, 1966 (age 60); Tokyo, Japan
- Education: University of California at Los Angeles
- Occupations: Historian, professor, scholar, writer
- Known for: History of Japanese Americans

Eiichiro Azuma (Japanese: 東 栄一郎, born 27 September 1966) is a Japanese-born American historian, writer, and professor. He has served as a Professor of History and Asian American Studies at the University of Pennsylvania. The focus of his work is Japanese Americans in relationship to migration, Japanese colonialism, and U.S. and Japan relations.

== Biography ==
Eiichiro Azuma was born 27 September 1966 in Tokyo, Japan. He graduated from University of California at Los Angeles with an M.A. degree in Asian American Studies (1992), and a Ph.D. in history (2000).

He has taught at the University of Pennsylvania since January 2001. Starting in fall 2009, he held the position of Alan Charles Kors Endowed Term Chair in history. Azuma served as the director of the Asian American Studies Program at the University of Pennsylvania from 2013 through 2018.

His work appeared in the Journal of American History, Journal of Asian Studies, Pacific Historical Review and Journal of American-East Asian Relations, Reviews in American History. He is co-editor of the Asian American Studies book series at the University of Illinois Press."

== Awards ==
- 2006 Frederick Jackson Turner Award Honorable Mention by the Organization of American Historians, for Between Two Empires
- 2008–2009, he was also a recipient of the Donald D. Harrington Faculty Fellowship from the University of Texas, Austin
- 2020 John K. Fairbanks Prize in East Asian history, from the American Historical Association, for his work In Search of Our Frontier
- Theodore Saloutos Award from the Immigration and Ethnic History Society, for Between Two Empires
- History Book Award from the Association for Asian American Studies, for Between Two Empires
- Hiroshi Shimizu book prize from the Japanese Association of American Studies, for Between Two Empires
- History Book Award Honorable Mention from the Association for Asian American Studies, for Before Internment

== Publications ==
=== Books ===
- Azuma, Eiichiro (1992). Walnut Grove: Japanese Farm Community in the Sacramento River Delta, 1892–1942 (dissertation). University of California, Los Angeles. OCLC 27448287.
- Akemi Kikumura-Yano, ed. (2002). Encyclopedia of Japanese descendants in the Americas: an illustrated history of the Nikkei. Compiled by Brian Niiya, Michieo Kodama-Nishimoto, Eiichiro Azuma. Rowman Altamira. ISBN 978-0-7591-0149-4.
- Azuma, Eiichiro (2005). Between Two Empires: Race, History, and Transnationalism in Japanese America. Oxford University Press. ISBN 9780195159400.
- Yuji Ichioka (2006). Gordon H. Chang; Eiichiro Azuma (eds.). Before Internment: Essays in Prewar Japanese American History (Stanford University Press, 2006. Stanford University Press. ISBN 978-0-8047-5147-6. "Eiichiro Azuma."
- Takezawa, Yasuko; Okihiro, Gary Y., eds. (2016). Trans-Pacific Japanese American Studies: Conversations on Race and Racializations. Eiichiro Azuma (contributor), Michael Omi (contributor), Yuko Konno (contributor), Fuminori Minamikawa (contributor), Andrea Geiger (contributor), Yuko Matsumoto (contributor), Valerie J. Matsumoto (contributor), Wesley Ueunten (contributor), Sachiko Kawakami (contributor), Rika Nakamura (contributor), Masumi Izumi (contributor), Mari J. Matsuda (Contributor), Noriko K. Ishii (contributor), Lon Kurashige (contributor), Okiyoshi Takeda (contributor), Yoko Tsukuda (contributor), Duncan Ryuken Williams (contributor). University of Hawaii Press. ISBN 978-0824847586.
- Azuma, Eiichiro (2019). In Search of Our Frontier Japanese America and Settler Colonialism in the Construction of Japan's Borderless Empire. Volume 17 of Asia Pacific Modern. University of California Press. ISBN 9780520304383.
