= Modern China (journal) =

- Language: English
- Edited by: Philip C. C. Huang

Publication details
- History: 1987-present
- Publisher: SAGE Publications
- Frequency: Quarterly
- Impact factor: 0.8 (2017)

Standard abbreviations
- ISO 4: Mod. China

Indexing
- ISSN: 0097-7004 (print); 1552-6836 (web)
- LCCN: 75642238
- OCLC no.: 16804780

Links
- Journal homepage; Online access; Online archive

Modern China is a peer-reviewed academic journal dedicated to China studies. Its current editor is Philip C. C. Huang (University of California). It has been in publication since 1975 and is currently published by SAGE Publications.

== Scope ==
Modern China is a source of scholarship in history and the social sciences on late-imperial, twentieth century and present-day China. The journal publishes periodic symposia on topics in Chinese studies, review articles on particular areas of scholarship and book reviews.

== Abstracting and indexing ==
Modern China is abstracted and indexed in, among other databases: SCOPUS, and the Social Sciences Citation Index. According to the Journal Citation Reports, its 2017 impact factor is 0.8, ranking it 28 out of 68 journals in the category ‘Area Studies’.
