= Chicken-blood therapy =

Pseudo-medical therapy

Chicken-blood therapy was a form of pseudo-medical therapy popular in China during the Cultural Revolution. It was practised mainly by village doctors in the 1960s. It has been banned for official use by the government since July 1965. The expression to inject chicken blood (Chinese: 打鸡血; pinyin: dǎ jīxuè) remains in the modern Chinese lexicon as a metaphor for getting one pumped up.

== Therapy ==
The therapy consisted of weekly injections of dozens to a hundred millilitres fresh blood extracted from chicken, preferably young cocks, either intravenously or directly into the muscle of the patient. The therapy was said to have been able to cure high blood pressure, paralysis, athlete's foot, hemorrhoids, persistent cough, and the common cold. The injections were believed to be effective not only as a treatment, but also as a preventative measure.

It was said that the therapy enabled the entry of certain proteins into the body to elicit an immune response, but this claim was quickly determined to be a gross exaggeration. Other problems with the therapy immediately became apparent, such as infection and even death from poor chicken blood quality and a lack of purity control.

== Government attitude ==
After learning of chicken-blood therapy, the Government of China initially banned the therapy; Premier Zhou Enlai reportedly said that “The Central Ministry of Health’s handling of chicken blood therapy is a violation of Mao Zedong Thought.” However, in 1967, the ban was lifted as part of the Cultural Revolution. Red Guards from Beijing and Shanghai jointly began encouraging the use of chicken-blood therapy as a legitimate cure.
