= Roy Bin Wong =

Chinese economic historian

Roy Bin Wong (Chinese: 王國斌; pinyin: Wáng Guóbīn; born 1949) is a Chinese economics historian at the UCLA.

He was the Director of the UCLA Asia Institute from 2004 to 2016.

He completed a BA at the University of Michigan, and an MA and PhD at Harvard University.

== Works ==
- Wong, Roy Bin (1997). China Transformed: Historical Change and the Limits of European Experience. Cornell University Press.
