= Masao Miyoshi =

Japanese-American literary and cultural scholar

- Born: 1928; Tokyo, Japan
- Died: 1 October 2009
- Education: University of Tokyo; New York University
- Scientific career
- Fields: Comparative Literature; Sociology; Cultural Studies
- Workplaces: University of California, San Diego

Masao Miyoshi (三好将夫, Miyoshi Masao; 1928 – 1 October 2009) was a scholar of literature and culture and Hajime Mori Endowed Chair in Japanese Language and Literature at the University of California, San Diego.

== Career ==
Born in Tokyo, he graduated from the University of Tokyo, majoring in English, and earned a Fulbright Fellowship to gain advanced degrees at New York University. Specializing in Victorian literature, he first taught at the University of California Berkeley, where he started working on Japanese literature as well. Eventually moving to the University of California, San Diego, he increasingly focused his writings on the relations between Japan and the United States and the problems of globalization.

Miyoshi's books include The Divided Self: A Perspective on the Literature of the Victorians (1969), Accomplices of Silence: The Modern Japanese Novel (1975), As We Saw Them: The First Japanese Embassy to the United States (1860) (1979), Off Center: Power and Culture Relations Between Japan and the United States (1991), and The University in 'Globalization': Culture, Economy, and Ecology (2003). He also edited and co-edited anthologies on globalization, post-modernism, and the future of area studies.

== See also ==
- Fredric Jameson

== Bibliography ==
- The Divided Self: A Perspective on the Literature of the Victorians. New York: New York UP and London UP, 1969.
- Accomplices of Silence: The Modern Japanese Novel. Berkeley: University of California Press, 1975.
- As We Saw Them: The First Japanese Embassy to the United States (1860). Berkeley: University of California Press, 1979. Second edition, New York: Kodansha International, 1994.
- Postmodernism and Japan (co-edited with H. D. Harootunian). Durham/London: Duke UP, 1989.
- Off Center: Power and Culture Relations Between Japan and the United States. Cambridge: Harvard UP, 1991.
- A special Japan issue, Manoa: A Pacific Journal of International Writing (editor). Honolulu: University of Hawaii Press, 1991.
- Japan in the World (co-edited with H. D. Harootunian). Durham/London: Duke UP, 1993.
- The Culture of Globalization (co-edited with Fredric Jameson). Durham/London: Duke UP, 1997.
- Learning Places: The Afterlives of Area Studies (co-ed. with H.D. Harootunian). Duke UP, 2002.
- Teiko no ba e [Sites of Resistance]: Interviews with Masao Miyoshi. (transcribed and translated into Japanese by Mitsuhiro Yoshimoto). Kyoto: Rakuhoku Shuppan, 2007.
- this is not here: Selected Photographs by Masao Miyoshi. Los Angeles: highmoonoon, 2009.
- Trespasses [Selected Writings by Miyoshi]. (ed. Eric Cazdyn with preface by Fredric Jameson). Durham: Duke University Press, 209, forthcoming.
- "A Borderless World? From Colonialism to Transnationalism and the Decline of the Nation-State," Critical Inquiry, 19.4 (Summer 1993): 726–751.
- "Sites of Resistance in the Global Economy," boundary 2, 22.1 (Spring 1995): 61–84.
- "Radical Art at documenta X," New Left Review, 228 (March/April 1998): 151–161.
- "'Globalization,' Culture and the University," Cultures of Globalization (co-edited with Fredric Jameson). Durham/London: Duke UP, 1998: 247–270.
- "Japan Is Not Interesting," Re-Mapping Japanese Culture: Papers of the 10th Biennial Conference of the Japanese Studies Association of Australia. Monash Asia Institute, 2000: 11–25.
- "Ivory Tower in Escrow," boundary 2 (Spring 2000): 8–50.
- "Turn to the Planet: Literature, Diversity, and Totality," Comparative Literature (Fall 2001).
