= Philip C. C. Huang =

American historian of China

Philip Chung-Chih Huang is a historian of China who was for many years (1966–2004) a professor at the UCLA. While there, he founded their Center for Chinese Studies and he was the founding Editor of Modern China: An International Journal of History and Social Science.

== Selected publications ==
- Huang, P. (1985). The peasant economy and social change in North China. Stanford University Press.
- Huang, P. C. (1993). " Public Sphere"/" Civil Society" in China? The Third Realm between State and Society. Modern China, 19(2), 216–240.
- Huang, P. C. (1996). Civil justice in China: representation and practice in the Qing. Stanford University Press. Perdue, Peter C. "Civil Justice in China: Representation and Practice in the Qing." The Journal of Interdisciplinary History, vol. 28, no. 3, winter 1998, pp. 499+. Gale Academic OneFile, link.gale.com/apps/doc/A20436567/AONE?u=anon~5e551582&sid=bookmark-AONE&xid=925ac33b. Accessed 5 June 2024.
- Huang, P. C. (2002). Development or involution in eighteenth-century Britain and China? A Review of Kenneth Pomeranz's The Great Divergence: China, Europe, and the Making of the Modern World Economy. The Journal of Asian Studies, 61(2), 501–538.
