= Bruce Cumings =

American historian (born 1943)

- Cumings c. 1990
- Born: September 5, 1943 (age 83); Rochester, New York, U.S.
- Awards: John K. Fairbank Prize (1983) Quincy Wright Book Award University of Chicago Excellence in Graduate Teaching (2003) Kim Dae-jung Academic Award (2007)

Academic background
- Education: Denison University (BS); Indiana University (MA); Columbia University (PhD)

Academic work
- Discipline: East Asian history International relations
- Institutions: University of Chicago; Northwestern University; University of Washington; Swarthmore College
- Notable works: Korea's Place in the Sun: A Modern History (1997)

Bruce Cumings (born September 5, 1943) is an American historian of East Asia, professor, lecturer and author. He is the Gustavus F. and Ann M. Swift Distinguished Service Professor in History, and the former chair of the history department at the University of Chicago. He formerly taught at Northwestern University and the University of Washington. He specializes in modern Korean history and contemporary international relations.

In May 2007, Cumings was the first recipient of the Kim Dae-jung Academic Award for Outstanding Achievements and Scholarly Contributions to Democracy, Human Rights and Peace granted by South Korea. The award is named in honor of 2000 Nobel Peace Prize winner and former president of South Korea Kim Dae-jung. The award recognizes Cumings for his "outstanding scholarship, and engaged public activity regarding human rights and democratization during the decades of dictatorship in Korea, and after the dictatorship ended in 1987."

Cumings' Origins of the Korean War, Vol. 1 (1980) won the John K. Fairbank Prize of the American Historical Association, and his Origins of the Korean War, Vol. 2 (1991) won the Quincy Wright Book Award of the International Studies Association.

== Biography ==
Cumings was born in Rochester, New York, on September 5, 1943. He was raised in Iowa and Ohio, where his father, Edgar C. Cumings, was a college administrator. He worked summers for five years, three of them at the Republic Steel plant in Cleveland, to put himself through Denison University, with further help from a baseball scholarship. He graduated with a degree in psychology in 1965, then served in the Peace Corps in Korea in 1967–68 before taking a M.A. at Indiana University. He then earned a Ph.D. in political science from Columbia University in 1975. He taught at Swarthmore College, University of Washington, Northwestern University, and University of Chicago. In 1999 he was elected a fellow of the American Academy of Arts and Sciences.

He was married to Meredith Jung-En Woo, the former president of Sweet Briar College and former Dean of Arts & Sciences at University of Virginia. They had two sons; additionally, Cumings has a daughter from his first marriage.

== Intellectual life and scholarship ==
Cumings joined the Committee of Concerned Asian Scholars at Columbia after Mark Selden formed a chapter there, and published extensively in its journal, Bulletin of Concerned Asian Scholars, where his writings ranged from the early history of the Korean resistance movement against Japan to the intertwining of US academia with US intelligence agencies. His research focus is on 20th century international history, United States and East Asia relations, East Asian political economy, modern Korean history, and American foreign relations. He is interested in the "multiplicity of ways that conceptions, metaphors and discourses are related to political economy and material forms of production", and to relations between "East and West".

Cumings wrote:

The Korean War did not begin on June 25, 1950, much special pleading and argument to the contrary. If it did not begin then, Kim II Sung could not have "started" it then, either, but only at some earlier point. As we search backward for that point, we slowly grope toward the truth that civil wars do not start: they come. They originate in multiple causes, with blame enough to go around for everyone—and blame enough to include Americans who thoughtlessly divided Korea and then reestablished the colonial government machinery and the Koreans who served it. How many Koreans might still be alive had not that happened? Blame enough to include a Soviet Union likewise unconcerned with Korea's ancient integrity and determined to "build socialism" whether Koreans wanted their kind of system or not. How many Koreans might still be alive had that not happened? And then, as we peer inside Korea to inquire about Korean actions that might have avoided national division and fratricidal conflict, we get a long list indeed.

Cumings has not confined himself purely to the study of modern Korea but has written broadly about East Asia and even books about the expansion of the American West. He wrote Industrial Behemoth: The Northeast Asian Political Economy in the 20th Century, which seeks to understand the industrialization of Japan, both Koreas, Taiwan, and parts of China, and the ways that scholars and political leaders have viewed that development.

Cumings wrote in his book North Korea: Another Country: "I have no sympathy for the North, which is the author of most of its own troubles," but he alludes to the "significant responsibility that all Americans share for the garrison state that emerged on the ashes of our truly terrible destruction of the North half a century ago."

In a talk given at the University of Chicago in 2003, Cumings declared that the US had "occupied" South Korea for 58 years. He explained that, in 1945, the Chinese and Soviets had armies in the north of Korea and that the Americans had an army in the south. The Soviets withdrew in 1948, followed by the Chinese in 1958, but US troops remained in South Korea, and in the event of war, the US commander would control the South Korean Army. He disputed the contention that North Korea had cheated on the October 1994 Agreed Framework.

After the 2024 South Korean martial law crisis, which ended with the impeachment of President Yoon Suk Yeol, Cumings wrote in The Nation that South Korean democracy "is the most successful example of evolution from decades of military dictatorship to genuine democracy", specifically noting that the majority of the Korean military refused to participate in Yoon's martial law decree. In a 2025 interview, Cumings stated that he believes Korean democracy was strengthened by the martial law crisis, as Yoon was removed through democratic means instead of physical violence.

== Reception ==
In 2003, the University of Chicago awarded Cumings for "Excellence in Graduate Teaching." Four years later, he was awarded the Kim Dae Jung Prize for "Scholarly Contributions to Democracy, Human Rights, and Peace." Cumings has been described as "the left's leading scholar of Korean history." Paul H. Nitze School of Advanced International Studies scholar Kathryn Weathersby wrote that Cumings’ two-volume study of the origins of the Korean War was the "most important revisionist account" in which Cumings provides an interpretation of the war in which "the question remains open whether it was in fact the DPRK or the ROK that initiated the military action on 25 June 1950."

The University of Georgia historian William W. Stueck does not find that account to be convincing but acknowledges that Cumings succeeds in exploring aspects of the Korean War that have lacked analysis in traditionalist accounts. Stueck notes that Cumings published more than a generation after the start of the war and that his arguments "challenged the views that the war was largely international in nature and that the American participation in it was – with at least one prominent exception – defensive and wise.” The historian Allan R. Millett argued that the work's "eagerness to cast American officials and policy in the worst possible light, however, often leads him to confuse chronological cause and effect and to leap to judgments that cannot be supported by the documentation he cites or ignores." Matt Gordon in Socialist Review praised Cumings' North Korea: Another Country (2003) as a "good read... for an introduction to this member of 'the axis of evil', especially given the lack of books on the subject which aren't hysterical denunciations from the U.S. right or hymns of praise from Stalinists." Reviewing The Korean War (2010), William Stueck wrote, "Cumings displays a limited grasp of sources that have emerged since he published his second volume on the war's origins in 1990" and that readers "wanting an up-to-date account of the war in all its complexity should look elsewhere."

International studies scholar Brian Reynolds Myers accused Cumings of engaging in apologia for North Korea, arguing that he whitewashed the conditions of the country's kwanliso concentration camps and overstated North Korea's economic achievements, and asserted that several of Cumings's claims were contradicted by emerging evidence. While Myers acknowledged the value of Cumings's criticism of U.S. foreign policy, he stated, "Cumings is too emotional to get the job done. His compulsion to prove conservative opinion wrong on every point inspires him to say things unworthy of any serious historian...and to waste space refuting long-forgotten canards and misconceptions". Cumings himself has rejected the "revisionist" label.

== Bibliography ==
- The Origins of the Korean War (vol I). Princeton University Press, 1981.
- The Origins of the Korean War (vol II). Princeton University Press, 1990.
- Korea: The Unknown War by Jon Halliday and Bruce Cumings, London: Viking Press, 1988. Brief "photojournalism" account of the Korean War with many photographs.
- War and Television. Verso, 1993.
- Korea's Place in the Sun: A Modern History. Norton, 1997.
- Parallax Visions: Making Sense of American-East Asian Relations. Duke University Press, 1999, paperback 2002.
- North Korea: Another Country. The New Press, 2004.
- co-author, Inventing the Axis of Evil. The New Press, 2005.
- Dominion from Sea to Sea: Pacific Ascendancy and American Power (New Haven: Yale University Press, 2009).
- The Korean War: A History. Modern Library Chronicles, 2010.

Articles (selected)

- "The Political Economy of Chinese Foreign Policy," Modern China (October 1979), pp. 411–461
- "Chinatown: Foreign Policy and Elite Realignment," in Thomas Ferguson and Joel Rogers, eds., The Hidden Election (Pantheon Books, 1981), pp. 196–231.
- "Corporatism in North Korea," Journal of Korean Studies (no. 4, 1983), 1–32.
- "The Origins and Development of the Northeast Asian Political Economy: Industrial Sectors, Product Cycles, and Political *Consequences," International Organization (winter 1984), pp. 1–40.
- "Power and Plenty in Northeast Asia," World Policy Journal (winter 1987–88), pp. 79–106
- "The abortive abertura: South Korea in the light of Latin American experience". New Left Review. I (173). New Left Review. January–February 1989.
- "Illusion, Critique, Responsibility: The Revolution of `89 in West and East," in Daniel Chirot, ed., The Revolution of `89 (University of Washington Press, 1991)
- "The Seventy Years' Crisis and the Logic of a Trilateral `New World Order,'" World Policy Journal (Spring 1991)
- "Silent But Deadly: Sexual Subordination in the U.S.-Korean Relationship," in Saundra Pollock Sturdevant and Brenda Stoltzfus, Let the Good Times Roll: Prostitution and the U.S. Military in Asia (New York, The New Press, 1992).
- "`Revising Postrevisionism': Or, The Poverty of Theory in Diplomatic History," Diplomatic History, 17/4 (fall 1993), pp. 539–70.
- "Global Realm With No Limit, Global Realm With No Name," Radical History Review (fall 1993).
- "Japan's Position in the World System," in Andrew Gordon, ed., Postwar Japan as History (Berkeley, University of California Press, 1994), pp. 34–63.
- "Archaeology, Descent, Emergence: Japan in American Hegemony, 1900–1950," in H.D. Harootunian and Masao Miyoshi, eds., Japan in the World (Duke University Press, 1994).
- "The World Shakes China," The National Interest, no. 43 (spring 1996), pp. 28–41.
- "Pikyojôk simin sahoe wa minjujuûi" [Civil Society and Democracy: A Comparative Inquiry], Ch'angjak kwa Pip'yông [Creation and Criticism], (Seoul, May 1996)
- "Nichibei Senso, Hajimari to Owari” [The U.S.-Japan War, Beginning and End], in Kojima Noboru, ed., Jinrui wa senso wo Husegeruka [Can Humankind Prevent War?] (Tokyo: Bungei Shunju, 1996).
- "Time to End the Korean War," The Atlantic Monthly (February 1997), pp. 71–79.
- "The Korean crisis and the end of 'late' development". New Left Review. I (231). New Left Review. September–October 1998.
- "CNN's Cold War," The Nation (October 19, 1998), pp. 25–31.
- “Still the American Century,” British Journal of International Studies, (winter 1999), pp. 271–299.
- “The Asian Crisis, Democracy, and the End of 'Late' Development,” in T. J. Pempel. ed., The Politics of the Asian Economic Crisis (Cornell University Press, 1999), pp. 17–44.
- “Web with No Spider, Spider with No Web: The Genealogy of the Developmental State,” in Meredith Woo-Cumings, ed., The Developmental State (Cornell University Press, 2000).
- "The last hermit". New Left Review. II (6). New Left Review. November–December 2000.

Review of The End of North Korea by Nicholas Eberstadt.

- “Occurrence at Nogun-ri Bridge: An Inquiry into the History and Memory of a Civil War,” Critical Asian Studies, 33:4 (2001), pp. 509–526.
- “Black September, Adolescent Nihilism, and National Security,” in Craig Calhoun, Paul Price, and Ashley Timmer, Understanding September 11 (The New Press, 2002).
- “Wrong Again: The U.S. and North Korea," London Review of Books, v. 25, no. 3 (December 2003), pp. 9–12.
- “Time of Illusion: Post-Cold War Visions of the World,” in Ellen Schrecker, ed., Cold War Triumphalism: The Misuse of History After the Fall of Communism (The New Press, 2004), pp. 71–102.
