= Alexander Goldenweiser (anthropologist) =

Russian-born U.S. anthropologist and sociologist

- Born: February 10, 1880; Kiev, Ukraine
- Died: July 6, 1940 (aged 60); Portland, Oregon

Academic background
- Education: Columbia University
- Doctoral advisor: Franz Boas

Alexander Aleksandrovich Goldenweiser (10 February [O.S. 29 January] 1880 – July 6, 1940) was a Russian-born U.S. anthropologist and sociologist.

== Biography ==
Alexander Alexandrovich Goldenweiser was born in Kiev, Ukraine, in 1880. He emigrated to the United States in 1900. He studied anthropology under Franz Boas, and earned his AB degree from Columbia University in 1902, his AM degree in 1904, and his Ph.D. in 1910.

In addition to many books, articles, and reviews, Goldenweiser taught at the following institutions: Lecturer, Anthropology, Columbia University, 1910–1919; New School for Social Research, NY, 1919–1926; Lecturer, Rand School of Social Science, 1915–1929; Professor, Thought and Culture, Oregon State System of Higher Education, Portland Extension, 1930–1938; Visiting professor, University of Wisconsin–Madison, 1937–1938; Professor, University of Washington, 1923; Visiting professor of sociology, Reed College, 1933–1939.

Among his other contributions, Goldenweiser introduced the term "involution" to social sciences research. It was applied by Clifford Geertz in his Agricultural Involution.

He died on July 6, 1940, in Portland, Oregon.

== Works ==
- Totemism; An analytical study, 1910
- Early civilization, An Introduction to Anthropology, 1922
- Robots or Gods, 1931
- Anthropology, An Introduction to Primitive Culture, 1937
- History, psychology and culture, 1937
