= The Great Divergence (book) =

2000 book by Kenneth Pomeranz

- Author: Kenneth Pomeranz
- Language: English
- Subject: History/History of industrialisation Economics/Economic history of the world
- Genre: Non-fiction
- Published: 2000 (Princeton University Press)
- Publication date: February 22, 2000
- ISBN: 0-691-00543-5

The Great Divergence: China, Europe, and the Making of the Modern World Economy is a 2000 nonfiction book by Kenneth Pomeranz, published by Princeton University Press. Pomeranz argues that the most advanced regions of Europe and Asia had achieved comparable levels of economic development by the early nineteenth century and faced similar resource constraints, especially on the use of productive land. Only after 1800, as a result of its natural endowments of coal and acquisition of colonial possessions, did Western Europe (Britain) begin to move ahead of Asia (the Yangtze Delta). The book has been the subject of intense academic debate and helped to popularize both the term and the study of the Great Divergence in world history.

The book won the John K. Fairbank Prize for 2000. It was a joint winner for World History Association Book Prize of 2000.

== Reception ==
Pomeranz's book has been widely praised and critiqued for its contributions to the study of the Great Divergence. It is often credited as one of the key pieces of work that form the "California School" of economic history. Thinkers of the school, like Pomeranz, argue the divergence between the economies of China and Western Europe occurred much later than previously argued and largely branch away from the Euro-centric arguments that dominated the 1900s starting with Max Weber's The Protestant Ethic and the Spirit of Capitalism.

In Prasannan Parthasarathi's review of the book, he praises it for its unique dive into 18th century ecological and labor data, as well as Pomeranz's ability to not retroactively project China's economic decline in the 19th and early 20th century into the 18th century. Parthasarathi critiques Pomeranz's stance that ecological factors were the main driver of British industrialization. Parthasarathi points out that British charcoal prices during the time remained relatively steady, arguing that the British had not yet been forced by ecological limits to rely on coal. He points to innovations in technology like the spinning jenny and changes in metallurgical practices as the key driver in the reliance on coal.
