= Kären Wigen =

American historian

- Born: Kären Esther Wigen; December 29, 1958 (age 67); East Lansing, Michigan, United States
- Occupations: historian, geographer, author, educator, academic
- Notable work: The Making of a Japanese Periphery, 1750-1920 (1995)
- Spouse: Martin W. Lewis
- Awards: John K. Fairbank Prize (1992)
- Years active: 1990—present
- Known for: studying Japanese history and the history of cartography
- Title: Frances and Charles Field Professor of history

Academic background
- Education: Japanese literature degree (University of Michigan, 1980), PhD in Geography (University of California at Berkeley, 1990)
- Alma mater: University of California at Berkeley

Academic work
- Institutions: Stanford University
- Main interests: The history of Japan, cartographic history, and global maritime history
- Notable works: The Making of a Japanese Periphery, 1750-1920 (1995); The Myth of Continents: A Critique of Metageography (1997); A Malleable Map: Geographies of Restoration in Central Japan, 1600-1912 (2010)

Kären Esther Wigen (born December 29, 1958) is an American historian, geographer, author and educator. She is the Frances and Charles Field Professor of history at Stanford University.

== Early life and education ==
Wigen was born in East Lansing, Michigan and grew up in Ohio. Her father was a physicist. When she was thirteen, Wigen's father was invited to work for six months in Japan. The family moved with him and stayed in Kobe. Wigen and her two sisters started studying Japanese at a local Canadian school. At the age of sixteen, she moved back to Japan during her senior year of high school. Her final year of secondary education was spent at Seikyo Gakuin High School in the city of Kawachinagano in western Japan. She graduated from the University of Michigan in 1980, where she studied Japanese literature. Her undergraduate thesis, a translation of Shōtarō Yasuoka's A View by the Sea was published by Columbia University Press in 1984 and won the Japan–U.S. Friendship Commission Prize for the Translation of Japanese Literature. Wigen earned her doctorate at the University of California at Berkeley in geography in 1990.

== Career ==
Wigen taught at Duke University beginning in 1990. As of 2023, she is Frances and Charles Field Professor of History, Stanford University. She specializes in East Asia, and she teaches Japanese history and history of cartography. Wigen collaborated on projects with the David Rumsey Map Center, located in Stanford's Green Library, which opened for public in April 2016. The center showcases a collection of 150,000 maps donated by real-estate developer and map collector David Rumsey. Accumulated over 40 years, the diverse collection includes atlases, globes, and children's maps, with a particular focus on North and South America. In a statement to the Stanford Daily, Wigen said: "The center addresses one of the key concerns of historians in the computer age: How are we going to make sure key materials survive?"

== Works ==
Wigen's first book, The Making of a Japanese Periphery, 1750-1920 (1995), explores the Ina Valley of southern Nagano Prefecture in Japan and how the silk industry transformed it. She argues that the processes that generated these changes, especially local industrial development and political centralization, contributed to Japan's rise to imperial power. The Making of Japanese Periphery, 1750-1920 won the 1992 John K. Fairbank Prize of the American Historical Association.

Her second book, The Myth of Continents: A Critique of Metageography (1997), co-authored with Martin Lewis, explains why the present system of classifying certain landmasses as "continents" is comparatively recent and derived more from historical accident and political concerns than from natural geographical features.

Wigen examined Nagano prefecture as a whole in her third book,, A Malleable Map: Geographies of Restoration in Central Japan, 1600-1912 (2010), which explores the roles of cartography, chorography, and regionalism. A Malleable Map, wrote one reviewer, examines how "protoindustrial enterprises" such as sericulture and papercraft appeared on maps and reflected larger economic and political changes over roughly four centuries from the Tokugawa period through the Meiji period. Wigen focuses on how the relationship between regional and national identities "played an integral role in the creation of modern Japan". She argues that the pictorial and nonpictorial ways in which the geographical location of Shinano was shown redefined the ways in which people conceived of the place. These ways were "malleable" because they changed according to the needs and priorities of Tokugawa shoguns, merchants, Meiji officials, travelers, and scholars.

In April 2015, she delivered the Edwin O. Reischauer Lectures at Harvard University on the topic "Where in the World? Mapmaking at the Asia-Pacific Margin, 1600-1900."

As an editor, Wigen worked on scholarly books on the history of Japan, cartographic history, and global maritime history. These include Seascapes: Maritime Histories, Littoral Cultures, and Trans-Oceanic Exchanges (co-editor with Jerry H. Bentley and Renate Bridenthal), Cartographic Japan: A History in Maps (co-edited with Fumiko Sugimoto and Cary Karacas), and Time in Maps: From the Early Modern Era to our Digital Age (co-edited with Caroline Winterer). Cartographic Japan won the Choice Outstanding Academic Titles award from the Association of College and Research Libraries.

=== List of major publications ===
==== Books ====
- —— (1995). The Making of a Japanese Periphery, 1750-1920. Berkeley, Calif.: University of California Press.
- ——; Lewis, Martin W. (1997). The Myth of Continents : A Critique of Metageography. Berkeley: University of California Press. ISBN 0520207424.
- —— (2010). A Malleable Map: Geographies of Restoration in Central Japan, 1600-1912. Berkeley: University of California Press. ISBN 9780520259188.

==== As an editor ====
- ——; Bentley, Jerry H.; Bridenthal, Renate (2007). Seascapes: Maritime Histories, Littoral Cultures, and Transoceanic Exchanges. Honolulu: University of Hawai'i Press. ISBN 9780824830274.
- ——; Sugimoto, Fumiko; Karacas, Cary (2016). Cartographic Japan: A History in Maps. Chicago: University of Chicago Press. ISBN 9780226073057.
- ——; Winterer, Caroline (2020). Time in Maps: From the Early Modern Era to the Digital Age. Chicago: University of Chicago Press. ISBN 9780226718590.

== Personal life ==
Wigen married Martin W. Lewis on August 13, 1983. They collaborated on the 1997 book, The Myth of Continents among other endeavors.
