= Kenneth Pomeranz =

American historian

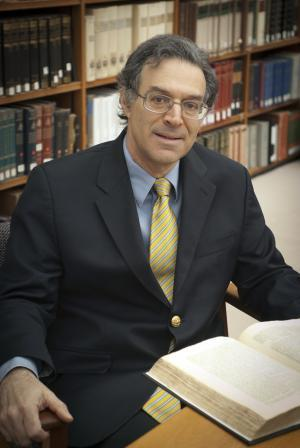
- At American Historical Association, 2014
- Born: November 4, 1958 (age 68)

Academic background
- Education: Cornell University (BA); Yale University (PhD)

Academic work
- Main interests: Comparison of China to industrial Europe (Great Divergence); Trade history
- Notable works: The Great Divergence

Kenneth Pomeranz, FBA (born November 4, 1958) is University Professor of History at the University of Chicago. He received his B.A. from Cornell University in 1980, where he was a Telluride Scholar, and his Ph.D. from Yale University in 1988, where he was a student of Jonathan Spence. He then taught at the University of California, Irvine, for more than 20 years. He was elected a Fellow of the American Academy of Arts & Sciences in 2006. In 2013–2014 he was the president of the American Historical Association. Pomeranz has been described as a major figure in the California School of economic history.

== Selected publications ==
=== Books ===
- The Great Divergence: China, Europe, and the Making of the Modern World Economy. Princeton University Press, 2000. John K. Fairbank Prize 2001. Joint winner, World History Association Best book of 2000.
- The World that Trade Created: Society, Culture and the World Economy, 1400 to the Present. M. E. Sharpe: 1999.
- The Making of a Hinterland: State, Society and Economy in Inland North China, 1853–1937. University of California Press, 1993. John K. Fairbank Prize 1994.

=== Edited volumes ===
- The Pacific in the Age of Early Industrialization. Farnham England: Ashgate/Variorum, 2009.
- with McNeill, J. R., (2015). The Cambridge World History: Production, Destruction, and Connection, 1750 to the present. 1. Cambridge: Cambridge University Press.
- with Barker, G., Benjamin, C., Bentley, J. H., Christian, D., Goucher, C., Kedar, B. Z., Mcneill, J. R., Yoffee, N. (2015). The Cambridge World History: Structures, Spaces, and Boundary Making. Cambridge: Cambridge University Press.
- China in 2008: A Year of Great Significance. (co-ed.). Lanham: Rowman & Littlefield Publishers, 2009.

=== Articles and chapters in edited volumes ===
- The environment and world history. (co-ed.) Berkeley: University of California Press, 2009.
- “Orthopraxy, orthodoxy, and the goddess(es) of Taishan [examination of the Bixia yuanjun cult].” Modern China 33.1 (2007) 22–46.
- “Region and world in economic history: the early modern / modern divide” Transactions of the International Conference of Eastern Studies 52 (2007) 41–55.
- “Standards of living in eighteenth-century China: regional differences, temporal trends, and incomplete evidence” In: Allen, Robert C.; Bengtsson, Tommy; Dribe, Martin, eds. Living standards in the past: new perspectives on well-being in Asia and Europe. (Oxford; New York: Oxford University Press, 2005): 23–54.
- “Women's work and the economics of respectability [boundaries]” In: Goodman, Bryna; Larson, Wendy, eds. Gender in motion: divisions of labor and cultural change in late imperial and modern China (Lanham, Md.: Rowman and Littlefield, 2005): 239–263.
- “Women's work, family, and economic development in Europe and East Asia: long-term trajectories and contemporary comparisons” In: Arrighi, Giovanni; Hamashita, Takeshi; Selden, Mark, eds. The resurgence of East Asia: 500, 150 and 50 year perspectives (London; New York: Routledge, 2003): 124–172.
- “Facts are stubborn things: a response to Philip Huang” Journal of Asian Studies 62.1 (February 2003): 167–181.
- “Political economy and ecology on the eve of industrialization: Europe, China, and the global conjuncture” American Historical Review 107.2 (April 2002) 425–446.
- “Beyond the East-West binary: resituating development paths in the eighteenth-century world” Journal of Asian Studies 61.2 (May 2002) 539–590.
- “Is there an East Asian development path? Long-term comparisons, constraints, and continuities” Journal of the Economic and Social History of the Orient 44, pt.3 (Aug 2001) 322–362.
- “Re-thinking the late imperial Chinese economy: development, disaggregation and decline, circa 1730-1930” Itinerario 24.3-4 (2000) 29–74.
- "Ritual Imitation and Political Identity in North China: The late Imperial Legacy and the Chinese National State Revisited," Twentieth Century China 23:1 Fall, 1997.
- "Power, Gender and Pluralism in the cult of the Goddess of Taishan," in R. Bin Wong, Theodore Huters, and Pauline Yu, eds., Culture and State in Chinese History (Palo Alto, CA: Stanford University Press, 1997).
- “"Traditional' Chinese business forms revisited: family, firm, and financing in the history of the Yutang Company of Jining, 1779-1956.” Late Imperial China 18.1 (June 1997): 1–38.
- “Local interest story: political power and regional differences in the Shandong capital market, 1900-1937” In: Rawski, Thomas G.; Li, Lillian M., eds. Chinese history in economic perspective(Berkeley: University of California Press, 1992) 295–318.
- "Water to Iron, Widows to Warlords: the Handam Rain Shrine in Modern Chinese History," Late Imperial China 12.1 (June 1991) 62–99.

== Awards and honors ==
- 1994 John K. Fairbank Prize for best book in East Asian history
- 1997 John Simon Guggenheim Memorial Foundation Fellowship
- 2001 World History Association Book Prize
- 2001 John K. Fairbank Prize for best book in East Asian history
- 2011-12 Fellow at the Institute for Advanced Study in Princeton, New Jersey
- 2017, Elected Corresponding Fellow of the British Academy (FBA), the United Kingdom's national academy for the humanities and social sciences.
- 2019 Dan David Prize
- 2021 Toynbee Prize
