= Rebecca Young (American politician) =

American politician (1934–2008)

Rebecca Conrad Young (February 28, 1934 – November 18, 2008) was a Wisconsin politician and legislator.

Born in Clairton, Pennsylvania, Young graduated from University of Michigan and a MAT from Harvard University. She received her law degree from University of Wisconsin–Madison in 1983. Young served on the Dane County, Wisconsin Board of Supervisors, and the Madison, Wisconsin School Board. Young also served in the Wisconsin State Assembly from 1985 to 1997.

Young was diagnosed with cancer in 1997, forcing her to retire from her political career, and she died at her home in Madison in 2008.
