= Louise Young (historian) =

American author and Japanese historian

Louise Young is an author, historian of modern Japan, and professor at the University of Wisconsin-Madison. She received her B.A. from the University of Wisconsin-Madison, then her M.A. and Ph.D. from Columbia University.

She has acted as a visiting researcher to Tokyo University, Waseda University, and Kyoto University.

== Books ==
- Japan's Total Empire: Manchuria and the Culture of Wartime Imperialism (1998) (won the John K. Fairbank Prize and the Hiromi Arisawa prize)
- Beyond the Metropolis: Second Cities and Modern Life in Interwar Japan (2013)
