= Tetsuo Najita =

American historian (1936–2021)

Tetsuo "Tets" Najita (奈地田 哲夫, Najita Tetsuo; March 30, 1936 – January 11, 2021) was an American historian.

== Biography ==
A nisei, Najita was raised in Hawaii. He graduated from Grinnell College in 1958, and was named a Woodrow Wilson Fellow. While in Grinnell, he became a member of Phi Beta Kappa. Najita completed a doctorate at Harvard University in 1965.

Upon finishing his studies, Najita began teaching at Carleton College. He left Carleton in 1966, and became an associate professor at the University of Wisconsin. In 1969, Najita joined the University of Chicago faculty, and was later named a Robert S. Ingersolll Distinguished Service Professor in History and East Asian Languages and Civilizations.

Over the course of his career, Najita received a Guggenheim Fellowship in 1981, and was named to the American Academy of Arts and Sciences in 1993. Grinnell College honored Najita with an alumni award in 1998. Five years after his retirement from the institution, the University of Chicago inaugurated the Tetsuo Najita Distinguished Lecture series in 2007.

Najita died at his home in Kamuela, Hawaii, on January 11, 2021, after a long illness.

== Bibliography ==
- Hara Kei in the Politics of Compromise, 1905-1915 (Harvard University Press, 1967).
- Japan: the Intellectual Foundations of Modern Japanese Politics (Prentice-Hall, 1974).
- Visions of Virtue in Tokugawa Japan: the Kaitokudo Merchant Academy of Osaka (University of Chicago Press, 1987).
- Ordinary Economies in Japan: a Historical Perspective, 1750-1950 (University of California Press, 2009).
- Tokugawa Political Writings, (Cambridge University Press, 1998).
- Japanese Thought in the Tokugawa Period, 1600-1868: Methods and Metaphors, co-edited with Irwin Scheiner, (University of Chicago Press, 1978).
- Conflict in Modern Japanese History: the Neglected Tradition, co-edited with J. Victor Koschmann, (Princeton University Press, 1982).
