= Matsukata =

Matsukata (written: 松方) is a Japanese surname. Notable people with the surname include:

- Hiroki Matsukata (松方 弘樹, 1942–2017), Japanese actor
- Matsukata Masayoshi (松方 正義, 1835–1924), 4th and 6th Prime Minister of Japan
- Saburō Matsukata (松方 三郎, 1899–1973), Japanese Scout leader

== See also ==
- Haru Matsukata Reischauer, journalist, granddaughter of Matsukata Masayoshi and wife of Edwin O. Reischauer
- Miye Matsukata, jewelry designer
- Tane Matsukata, educator
