= Miye Matsukata =

Japanese-American jewelry designer

- Born: January 27, 1922; Tokyo, Empire of Japan
- Died: February 16, 1981 (aged 59); Massachusetts General Hospital, Boston, US
- Occupations: Jewelry designer; metalsmith
- Relatives: Haru M. Reischauer (sister); Tane Matsukata (sister); Edwin O. Reischauer (brother-in-law); Kōjirō Matsukata (uncle); Saburō Matsukata (uncle); Arai Ryoichiro (grandfather); Matsukata Masayoshi (grandfather)
- Family: Matsukata Family

Miye Matsukata (Note: Matsukata's first name is also cited as Miyeko) (January 27, 1922 – February 16, 1981) was a Japanese-American jewelry designer and metalsmith based in Boston. She was one of the founders of Atelier Janiye and later became the sole owner.

== Early life and education ==
Matsukata was born on January 27, 1922 in Tokyo to Shokuma Matsukata and Miyo Matsukata (née Arai). One of six siblings, Matsukata was the younger sister of Haru M. Reischauer, a writer, and Tane Matsukata, an educator and founder of Nishimachi International School. The maternal granddaughter of the silk importer Arai Ryoichiro, through her father Matsukata was a member of the Matsukata family. Matsukata was the paternal granddaughter of the Matsukata Masayoshi, a politician and twice Prime Minister of Japan, and the niece of Kōjirō Matsukata, businessman and Western art collector, and Saburō Matsukata, a journalist, businessman and mountaineer.

Miye and her siblings grew up in a bifurcated culture. She spent her youth in Tokyo, Japan, but was under strong influence by Western culture and education. Miye and her siblings studied at Principia College, in Illinois. Four of the children including Miye, remained in United States after.

Miye Matsukata majored in fine arts at Principia College in Illinois from 1940-1944. She would then attend the School of the Museum of Fine Arts, Boston, focusing her study on metalsmith and graduating in 1949. During her graduate studies she traveled on scholarship in Scandinavia.

== Career ==
Matsukata designed jewelry in Boston, and established Atelier Janiye (sometimes written as Atelier Janiyé) in the 1949, co-owned with Naomi Katz Harris and Janice Whipple Williams after graduating. The name 'Janiye' originated from the combinations of the three designers first name. In 1958, the group association disbanded and Matsukata took sole ownership of Atelier Janiye. James Hubbard was the business manager and agent, while Nancy Michel, Alexandra Watkins, and Yoshiko Yamamoto created the jewelry based on designs by Matsukata.

She was awarded another travel grant to study goldsmithing techniques in the Middle East and in Greece in 1966. In 1968, she organized an exhibition of new American art jewelry at the Odakyu Department Store in Tokyo. She was also involved in the Society of North American Goldsmiths. She taught several classes at the Haystack Mountain School of Crafts in Deer Isle, Maine in 1976.

Her works was characterized by a mix of media, using beads, stones, coins, glass, enamel, fabric, and other materials in addition to unconventional uses of gold or silver. "Unlike much of the found object jewelry made during the 1960s and '70s," observes one scholar, "Matsukata's work did not celebrate cast-off goods, invoke shamanic tradition, or make sly pop cultural references."

== Personal life ==
Matsukata was sister-in-law of the diplomat Edwin O. Reischauer through her sister Hara.

On February 16, 1981, Matsukata died at Massachusetts General Hospital in Boston aged 59.

== Legacy ==
Her work is included in the collection of the Smithsonian American Art Museum. Her papers, including sketchbooks, journals, business records, correspondence, and photographs, are in the Archives of American Art, Smithsonian Institution.

Atelier Janiye continued as a jewelry studio under Matsukata's associates, Nancy Michel and Alexandra Solowij Watkins, until they retired in 2014. In 2011 a show featuring and inspired by her work, "Atelier Janiyé: And the Legacy of Master Jeweler Miyé Matsukata", was exhibited at the Fuller Craft Museum.
