= Kent E. Calder =

American professor (born 1948)

- Born: April 18, 1948 (age 78); Utah, U.S.

Education
- Education: University of Utah (B.A.); Harvard University (M.A., Ph.D.)

Philosophical work
- Institutions: Paul H. Nitze School of Advanced International Studies; Edwin O. Reischauer Center for East Asian Studies; Johns Hopkins University; Princeton University; Harvard University
- Main interests: International relations, political economy, energy security, Japan, Korea, East Asia

Kent E. Calder (born April 18, 1948) was the interim dean of the Johns Hopkins School of Advanced International Studies (SAIS), serves as the director of the Edwin O. Reischauer Center for East Asian Studies, and is also the Edwin O. Reischauer Professor of East Asian Studies at SAIS. Calder previously served as the vice dean for faculty affairs and international research cooperation at SAIS.

Calder is the author of 15 major books and numerous scholarly and popular articles. "Crisis and Compensation" (1988) received the Ohira Memorial Prize and the Arisawa Memorial Prize of the American Association of University Publishers. "Pacific Defense" (1996) was the first publication by an American to receive the Mainichi Grand Prix in Asia-Pacific Studies (1997) for its analysis of how economic change is transforming the U.S.–East Asia security equation. "Super Continent: the Logic of Eurasian Integration" was published in 2019. Calder's works have been translated into five foreign languages, including Japanese, Korean, Chinese, Portuguese, and Mongolian. His book Super Continent received two awards: Financial Times Book of the Year in Politics in 2019; and the Okakura Tenshin International Prize in Eurasian Studies in 2020.

== History ==
Calder served from 1997 to 2001 as special advisor to the U.S. ambassador to Japan, working under Walter Mondale, Thomas Foley, and briefly Howard Baker. He has also held staff positions with the U.S. Congress and the Federal Trade Commission, serving as a member of the Council on Foreign Relations since 1990. Calder joined Johns Hopkins SAIS in 2003, serving as director of the Reischauer Center for East Asian Studies (2003–present); Asia Programs (2016–2018); and as Vice Dean (2018–2020).

Calder taught for two decades at Princeton University (1983 –2003), where he holds emeritus standing, after teaching for four years at Harvard University, where he earned his Ph.D. At Harvard, he was the first executive director of the university's program on US-Japan Relations, working with Edwin O. Reischauer and Hisashi Owada. A specialist on Japanese trade and industrial policy in his early years, Calder focused on how party politics and socio-economic structure affect functioning of the Japanese political economy. From 1990 to 2003, after receiving tenure at Princeton, Calder directed the university's Program on U.S.-Japan Relations in the Woodrow Wilson School of Public and International Affairs.

== Education ==
Calder received his Ph.D. in government from Harvard University in 1979, where he worked under the director of Edwin Reischauer. Apart from the Ohira, Arisawa, and Mainichi Asia-Pacific Prizes for his academic work, Calder also received the Academia Prize of the Japan Society of Scholars (2012); the Eagle on the Sun Award of the Japan Chamber of Commerce and Industry (2015); and the Urasenke Tea Culture Prize (2018). The last of these was a special award for his efforts in promoting international tea-culture diplomacy. In 2014, Calder was also awarded the Order of the Rising Sun, Gold Rays with Neck Ribbon, by the Japanese government for his contribution to the development of Japan studies in the United States and the enhancement of trans-Pacific understanding.

== Selected publications ==
=== Books ===
- Global Political Cities: Actors and Arenas of Influence in International Affairs (Brookings Institution, 2021)
- Super Continent: The Logic of Eurasian Integration (Stanford: Stanford University Press, 2019)
- Circles of Compensation: Economic Growth and the Globalization of Japan (Stanford: Stanford University Press, 2018).
- Singapore: Smart City, Smart State (Washington, D.C.: Brookings Institution Press, 2016).
- Asia in Washington: Exploring the Penumbra of Transnational Power (Washington, D.C.: Brookings Institution Press, 2014).
- The New Continentalism: Energy and Twenty-First Century Eurasian Geopolitics (New Haven: Yale University Press, May 2012).
- The Making of Northeast Asia co-author with Min Ye (Stanford: Stanford University Press, 2010).
- Pacific Alliance: Reviving U.S.-Japan Relations (New Haven: Yale University Press, 2009)
- East Asian Multilateralism: Prospects for Regional Stability, co-editor with Francis Fukuyama (Baltimore: Johns Hopkins University Press, 2008)
- Korea's Energy Insecurities: Comparative and Regional Perspectives (Washington DC: Korea Economic Institute of America, 2005).
- Embattled Garrisons: Comparative Base Politics and American Globalism (Princeton: Princeton University Press, 2007).
- Pacific Defense: Arms, Energy, and America's Future in Asia (New Haven:Yale University Press, 1996).
- Strategic Capitalism: Private Business and Public Purpose in Japanese Industrial Finance (Princeton, New Jersey: Princeton University Press, 1993).
- Crisis and Compensation: Public Policy and Political Stability in Japan, 1949–1986 (Princeton, New Jersey: Princeton University Press, 1988).
- The Eastasia Edge, co-author with Roy Hofheinz (New York: Basic Books, 1982).

=== Articles ===
- The global logic of a Tokyo-Tehran tête-à-tête
- Energy is the key to 21st century Eurasian geopolitics
- Japan's Energy Angst and the Caspian Great Game
- Letter From Tokyo: New Regime, New Relationship? A New Era in U.S.-Japanese Relations
- China and Japan's Simmering Rivalry
- The New Face of Northeast Asia
- Asia's Empty Tank
- Review: Japanese Foreign Economic Policy Formation: Explaining the Reactive State
- Coping with North Korea's Energy Future: KEDO and Beyond
- Resource Development and Arctic Governance: An American Perspective
- U.S. Climate Policy and Prospects for US-Japan Cooperation
- Alliance Endangered? Challenges from the Changing Political-Economic Context of U.S.-Japan Relations
- Beneath the Eagle's Wings? The Political Economy of Northeast Asian Burden-Sharing in Comparative Perspective
- Coping with energy insecurity: China's response in global perspective
- Halfway to Hegemony: Japan's Tortured Trajectory

== Selected lectures and interviews ==
Available online in audio/video with external links:

- Beyond Fukushima: Japan's Emerging Energy and Environmental Challenges, April 5, 2012, at Foreign Policy Research Institute, Philadelphia.
- The New Continentalism: Energy and Twenty-First-Century Eurasian Geopolitics, July 5, 2012, at Asan Institute, Seoul, South Korea.
- Dr. Calder: The New Continentalism: Energy and 21st Century Eurasian Geopolitics, September 17, 2012, at Johns Hopkins SAIS, Washington, DC.
- The Making of Northeast Asia, at the East West Center, Washington DC.
- Dr. Kent E. Calder on NHK World Wave, December 19, 2011
- Public Lecture: Kent Calder Book Talk: The Making of Northeast Asia
- Managing Risk and Security in East Asia
- ケント・カルダー ジョンズ・ホプキンス大学高等国際問題研究大学院, June 14, 2013, at Japan National Press Club,
- ケント・カルダー_5_日本経済再生の処方せんは, interviewed by Japanese media NHK on December 17, 2012.
- シリーズ「日米中」①ケント・カルダー氏 October 19, 2009 at Japan National Press Club
