= Nishimachi International School =

International School in Tokyo, Japan

- 西町インターナショナルスクール

Location
- 2-14-7 Moto Azabu; Minato-ku, Tokyo 106-0046; Tokyo, Japan; Japan; 35.6536°N 139.7305°E

Information
- Type: International school, Private school
- Established: 1949
- Head of school: Owain Phillips
- Grades: K - 9
- Colors: Blue and White
- Mascot: Vikings
- Accreditation: WASC, JCIS, EARCOS
- Website: Nishimachi International School Website

Nishimachi International School (西町インターナショナルスクール), established in 1949, is an international school located in the Azabu area of Tokyo, Japan. Co-educational, non-sectarian, private K-9 day school. The main language of instruction is in English. Japanese is taught to all students every day from beginner to native speaker level.

== History ==
Nishimachi International School was founded by Tané Matsukata, granddaughter of former prime minister of Japan Matsukata Masayoshi, and sister of Haru M. Reischauer, wife of former United States ambassador to Japan Edwin O. Reischauer.

Tané Matsukata returned to Japan after seventeen years in the U.S., where she received her education and spent the war years. She found Tokyo still badly scarred from the war although the slow process of rebuilding had begun. In discussion with friends, she began to realize the important role that education would play in the reconstruction process. Together they explored the alternatives and concluded that a new approach other than traditional education was needed, one that stressed the human side of learning and had peaceful coexistence with others as an objective. Learning a second language, in this case English, was step one in the educational process. They saw this as fundamental to extending the children's understanding beyond the boundaries of their own culture and into other cultures. They hired a teacher for Japanese, and the school that was eventually to become Nishimachi opened its doors to its first four students. Matsukata is related by marriage to the late Harvard professor, Edwin O. Reischauer.

== Details ==
The Nishimachi school year, for grades 1-9, begins on August 21, and finishes on June 12. Middle school students enjoy dances, a week-long ski trip, Kazuno, and many other holidays and traditions. Nishimachi owns a piece of land in Kazuno, Gunma Prefecture about 3 hours travel away from the city. The land belonged to Ryoichiro Arai, Tané Matsukata's maternal grandfather who was a silk producer. In 1945, the women and children of the Matsukata family moved to this farmhouse to seek refuge from the US bombings of Tokyo. Today, the property has been converted to a camp that includes a main house, a traditional Japanese farmhouse that has been converted for additional sleeping accommodations, and a renovated traditional Japanese storage house (okura)that was used by Ryoichiro Arai. The main house has two rooms and bunk beds on the first floor, and a kitchen and dining room on the second floor. The farmhouse has four rooms of tatami with wooden screens that can be pulled away to open up the room.

== Accreditation ==
Nishimachi International School is accredited by the Western Association of Schools and Colleges (WASC) and the Council of International Schools (CIS), and is a member of the Japan Council of International Schools (JCIS) and the East Asia Regional Council of Overseas School (EARCOS).

== Facilities ==
The campus is located in central Tokyo and comprises six buildings: the Matsukata House, the Ushiba Memorial Gymnasium/auditorium, the kindergarten building in the nearby Moto Azabu Hills complex, the primary building, the upper elementary/middle school building, and the Yashiro Media Center. Matsukata House was the original family residence of Nishimachi's founder, Tané Matsukata, and now serves as the school's main administrative building. The Yashiro Media Center, housed in its own three-floor building, contains about 18,000 books, 70% in English and 30% in Japanese, and uses the Dewey Decimal System. Nishimachi's outdoor education center, Camp Rioichiro Arai "Kazuno," is in Gunma Prefecture, 150 kilometers northwest of Tokyo.

=== Matsukata House ===
The core of the facilities is the Matsukata House, built in 1921 as a three-story wooden colonial style house with a basement. Shokuma and Miyo Matsukata, the parents of Tané Matsukata, commissioned the American architect William M. Vories (1880–1964) to design the house. Takenaka Komuten (the Takenaka Corporation) built the house. Seismic tests in 2008 revealed flaws that resulted in the closure of the house until it could be reinforced in 2009.

== Notable alumni ==
- Conrad Anker (mountaineer)
- Tom Cochran (Obama administration official)
- Shingo Francis (artist, son of artist Sam Francis)
- Joi Ito (former director of MIT Media Lab)
- Mizuko Ito (anthropologist)
- Sachi Parker (actress)
- Leo Rubinfien (photographer)
- Rick Soo (Tohoku Free Blades) (professional hockey player)
- Inga Thommessen (singer/songwriter)
- Naoko Yoshino (harpist)
