= Edwin O. Reischauer Center for East Asian Studies =

Research institute at Johns Hopkins University

Edwin O. Reischauer Center for East Asian Studies at Johns Hopkins University is a research center within the Paul H. Nitze School of Advanced International Studies (SAIS) that supports the research and study of transpacific and intra-Asian relations and seeks to advance mutual understanding between Northeast Asia and the United States.

== History ==
The Reischauer Center was established as the Japan Institute in 1984 in honor of the first Japanese-born and Japanese-speaking U.S. Ambassador to Japan, Edwin Reischauer.

From 1984 through 1990, Reischauer was the Center's Honorary Chair. After his death in 1990, his widow Haru Reischauer assumed the same role, and this continued until her death in 1998. In 2003, Kent E. Calder joined SAIS and became the Center's director.

== Research areas ==
The Reischauer Center for East Asian Studies conducts research on a range of topics impacting the future direction of U.S.-Japan bilateral relations by focusing on the status quo and the lack of various essential policy dialogues between the two countries. Topics include a U.S.-Japan Policy Dialogue, the United States and Japan in Trilateral Contexts, A Changing Washington, Northeast Asian Political Economy, and Asia-Middle East Relationships. The Reischauer Center also hosts visiting scholars from the major nations of the North Pacific to conduct research, deliver lectures, and make submissions to the Asia-Pacific Policy Papers series. In May 2013, the Center instituted the Reischauer Policy Research Fellows Program for recent graduates.

== Selected works ==
The Center's published works encompass a broad range of Asia-related topics, addressing both specialist and popular audiences. It supports the publication of articles, monographs, and books as well, through its Asia-Pacific Leadership Paper Series, Asia-Pacific Policy Paper Series and its US-Japan Yearbook Series.

- A Retrospective of eighty years of the U.S.-Japanese relationship (1985)
- Can history inform policy-making on East Asia?: Two historians offer lessons on the complex U.S.-China-Japan triangle (1997)
- Stabilizing the US-Japan-China Strategic Triangle (2006)
- The Politics of the Futenma Base Issue in Okinawa (2010)
- Central Asia's Oil & Gas Sector Since the 2008 Financial Crisis (2011)
- Politics and Trade Policy in Japan: Trans-Pacific Partnership Negotiations (2015)

Annual Briefing Books

- The United States and Japan in 1986: Can the Partnership Work (1986)
- The United States and Japan in 1987: Conciliation or Confrontation (1987)
- The United States and Japan in 1988: a Time of Transition (1988)
- The United States and Japan in 1989: Managing Interdependence (1989)
- The United States and Japan in 1990: a New World Environment (1990)
- The United States and Japan in 1991: Discord or Dialogue (1991)
- The United States and Japan in 1992: a Quest for New Roles (1992)
- The United States and Japan in 1993: Impact of Domestic change (1993)
- The United States and Japan in 1994: Uncertain Prospects
- The United States and Japan in 1995: a Search for Balance (1995)
- The United States and Japan in 1996: Redefining the Partnership (1996)
- The United States and Japan in 1997: the Partnership Still Matters (1997)
- The United States and Japan in 1998: Adapting to a New Era (1998)
- The United States and Japan in 1999: Coping with Crisis (1999)
- The United States and Japan in 2000: Seeking Focus (2000)
- The United States and Japan in 2001: Expectations and Reality (2001)
- The United States and Japan in 2002: a Turning Point? (2002)
- The United States and Japan in 2003: Navigating Uncharted Waters (2003)
- The United States and Japan in Global Context: 2004 (2004)
- The United States and Japan in Global Context: 2004 (2005)
- The United States and Japan in Global Context: 2006-07 (2007)
- The United States and Japan in Global Context: 2008 (2008)
- The United States and Japan in Global Context: 2009 (2009)
- The United States and Japan in Global Context: 2010 (2010)
- The United States and Japan in Global Context: 2011 (2011)
- The United States and Japan in Global Context: 2012 (2012)
- The United States and Japan in Global Context: 2013 (2013)
- The United States and Japan in Global Context: 2014 (2014)
- The United States and Japan in Global Context: 2015 (2015)

== See also ==
- Edwin O. Reischauer Institute of Japanese Studies at Harvard
