= John Whitney Hall =

American Japanologist (1916–1997)

John Whitney Hall (September 13, 1916 – October 21, 1997) was an American historian of Japan who specialized in pre-modern Japanese history. His life work was recognized by the Japanese government, which awarded him the Order of the Sacred Treasure.

== Early life and education ==
The only son of Congregational missionaries, Hall was born in Kyoto in 1916 and lived in Japan until he was a teenager. Hall moved to the United States to attend Phillips Andover Academy in Andover, Massachusetts, before matriculating at Amherst College, where he majored in American studies. After receiving an A.B. degree in 1939, he returned to Japan as an instructor in English at Doshisha University in Kyoto until 1941.

During the war, he served with the Office of Naval Intelligence, leaving the service with the rank of Lieutenant Commander.

Hall earned his Ph.D. in East Asian languages and literature from Harvard University in 1950. At Harvard, he became one of the first graduate students to study under Edwin O. Reischauer, who was another missionary's son and a pioneering Japan scholar.

== Academic career ==
Hall's obituary in the New York Times described him as "something of an academic entrepreneur" because he was so central in the work of building up the fledgling field of Japanese studies in the years after World War II. In his lifetime, he served as a stalwart bridge linking historians in Japan with historians in the West. Harry Harootunian, a professor of history at New York University and a former student of Hall's, summarizes this view succinctly: "What I think guys like Hall tried to do was de-exoticize the study of Japan. To de-exoticize, anything is to bring it closer to us, to eliminate the distance that we imagine exists between ourselves and the object of our study."

Hall himself explained: "My own fascination with Japanese history lies primarily with the manner in which Japan's political and social institutions have changed and diversified over time and how this fundamentally 'Eastern' culture gave rise to modern world power."

In 1948, Professor Hall began teaching at the University of Michigan, one of the few American universities that had a significant program in his field. He would become director of the Center for Japanese Studies (1957–1960) and a founder of the first American research venture in post-war Japan. Through that program, a field research station in Okayama, Professor Hall spent a year in Japan in 1952 and became the first person to begin examining the voluminous records of one of the daimyo families that had ruled Japan during the early modern period between 1600 and 1868. He became an expert in that period, identifying the seeds of Japan's subsequent industrialization and modernization—findings which challenged the traditional Western view that that period had been nothing more than Japan's rather backward, final feudal age.

His earliest book was Tanuma Okitsugu, 1718–1787. Among other interests, his research focused on the Kamakura period in the history of Japan.

George Wilson Pierson recruited Whitney to join the Yale University faculty as part of a plan to expand the department's curriculum to include a greater emphasis on Asian history. In 1961, he was named as the A. Whitney Griswold Professor of History, a position he held until his retirement in 1983. Five years after arriving at Yale, Hall published his most famous book, Government and Local Power in Japan, 500 to 1700, which traced the development of Okayama during that period and, some say, opened up the first thousand years of Japanese history to the English-speaking world. Although scholarly books rarely have a shelf life of more than a generation, some colleagues assert that Hall's book is in a category all its own.

While at Yale, Hall served as chairman of the history department from 1973 until 1976. He was also the chairman of the East Asian Languages and Literatures Department from 1971 through 1974. In 1983, he retired from the faculty. The university's John W. Hall Lecture Series in Japanese Studies was established in his memory.

During the 1960s and 1970s, Professor Hall became a leader in many of the organizations that were working to build up the field of Japanese studies. These groups were attempting to represent the interests of the field in order to get support from universities, foundations and the Japanese government. Professor Hall's activities included

- Chairman, the Japan-United States Friendship Commission
- Chairman, the United States-Japan Conference on Educational and Cultural Interchange
- Chairman, the Social Science Research Council/Joint Committee on Japanese Studies.

Throughout these years, Professor Hall also worked closely with the Japan Foundation, which was set up by the Japanese government in the 1970s to help American universities establish Japanese studies programs. The Japan Foundation eventually gave $1 million to 10 major universities for activities in the field. Hall was honored with the Japan Foundation Award in 1976.

== Selected works ==
In a statistical overview derived from writings by and about John Whitney Hall, OCLC/WorldCat encompasses roughly 90+ works in 200+ publications in 8 languages and 10,000+ library holdings.

- 1950s
  - Hall, John Whitney. Japanese history; a guide to Japanese reference and research materials. Ann Arbor, University of Michigan Press, 1954.
  - ⸻. Tanuma Okitsugu, 1719–1788, the forerunner of modern Japan. [Harvard-Yenching Institute monograph series, 14]. Cambridge, Harvard University Press, 1955.
- 1960s
  - Hall, John Whitney. Government and local power in Japan, 500 to 1700; a study based on Bizen Province. Princeton, Princeton University Press, 1960.
  - ⸻. Japanese history: new dimensions of approach and understanding. Washington: Service Center for Teachers of History, 1961.
  - ⸻ and Richard K. Beardsley. Twelve doors to Japan. New York, McGraw-Hill, 1965.
  - ⸻. Japanese history; new dimensions of approach and understanding, 2nd ed. Washington, Service Center for Teachers of History, 1966.
  - ⸻ and Marius Jansen, eds. Studies in the institutional history of early modern Japan. Princeton, Princeton University Press, 1968.
  - ⸻. Das Japanische Kaiserreich. Frankfurt-am-Main: Fischer Bücherei GmbH, 1968.
  - ⸻, Beardsley, Richard K., and Robert E. Ward. Village Japan. Chicago, University of Chicago Press, 1969.
- 1970s
  - Hall, John Whitney. Japan, to modern times. New York, Delacorte Press, 1970.
  - ⸻. Japan, from prehistory to modern times. New York, Dell Publ. Co., 1971.
  - ⸻ and Jeffrey P. Mass, eds. Medieval Japan; essays in institutional history. New Haven, Yale University Press, 1974.
  - ⸻. Das Japanische Kaiserreich. Frankfurt is Main: Fischer Taschenbuch Verlag, 1976.
  - ⸻ and Toyoda Takeshi, eds. Japan in the Muromachi age. Berkeley: University of California Press, 1977.
- 1980s
  - Hall, John Whitney, Nagahara Keiji, and Kozo Yamamura, eds. Japan before Tokugawa: political consolidation and economic growth, 1500–1650. Princeton: Princeton University Press, 1981.
  - ⸻ ... et al., eds. The Cambridge History of Japan. Cambridge : Cambridge University Press, 1988-____. [Incomplete contents: v. 1. Ancient Japan / edited by Delmer M. Brown—v. 3. Medieval Japan / edited by Kozo Yamamura—v. 4. Early modern Japan / edited by John Whitney Hall—v. 5. The nineteenth-century / edited by Marius B Jansen—v. 6. The twentieth century / edited by Peter Duus.]

== Honors ==
In 1987, Hall was one of the recipients of American Historical Association's Award for Scholarly Distinction.

- Order of the Sacred Treasure
- Japan Foundation Award
- President, Association for Asian Studies, 1967

=== AAS John Whitney Hall Book Prize ===
The Association for Asian Studies (AAS) Northeast Asia Council (NEAC) presents the John Whitney Hall Book Prize, which has been awarded annually since 1994 for an outstanding English language book published on Japan or Korea. (Note: Since 2010, the James B. Palais Book Prize honors work on Korean subjects.)

== Sources ==
- Conlon, Frank. F. (1997). "Obituary John Whitney Hall, 1916–1997". World History Archives. Hartford Web Publishing.
- Hall, John Whitney (1971). Japan, From Prehistory to Modern Times. Delacorte World History. Vol. 20. New York: Delacorte Press. ISBN 978-0-297-00237-6.
- Hardacre, Helen (1998). The Postwar Development of Japanese Studies in the United States.
- "John Whitney Hall papers, 1930–1999". Yale University Library. Archived from the original on September 9, 2006.
- Mass, Jeffrey P. (February 1998). "John Whitney Hall 1916–1997". The Journal of Asian Studies. 57 (1): 306–310.
- Schulman, Frank Joseph (1970). Japan and Korea: An Annotated Bibliography of Doctoral Dissertations in Western Languages, 1877–1969. London: Routledge. ISBN 978-0-7146-2691-8.
- Scott, Janny (October 27, 1997). "John W. Hall, Historian of Japan, Dies at 81". New York Times.
