= Tane Matsukata =

Japanese educator

- 松方種子
- Tane Matsukata, from the 1941 yearbook of Principia College
- Born: February 18, 1918; Tokyo, Japan
- Died: June 8, 1989 (age 71); Tokyo, Japan
- Other names: Tané Matsukata, Matsukata Taneko
- Occupations: Educator, librarian
- Known for: Founder, Nishimachi International School
- Relatives: Haru M. Reischauer (sister); Miye Matsukata (sister); Matsukata Masayoshi (grandfather); Arai Ryoichiro (grandfather); Edwin O. Reischauer (brother-in-law); Kōjirō Matsukata (uncle)

Tane Matsukata (February 18, 1918 – June 8, 1989; 松方種子)(in kana まつかた たねこ), often written Tané Matsukata or Matsukata Taneko, was a Japanese educator and librarian, founder and principal of the Nishimachi International School in Tokyo.

== Early life and education ==
Matsukata was born in Tokyo, the daughter of Matsukata Shokuma and Matsukata Miyo. She was the granddaughter of Prince Masayoshi Matsukata, on her father's side, and businessman Ryoichiro Arai was her maternal grandfather. Her mother was born in New York City, and was one of the first Japanese adherents to Christian Science.

Matsukata graduated from Principia College in Illinois in 1941, and earned a master's degree in library science from Columbia University. She had four sisters, including jewelry designer Miye Matsukata and Haru Reischauer.

== Career ==
Matsukata worked in the National Diet Library after World War II. She founded the Nishimachi International School in Tokyo in 1949, and was the school's longtime principal. Eleanor Roosevelt mentioned Matsukata and her sister Haru in a 1953 My Day column, saying "They are running a small school where children of eight nations come to learn English. They would like to have this a real international school and it seems to be growing very rapidly so they may have some success." The Tokyo mansion her parents commissioned by American architect Merrell Vories Hitotsuyanagi in the 1920s became one of the school's buildings.

== Death ==
Matsukata died in 1989, aged 71.
