= Gail Lee Bernstein =

American historian (born 1939)

- Born: 1939 (age 86–87)

Academic background
- Education: Barnard College (BA); Radcliffe College (MA); Harvard University (PhD)

Academic work
- Discipline: History
- Sub-discipline: Japanese history
- Institutions: University of Arizona

Gail Lee Bernstein (born 1939) is an American historian who is a professor emerita of history at the University of Arizona. She specializes in the history of Japanese women, and is considered one of the pioneers in this field. Bernstein retired from full-time teaching in 2007.

== Biography ==
Bernstein studied under many of the pioneers of modern Japanese history, including Edwin O. Reischauer and Albert M. Craig. She received her Bachelor of Arts degree from Barnard College in 1959, Master of Arts from Radcliffe College in 1961, and PhD from Harvard University in 1968. Her students have included Yumiko Kawahara and Linnea Gentry Sheehan.

== Selected works ==
- Changing Roles of Women in Rural Japan (1976)
- Haruko's World: A Japanese Farm Woman and Her Community (1985).
- Japanese Marxist: A Portrait of Kawakami Hajime, 1879–1946 (1990), Japanese Translation published in 1991.
- Editor, Recreating Japanese Women, 1600–1945 (1991).
- Isami's House: Three Centuries of a Japanese Family (2005).
- Editor, Public Spheres, Private lives in Modern Japan, 1600–1950: Essays in Honor of Albert Craig (2005)
