= Harvard–Yenching Institute =

Educational institution in Cambridge, United States

Coordinates: 42.377552°N 71.113923°W

Chinese name
- Traditional Chinese: 哈佛燕京學社
- Simplified Chinese: 哈佛燕京学社
- Hanyu Pinyin: Hāfó-Yānjīng Xuéshè
Transcriptions
Standard Mandarin
- Hanyu Pinyin: Hāfó-Yānjīng Xuéshè
- Bopomofo: ㄏㄚ ㄈㄛˊ ㄧㄢ ㄐㄧㄥ ㄒㄩㄝˊ ㄕㄜˋ
- Gwoyeu Romatzyh: Hafor Ianjing Shyuesheh
- Wade–Giles: Ha^{1}-fo^{2} Yen^{1}-ching^{1} Hsüeh^{2}-shê^{4}
- Yale Romanization: Hāfwó Yānjīng Sywéshè
- IPA: [xá.fwǒ jɛ́n.tɕíŋ ɕɥě.ʂɤ̂]
Yue: Cantonese
- Yale Romanization: Hā-faht Yingīng Hohkséh or Hā-faht Yīngīng Hohkséh
- Jyutping: Haa1fat6 Jin3ging1 Hok6se5 or Haa1fat6 Jin1ging1 Hok6se5

Japanese name
- Kanji: ハーバード燕京研究所
Transcriptions
- Romanization: Hābādo-Yenchin kenkyūsho

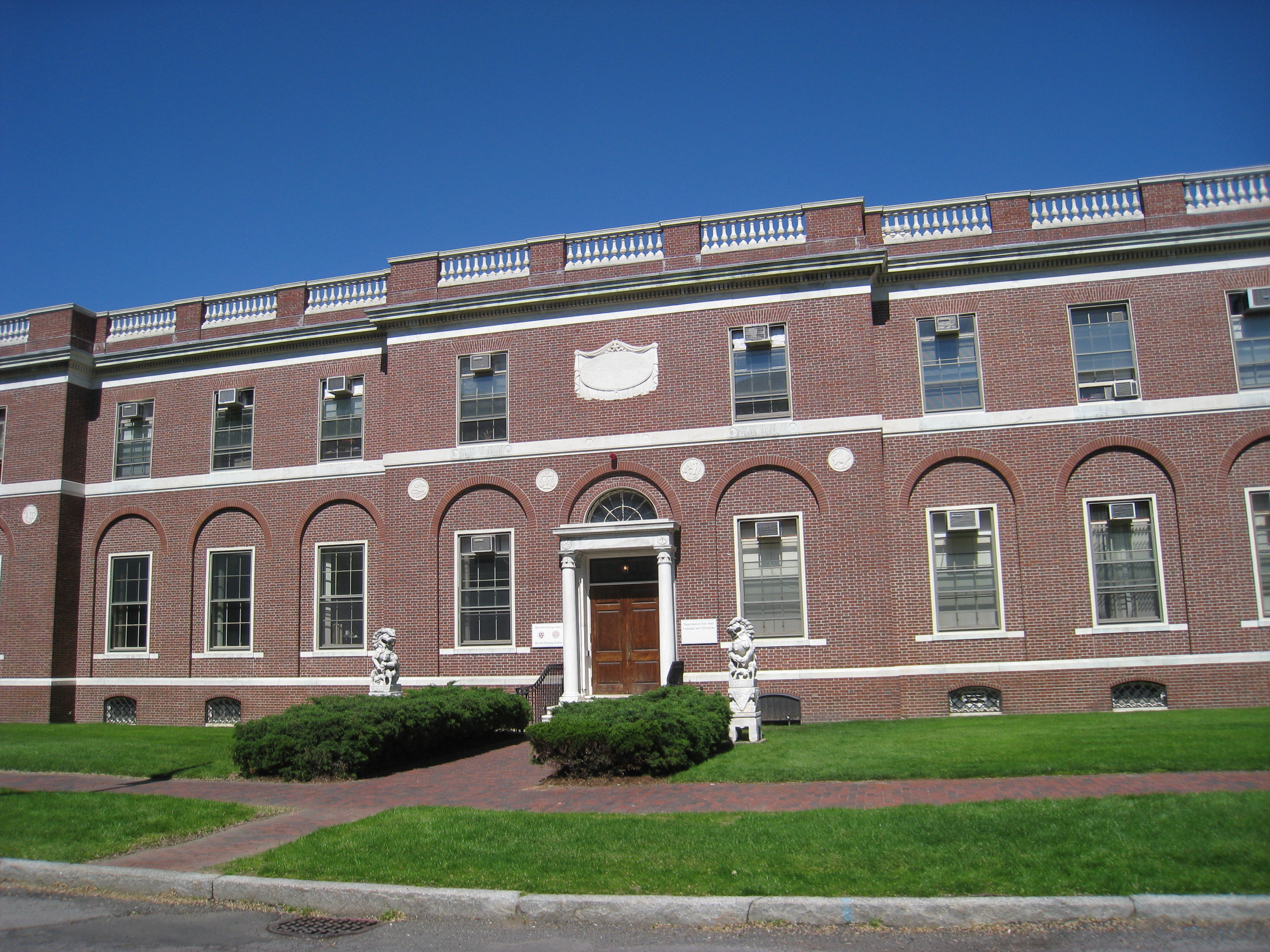
The Harvard-Yenching Institute

The Harvard–Yenching Institute is an independent foundation dedicated to advancing higher education in Asia in the humanities and social sciences, with special attention to the study of Asian culture. It traditionally had close ties to Harvard University and the now-defunct Yenching University, and its offices are located on the Harvard campus in Cambridge, Massachusetts, but it is not part of Harvard.

== History ==
The Harvard–Yenching Institute (HYI) was founded in 1928 by Yenching University President John Leighton Stuart with funding provided solely from the estate of Charles Martin Hall, the inventor of a process for refining aluminum and the founder of the Aluminum Company of America (ALCOA). Although the institute has close ties with Harvard University, it is a legally and fiscally independent public charitable trust. Hall's charge to the trustees of his estate was to promote higher education in Asia, and to that end the trustees of his estate partnered with Harvard University in order to fulfill the Harvard–Yenching Institute's mission as stated in its Articles of Incorporation:

to conduct and provide research, instruction and publication in the culture of China and/or elsewhere in Continental Asia and Japan and/or Turkey and the Balkan States in Europe, by founding, developing, supporting, maintaining and/or conducting one or more educational institutions and/or by supporting in whole or in part, co-operating with or joining or affiliating with other institutions now in existence or hereafter formed...

In the 1930s, the institute supported the development of what became the department of East Asian Languages and Civilizations at Harvard and founded the Harvard-Yenching Library as well as the Harvard Journal of Asiatic Studies. During the 1930s and 40s, the institute provided direct support to Yenching University in Beiping (now Beijing), because of its focus on the humanities, along with five other colleges in China, University of Nanking (Nanjing), Fukien Christian University (Fuzhou), Lingnan University (Guangzhou), Cheeloo University (Jinan) and West China Union University (Chengdu), as well as Allahabad Agricultural Institute in India.

Since the 1950s, the institute's core activity has been to offer fellowships for overseas study and research to younger doctoral and post-doctoral scholars at leading East and Southeast Asian universities in all fields of the humanities and social sciences. Although the institute has a special commitment to promoting the study of Asian culture, its support is not limited to that field. To date over 1000 faculty from Asia have received Institute fellowships and over 300 doctoral students have received their degrees with Institute support. In addition to providing fellowships, the institute supports publications through Harvard's Monograph Series as well as overseas publications in Chinese and Vietnamese, conferences, workshops and training programs.

== Management ==
The Harvard–Yenching Institute has a nine-member board of directors, consisting of three each representing Harvard University and the United Board for Christian Higher Education in Asia, and three independent members with significant experience in Asia. In addition, a HYI Faculty Advisory Committee functions as an informal advisory group to the director, offering general advice on institute operations and academic directions. In its 80 years, the Harvard–Yenching Institute has had seven directors, each a member of the faculty of Harvard University:

== Directors ==
- Serge Elisséeff (1934–1956)
- Edwin O. Reischauer (1956–1964)
- Glen W. Baxter, Acting Director (1961–1964)
- John Pelzel (1964–1975)
- Albert M. Craig (1976–1986)
- Patrick Hanan (1987–1995)
- Tu Wei-ming (1996–2008)
- Elizabeth J. Perry (2008–2024)
- James Robson (2024–present)

== Fellowship programs ==
The Harvard–Yenching Institute has several fellowship programs that bring scholars from Asia to conduct research at Harvard University, to participate in special training programs, or to attend graduate school at Harvard University as well as other universities in the U.S. and abroad. The fellowship programs include:

- Associate Program
- Coordinate Research Program
- NUS-HYI Joint Scholarship
- Regional Studies – East Asia Program
- Training programs
- Visiting Scholars Program
- Visiting Fellows Program
