= Edwin O. Reischauer Memorial House =

Coordinates: 42.391°N 71.175°W

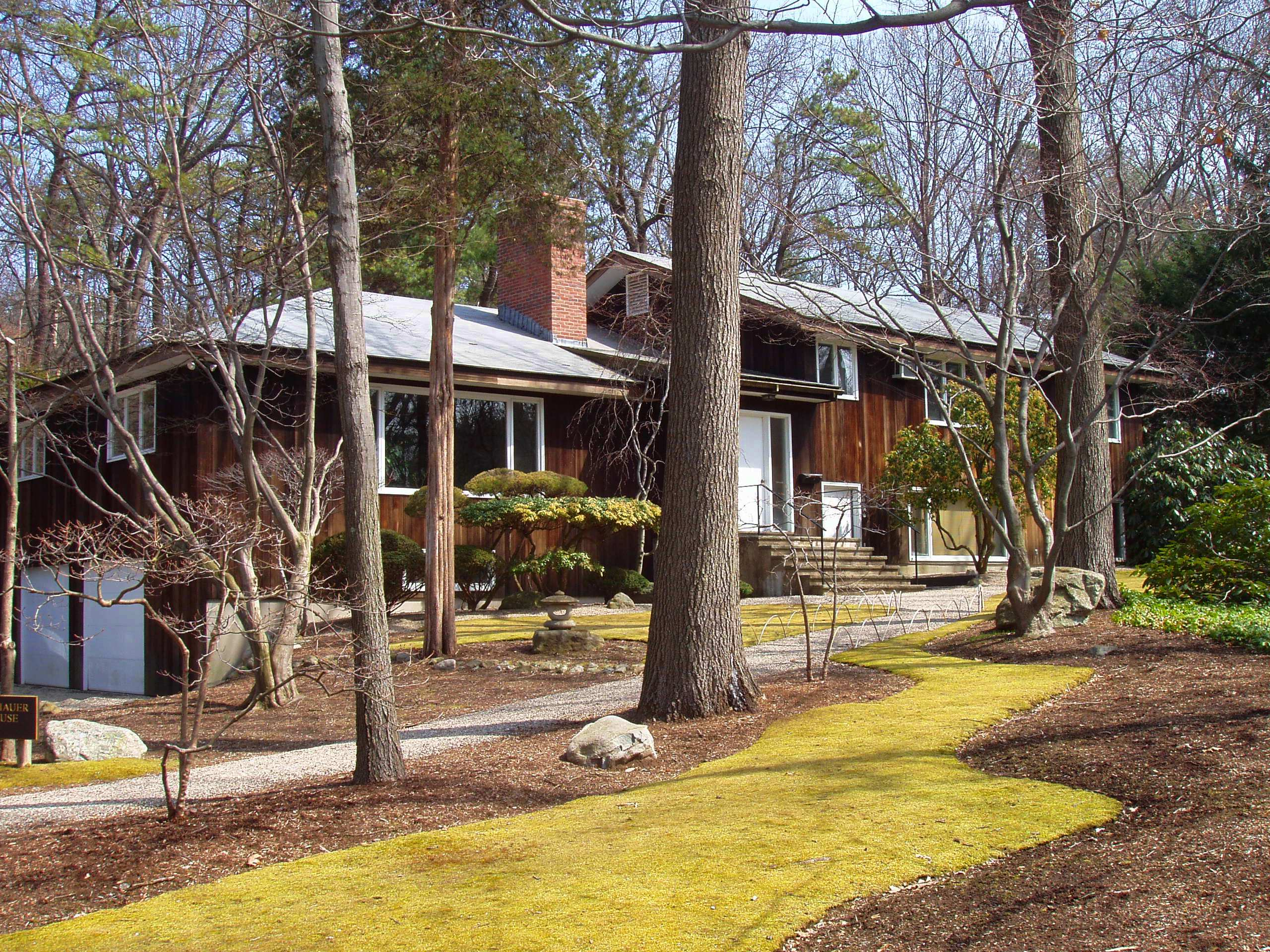
Edwin O. Reischauer Memorial House

The Edwin O. Reischauer Memorial House is the former home of American diplomat and Japanese scholar Edwin O. Reischauer in Belmont, Massachusetts.

After Reischauer's death, the house was purchased by Kodansha Publishers. For many years, it was used for special housing for scholars connected with the Edwin O. Reischauer Institute of Japanese Studies at Harvard University, and also contained memorabilia of the Reischauers' careers, and hosted a yearly memorial symposium. In 2010 the house was sold, and it then since served as a private residence. As of 2025, it has been demolished.
