= Donald Shively =

American japanologist

- Donald Shively
- Born: May 11, 1921; Kyoto, Japan
- Died: August 13, 2005 (aged 84)
- Occupation: Japanologist

Donald Howard Shively (May 11, 1921 – August 13, 2005) was an American academic, historian, Japanologist, author and professor emeritus of East Asian Languages and Cultures at the University of California, Berkeley. He was a leader of Japan studies in the United States.

== Early life ==
Shively was the son of American missionaries in Japan. He was born in Kyoto and educated at the Canadian Academy in Japan.

Years of study in the United States began when he entered Harvard in 1940, but his college years were interrupted by war. In World War II, Shively was a Japanese language officer. He was promoted to the rank of major in the United States Marine Corps, and his service was marked by the Bronze Star Medal. His training during WWII at Camp Ritchie's Military Intelligence Training Center classifies him as one of the Ritchie Boys.

Shively received his bachelor's degree from Harvard University in 1946 (Class of '44). He continued his studies in Cambridge, and he earned a master's degree in 1947. He was awarded a Ph.D. in 1951.

== Career ==
Shively began his teaching career at the University of California, Berkeley. He was at Berkeley from 1950 to 1962. During this period, he edited the Journal of Asian Studies (1955–1959).

From 1962 through 1964, he was a member of the Stanford faculty. He then moved east to return to Harvard as a member of the faculty from 1964 to 1983. He was director of the Edwin O. Reischauer Institute of Japanese Studies from 1981 through 1983, and also editor of the Harvard Journal of Asiatic Studies from 1975 to 1983.

In 1983, Shively returned to teach at Berkeley. He was also the head of the university's East Asian library until he retired in 1992. Dr. Shively died of Shy–Drager syndrome at the age of 84 in Oakland, California.

== Selected works ==
Most notable among his works covering popular culture in the Edo period of Japan is the translation of The Love Suicides at Amijima, a famous kabuki play written by Chikamatsu Monzaemon.

In a statistical overview derived from writings by and about Donald Shively, OCLC/WorldCat encompasses roughly 40+ works in 90+ publications in 3 languages and 3,000+ library holdings.

- The Love Suicide at Amijima: a study of a Japanese Domestic Tragedy by Chikamatsu Monzaemon (1953)
- Personality in Japanese History (1970) with Albert Craig
- Tradition and Modernization in Japanese Culture (1971)
- The Cambridge History of Japan, Vol. 2, Heian Japan (1999)

== Honors ==
- Order of the Rising Sun, 1982.
