= Harold Bolitho =

Australian academic and historian

Harold Bolitho at Monash, 1985

Harold Bolitho (3 January 1939 – 23 October 2010) was an Australian academic, historian, author and professor emeritus in the Department of East Asian Languages and Civilizations at Harvard University. The name Bolitho is of Cornish origin.

== Career ==
Bolitho received his B.A. from the University of Melbourne in 1961 and his M.A., M.Phil, and PhD degrees from Yale. In 1985, Bolitho was granted tenure as a Professor of Japanese History at Harvard. He was Director of the Edwin O. Reischauer Institute of Japanese Studies from 1988 through 1991.

Formerly, Bolitho was a member of the faculty of Monash University and he taught at the University of Melbourne in Victoria, Australia. Bolitho was a visiting professor at the Research Institute for Humanities at the University of Kyoto in 1989; and he has been a visiting lecturer at the University of Pennsylvania and Columbia University.

=== Japanese studies ===
According to Bolitho, the post-war development of Japanese studies in English-speaking countries was characterized by unexpected growth. He helped to foster that expansion.

Bolitho's research interests included Tokugawa institutions, the Bakumatsu and the Meiji Restoration, with an emphasis on regionalism. In his 1969 doctoral dissertation, "The Fudai Daimyo and the Tokogawa Settlement," he refined a distinctive point of view about the fudai daimyo and the bakufu. He argued that it was the collective power of the fudai and their competing interests that prevented the accumulation of unfettered power by the central government. He argued that "historians, believing too readily that the fudai were more bureaucrats than barons, have ... assumed that they were the model servants of centralized feudalism" and that "an examination of their roles supports no such belief".

In addition to his own work, Bolitho worked for Brill Publishers as an editor of their Japanese Studies Library. The series includes monographs on substantial subjects, thematic collections of articles, handbooks, text editions, and translations.

=== Australian studies ===
In commemoration of the United States bicentennial in 1976, the Australian government provided funding for an endowed chair in Australian studies at Harvard. This faculty position rotates yearly among different departments, and former chair holders have come to Harvard from a number of disciplines. This investment in Harvard encouraged an expanded interest in Australian studies. As he was an Australian, it was natural for Bolitho to serve as chair of the Committee on Australian Studies in the Faculty of Arts and Sciences.

== Selected works ==
In a statistical overview derived from writings by and about Harold Bolitho, OCLC/WorldCat encompasses roughly 10+ works in 30+ publications in 3 languages and 1,000+ library holdings

- Treasures Among Men: The Fudai Daimyo in Tokugawa Japan (1974)
- Japanese Kingship (1976)
- Meiji Japan (1977)
- A Northern Prospect: Australian Papers on Japan: Papers from the 1st Conference of Japanese Studies Association of Australia (1981) with Alan Rix
- Two Lectures on Japanese History. (1983)
- Approaching Australia: Papers from the Harvard Australian Studies Symposium. (1999)
- Bereavement and Consolation: Testimonies from Tokugawa Japan (2003)

Chapters

- "The Tempo Crisis," The Nineteenth Century: Cambridge History of Japan, Vol. 5 (1989), Marius Jansen, editor
- Hall, John W.; Brown, Delmer M.; Marius B., Jansen; McCullough, William H.; Shively, Donald Howard; Kanai, Madoka; Yamamura, Kozo; Duus, Peter (1988). The Cambridge History of Japan. Cambridge University Press. ISBN 978-0-521-22355-3.
