= Edwin O. Reischauer Institute of Japanese Studies =

Research center at Harvard University

The Edwin O. Reischauer Institute of Japanese Studies (RIJS) at Harvard University is a research center focusing on Japan. It provides a forum for stimulating scholarly and public interest.

The institute's function is to develop and coordinate activities concerning Japan among the various faculties at Harvard. RIJS responds to scholarly and public interest in Japan from outside Harvard; and RIJS supports outreach activities such as lectures, conferences, symposia, exhibitions and films.

== History ==
In 1973, Edwin Reischauer established the Japan Institute at Harvard. In honor of his 75th birthday in 1985, the Harvard Board of Trustees renamed it The Edwin O. Reischauer Institute of Japanese Studies, to honor Reischauer's contributions to the institute.

== Directors ==
The RIJS Directors are selected from its senior faculty. Through 2019, there have been eleven Institute Directors serving 13 intervals:

- Edwin Reischauer, 1974-1981
- Donald Shively, 1981-1983
- Albert M. Craig, 1983-1985
- Howard Hibbett, 1985-1988
- Harold Bolitho, 1988-1991
- Akira Iriye, 1991-1995
- Helen Hardacre, 1995-1998
- Andrew Gordon, 1998–2004; 2011-2012
- Susan Pharr, 2002–2003; 2004-2011
- Theodore C. Bestor, 2012–2018
- Mary C. Brinton, 2018–present

== Selected works ==
RIJS's published list of occasional papers on Japanese Studies encompasses 51 works in 83 publications in 1 language and 410 library holdings.

- Multiple Logics of the Welfare State: Skills, Protection, and Female Labor in Japan and Selected OECD countries (1999) by Margarita Estévez-Abe
- Cost Reduction in Transmission and Distribution: a Key Issue for Liberalization of the Power Market (1999) by Shinya Nishigata
- Compliance from Within : MITI's Transition and Japan's Changing GATT Behavior (1999) by Amy Searight
- The Social Responsibility of Corporations (1999) by Masatoshi Taguchi
- Japan's Future Employment System: Recommendations Based on a Study of the Japanese and U.S. Labor Markets (2000) by Koki Hayakawa
- Exploration of Management Methods for Sustainable Development in Regional Governments (2000) by Nobuo Ino
- Style Differences at International Negotiations: a Comparison between Japan and the United States: Case Study of the International Negotiations on Global Climate Change (2000) by Takashi Kageyama
- Toward a More Desirable System of Foreign Exchange Management in Asia: Possible Roles for Japan and the United States (2000) by Yasuhiro Maki
- Reflections on Modern Japanese History in the Context of the Concept of "Genocide" (2001) by Gavan McCormack
- Policy Legacies: Japan's Responses to Domestic and International Environmental Problems (2000) by Isao Miyaoka
- Foreign Direct Investment Strategies of Japanese High-technology Firms in East Asia (2000) by Patricia A Nelson
- The Evolution of Japan's Politico-security Role in the Asia-Pacific Region: an Insider's View (2000) by Seiichiro Otsuka
- Respect for the Elderly's Votes: Theories of Interests and the Elderly in Japanese Healthcare Policy, 1995-2000 (2000) by Paul David Talcott
- Management of Internet Domain Names (2000) by Hidekazu Tanaka
- Rediscovering Women in Tokugawa Japan (2000) by Yutaka Yabuta
- From Feudal Fishing Villagers to an Archipelago's Peoples: the Historiographical Journey of Amino Yoshihiko (2005) by William Johnston

== See also ==
- Edwin O. Reischauer Lectures, Harvard
- Edwin O. Reischauer Center for East Asian Studies, Johns Hopkins
