= Ennin's Diary =

9th-century diary of Japanese monk in China

The Record of a Pilgrimage to China in Search of the Dharma
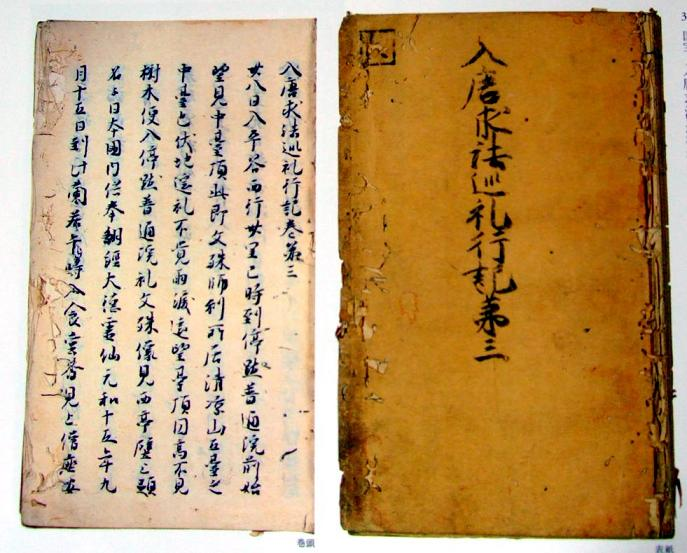
- Cover and page of The Record of a Pilgrimage to China in Search of the Law. Version unknown.
- Author: Ennin (AD 793 or 794 – 864)
- Original title: 入唐求法巡禮行記
- Language: Classical Chinese

Ennin's Diary

Chinese name
- Traditional Chinese: 入唐求法巡禮行記
Transcriptions
Standard Mandarin
- Hanyu Pinyin: Rù Táng qiúfǎ xúnlǐ xíngjì
Middle Chinese
- Middle Chinese: Nyip-Dang gjuw-pjop zwin-léi hæng-kì

Japanese name
- Kanji: 入唐求法巡禮行記
- Kana: にっとうぐほうじゅんれいこうき
Transcriptions
- Romanization: Nittō guhō junrei kōki

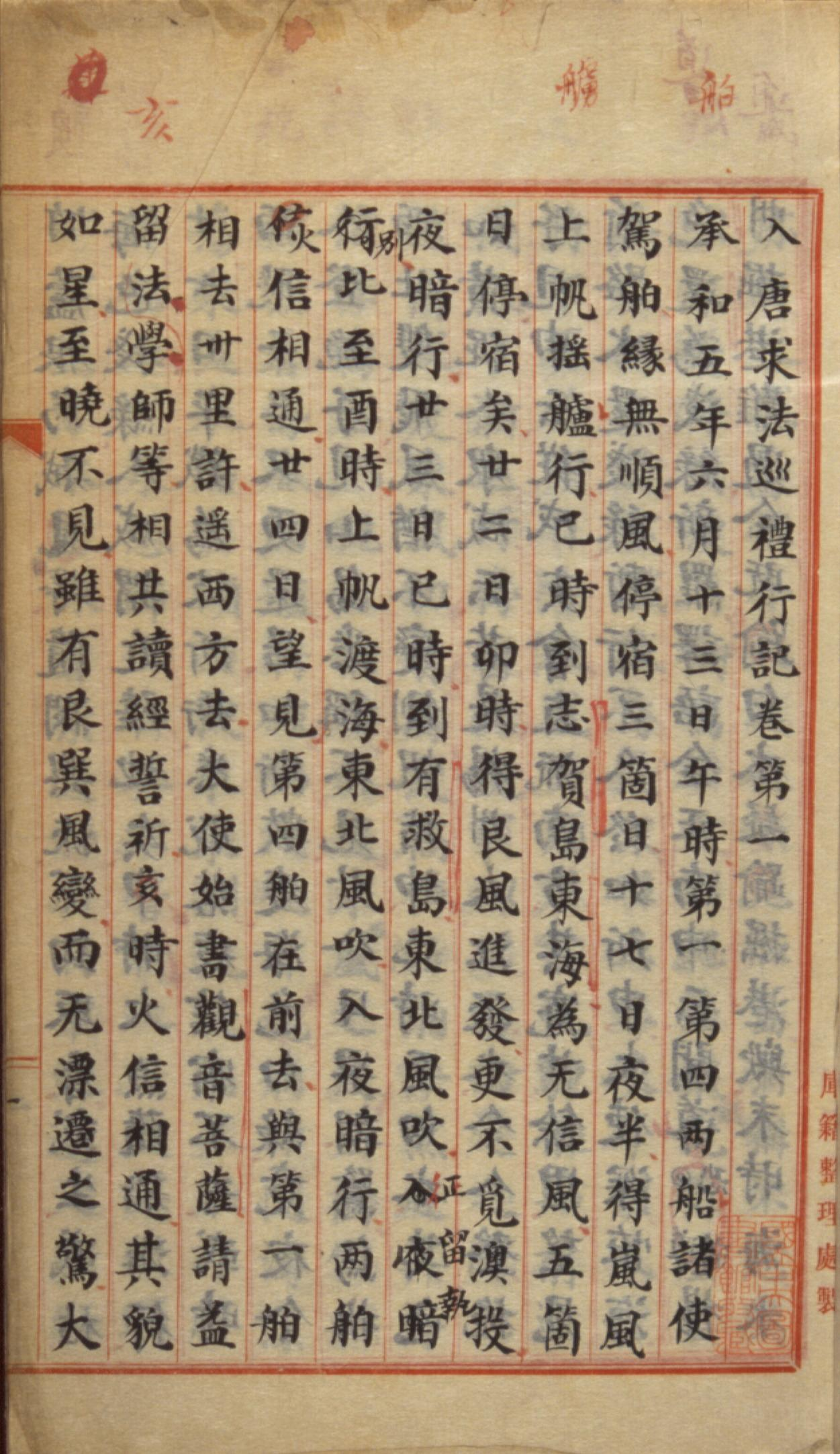
Page of The Record of a Pilgrimage to China in Search of the Law, of the version kept by Taiwan's National Central Library

The Record of a Pilgrimage to China in Search of the Dharma (入唐求法巡禮行記, nittō guhō junreikōki) is a four-volume diary written by Ennin, a Japanese Buddhist monk in China during the ninth century. He was one of eight Japanese Buddhists who studied in China at that time. He wrote his diary while he went on a Buddhist pilgrimage to China for nine and a half years (838–847). The books are translated into English as two volumes by Professor Edwin O. Reischauer of Harvard University under the title Ennin's Diary: The Record of a Pilgrimage to China in Search of the Law (Ronald Press, New York: 1955) and Ennin's Travels in T'ang China. The first volume is a translation of Ennin's Diary. The second volume, a discussion of Ennin's travels, includes materials from other sources.

Ennin's travel books are precious as historical sources, although they have some errors. His book was the first written document about China and its life by a foreigner. He did not write an evaluation of what he saw, but rather wrote about religious matters and Chinese life under the Tang dynasty. His diary is a good source on the practice of popular Buddhism in China. He described ceremonies as well. He brought back many sutras and mandalas to Japan. He struggled in his travel during the Tang's persecution of Buddhism (842–846).

Another contribution on his books was about Korea, which records details of Korea's active trade with Northeastern China. Korea had a dominant role in trade between East China, Korea, and Japan.
