= Susan Pharr =

Susan J. Pharr (born March 16, 1944) is an academic in political science, a Japanologist, Edwin O. Reischauer Professor of Japanese Politics, director of the Reischauer Institute of Japanese Studies, and involved in the program on U.S.-Japan Relations at Harvard University. Her current research focuses on the changing nature of relations between citizens and states in Asia and on the forces that shape civil society over time.

In the spring of 2008, the Japanese government acknowledged Pharr's life's work by conferring the Order of the Rising Sun, Gold Rays with Neck Ribbon, which represents the third highest of eight classes associated with this award. Accompanying the badge of the order was a certificate explaining the award as recognition of the extent to which Pharr has "contributed to promoting intellectual exchange between Japan and the United States of America, and to guiding and nurturing young Japanologists."

== Education and academic life ==
Susan Pharr received her B.A. (1966) with high honors from Emory University. In 1966–67, she was a Woodrow Wilson Fellow. She earned her M.A. (1970) and Ph.D. (1975) in political science from Columbia University, where she specialized in comparative politics with a focus on Japan.

Her interest in Japan was largely a matter of happenstance. As a first-year graduate student looking for recreation and a few self-defense skills for the streets of New York City, she signed up for a judo class that turned out to be made up almost entirely of Japanese black belts who were fellow Columbia students. Talking with her judo classmates and venturing in their company for sushi piqued her interest sufficiently to spur her to take courses on Japanese society and politics with James William Morley, Herbert Passin, and, later on, Gerald Curtis. In an intellectual world that was galvanized by the question of what made countries succeed or fail politically and economically, she found the study of Meiji Japan riveting and soon made Japan the center of her doctoral work in comparative politics.

While completing her dissertation, she launched her career at the Social Science Research Council in New York, where from 1974 to 1976 she served as staff associate for its Japan Committee, a post later held, coincidentally, by her Reischauer Institute colleague Theodore C. Bestor.

In 1977 she became an assistant professor at the University of Wisconsin–Madison and was promoted to associate professor in 1980. On leave from Wisconsin, she spent a year in the Agency for International Development, where she was assigned responsibility for improving U.S.-Japan aid coordination in 1983. Two years later between 1985 and 1987, she served as Japan Chair at the Center for Strategic and International Studies (CSIS) in Washington, D.C.

Pharr joined the Harvard faculty in 1987. She has served as director of Harvard's Program on U.S.-Japan Relations since 1987 and became Edwin O. Reischauer Professor of Japanese Politics in 1991. From 1992 to 1995 she served as chair of the Government Department. In 1995–96, she held the Edwin O. Reischauer Professor of Japanese Studies. In 1996–98, she was as associate dean of the Faculty of Arts and Sciences. She has been the director of the Edwin O. Reischauer Institute of Japanese Studies since 2004 through the present.

As an active participant in university life at Harvard, Pharr is on the steering committee of the Asia Center and on the executive committee of the Weatherhead Center for International Affairs. She serves on the faculty advisory committee for the Hauser Center for Nonprofit Organizations, and is a member of the University Committee on the Environment and the University Committee on the Status of Women. She is also a senior scholar of the Harvard Academy of International and Area Studies.

The impact of any one faculty member is hard to measure in a large multi-faceted institution like Harvard; and yet her name does crop up in a range of contexts. For example, when students proposed creating a student-run magazine about Japan, Pharr agreed to be a faculty advisor. As one of only 41 female tenured professors in the early 1990s, she acknowledged that "in many ways Harvard is very much a male institution," which makes her role in the university's Committee on Women all the more significant.

Pharr is a member of the Council on Foreign Relations and has been a fellow or visiting research scholar at the Brookings Institution, the Woodrow Wilson International Center for Scholars, the East West Center, University of Tokyo, Sophia University and Keio University.

=== Honors ===
- Order of the Rising Sun, Gold Rays with Neck Ribbon, 2008.

=== Fellowships and grants ===
- 1986-87—Principal Investigator for grants from the Ford Foundation, Rockefeller Brothers Foundation, U.S. Agency for International Development and Japan-U.S. Friendship Commission for international project on "Japan and the U.S. in Third World Development."
- 1986-88—Principal Investigator, grant from the Japan-U.S. Friendship Commission through the Social Science Research Council for bi-national project on "Media and Politics in Japan in Comparative Perspective."
- 1990-96—Principal Investigator for grant to the Harvard Program on U.S.-Japan Relations from Akiyama Aiseikan Corporation for research on "Japan and the Third World."
- 1994-97—Grant from the V. Kann Rasmussen Foundation for project on "Yen for the Earth: Japan's China Environment Initiative."
- 1995-97—Co-principal investigator for grant from the Mellon Foundation on "The Performance of Democracies."
- 1996—Fellow of the Abe Fellowship Program, Social Science Research Council, for project on "Political Ethics and Public Trust in Japan, Italy, and the United States."
- 1996-98—Co-principal investigator for grant from the National Science Foundation for a binational Japan-U.S. project on "Japan's Political Reform: Electoral Institution Change and Political Culture."
- 1996-99—Member, steering committee, for project on "Social Capital, Democracy, and Public Affairs," administered by the American Academy of Arts and Sciences and funded by grants from the Ford Foundation, Rockefeller Foundation, and the Carnegie Foundation.
- 1997-98—Invitee to the Rockefeller Study Center, Bellagio, Italy, as co-organizer (with Robert D. Putnam) of a conference, June 29-July 3, 1998, on "Public Trust and Governance in the Trilateral Democracies."
- 1999 -- (Summer) Posco Fellow, Research Program, East-West Center.
- 2000-02—Principal investigator, Grants from the U.S.-Japan Friendship Commission and the Center for Global Partnership for a project on "Civil Society in Japan," the first stage of a three-year project joint with the East-West Center, and in cooperation with Keio University, on "Civil Society in the Asia-Pacific."

== Selected works ==
Much of Pharr's research has explored the social basis for democracy in Japan. Her research interests include comparative political behavior; comparative politics of industrialized nations; democratization and political development in Japan and Asia; civil society and nonprofit organizations; political ethics and corruption; environmental politics; the role of the media in politics; U.S.-Japan relations; Japanese politics; and international relations in East Asia.

In a statistical overview derived from writings by and about Susan Pharr, OCLC/WorldCat encompasses roughly 10+ works in 50+ publications in 4 languages and 3,000+ library holdings.

- Political Women in Japan (1981)
  - Nihon no josei katsudo-ka (1989)
- Losing Face: Status Politics in Japan (1990)
- Media and Politics in Japan (1996), with Ellis S. Krauss
- Disaffected Democracies: What's Troubling Democracies? (2000), with Robert D. Putnam
- The State of Civil Society in Japan (2003), with Frank J. Schwartz

== See also ==
- Tonarigumi
