= Harvard Journal of Asiatic Studies =

- Discipline: East Asian studies
- Language: English
- Edited by: David L. Howell; Melissa J. Brown; Chun-Yi Sum

Publication details
- History: 1936–present
- Publisher: Harvard-Yenching Institute (Beijing)

Standard abbreviations
- ISO 4: Harv. J. Asiat. Stud.

Indexing
- ISSN: 0073-0548

Links
- Journal homepage

The Harvard Journal of Asiatic Studies (HJAS) is an English-language scholarly journal published by the Harvard-Yenching Institute. HJAS features articles and book reviews of current scholarship in East Asian Studies, focusing on Chinese, Japanese, and Korean history, literature and religion, with occasional coverage of politics and linguistics. It has been called "Americas's leading sinological journal."

== History ==
The Harvard Journal of Asiatic Studies was founded in 1936 by the Russian-French scholar Serge Elisséeff under the auspices of the Harvard-Yenching Institute, an independent, non-profit organization founded in 1928 to further the spread of knowledge and scholarship on East and Southeast Asia. Elisséeff's wide range of knowledge came to be reflected in the diverse character of the journal during the twenty-one years he served as its editor (1936–1957).

Since the days of Elisséeff, the journal has been guided by:

- John Bishop (editor), 1958–1974
- Timothy Connor, 1975
- Donald Shively, 1976–1983
- Ronald Egan, 1983–1987
- Howard Hibbett, 1988–
- Joanna Handlin Smith, present-

=== Publishing History ===
The journal was published three times yearly from its inception until 1947. From 1948 until 1957 it was released biannually, but from 1958 to 1976 the journal was released only annually or in two-year periods. Since 1977 it has been published twice yearly in June and December.

== Notes ==
=== References ===
- Fan, Shuhua (2014). The Harvard-Yenching Institute and Cultural Engineering : Remaking the Humanities in China, 1924-1951. Lanham, Maryland: Lexington Books. ISBN 9780739168509.
- "Japanese Bibliography, English-Language Journals". Columbia University. 2003.
- Zurndorfer, Harriet (1995). China Bibliography: A Research Guide to Reference Works About China Past and Present. Leiden; New York: E.J. Brill. ISBN 9004102787.
