= Serge Elisséeff =

Russian-French Japanologist (1889–1975)

- Born: 13 January 1889; St. Petersburg, Russian Empire
- Died: 13 April 1975 (aged 86); Paris, France
- Citizenship: French (from 1931)
- Education: University of Berlin; Tokyo Imperial University
- Scientific career
- Fields: Japanese studies
- Workplaces: Petrograd Imperial University; École pratique des hautes études La Sorbonne; Harvard University
- Doctoral students: Edwin O. Reischauer
- Other notable students: James Robert Hightower

Chinese name
- Traditional Chinese: 葉理綏
- Simplified Chinese: 叶理绥
Transcriptions
Standard Mandarin
- Hanyu Pinyin: Yè Lǐsuī
- Gwoyeu Romatzyh: Yeh Liisuei
- Wade–Giles: Yeh^{4} Li^{3}-sui^{1}

Japanese name
- Kanji: 英利世夫
Transcriptions
- Romanization: Eiriseifu

Serge Elisséeff (French pronunciation: [sɛʁʒ əliseɛf]; born Sergei Grigorievich Eliseyev; 13 January 1889 – 13 April 1975) was a Russian-French scholar, Japanologist, and professor at Harvard University. He was one of the first Westerners to study Japanese at a university in Japan. He began studying Japanese at the University of Berlin, then transferred to Tokyo Imperial University in 1912, becoming the first Westerner to graduate from there in Japanese and was its first Western graduate student.

Elisséeff served in 1916 as Privat-Dozent at Petrograd Imperial University (modern Saint Petersburg State University), and in 1917 as Professor in the Institute for the History of Foreign Affairs in Petrograd. In the 1930s he became a professor of Far Eastern Languages at Harvard, where he became the first director of the Harvard-Yenching Institute and founded the Harvard Journal of Asiatic Studies.

Fluent in eight languages, including Chinese and Japanese, Elisséeff was one of the foremost Japanologists of his time, both in the West and in Japan. The American Japanologist Edwin O. Reischauer, who was one of Elisséeff's students, wrote that "perhaps no one better deserves the title of Father of Far Eastern Studies in the United States." He had close personal ties to many of the greatest Japanese literary names of the early 20th century and wrote occasional articles for the Asahi Shimbun.

== Life and career ==
=== Early life ===
Serge Elisséeff was born "Sergei Grigorievich Eliseyev" (Russian: Сергей Григорьевич Елисеев) on 13 January 1889 in St. Petersburg. Elisséeff's great-grandfather Pyotr Eliseyev (1775–1825) was born a serf in bondage to the Sheremetev family but started a wine and fruit import business that with subsequent generations became a large economic empire including the St. Petersburg Private Commercial Bank (first joint-stock bank in the Russian Empire), the Russian Bank for Foreign Trade and the Russian Lloyd's insurance company among others. Elisséeff's father, Grigori Eliseyev (1858–1949), inherited the family business, and was one of the builders of the Eliseyev Emporium in St. Petersburg.

Due to the great wealth of Elisséeff's family, his parents spared no expense in educating him and his brothers. When Elisséeff was six years old, he began regular lessons in German with his mother's private secretary. His parents also had a custom of only speaking French at their dinner table in order to prevent their butlers and servants from eavesdropping on their conversations, a practice that was augmented by the boys' French private tutor. In 1899, at age 10, Elisséeff began attending Larinsky College, a gymnasium in St. Petersburg, where he received a traditional education in the Latin and Greek Classics. When he was 11, his parents added private English tutoring to his education, so that by his teenage years Elisséeff was already fluent in French, German, English, Latin, and Ancient Greek, in addition to his native Russian.

As a youth, Elisséeff initially desired to pursue a career in oil painting, but was convinced by his Russian literature teacher that his wealthy background would prevent him from "knowing the suffering that any creative art requires", and that he should become a scholar of the humanities instead. His teacher arranged for Elisséeff to meet with Sergey Oldenburg, the secretary of the Russian Academy of Sciences and Russia's preeminent scholar of East Asia. Elisséeff told Oldenburg that he wanted to begin studying Chinese, but Oldenburg advised him to focus on Japanese instead, as there were already a number of well-trained Sinologists in Europe at that time but only one expert Japanologist – the British scholar Basil Hall Chamberlain. Oldenburg advised Elisséeff to enter the University of Berlin (modern Humboldt University of Berlin) and begin studying Japanese and Chinese, and then to move to Japan for further study.

=== University study ===
Elisséeff began his university studies at the University of Berlin in 1907, at age 18, in the Seminar für Orientalischen Sprachen (Seminar for Oriental Languages) led by German scholar Eduard Sachau. He studied Japanese language and history, and also began studying Chinese under German sinologists Wilhelm Grube and Otto Franke.

In 1908, after one year at Berlin, Elisséeff transferred to Tokyo Imperial University (modern University of Tokyo), where, after some initial opposition, he became its first foreign student who had not come up through the Japanese "higher school" (kōtō gakkō 高等学校) system. In addition to his normal courses, Elisséeff also took a heavy load of private tutoring to make up for his limited background in Japanese. He graduated in 1912, scoring an 82 (equivalent to modern "A−") on his final oral examination and writing a thesis on the haiku of the famed Japanese poet Bashō entitled "Bashō kenkyū no ippen 芭蕉研究の一片" ("An Aspect of Bashō Studies"), and graduated near the top of his class. Elisséeff was allowed to stand with in the row of "A" students at their graduation ceremony, which was also the last public function attended by Emperor Meiji.

Notwithstanding his excellent academic performance, Elisséeff was still racially discriminated against as a foreigner. On the official list of 1912 graduates, Elisséeff's name was printed at the very bottom of the paper, separated from the rest of the students by a wide space, which implied that he graduated last in his class when he had actually been one of the top students. When Elisséeff confronted Haga Yaichi (芳賀失一; 1867–1927), the professor responsible for his low placement on the notice, Haga "simply explained to him that it was impossible to list a foreigner higher than any Japanese." Elisséeff had to make a special request to receive an invitation to join the Alumni Society (Bungakushikai 文学士会) – normally automatically extended to all graduates – and his invitations to their meetings were commonly delivered the day after they had taken place, with the explanation that "the presence of a foreigner at these meetings would inhibit the discussion."

In autumn 1912, Elisséeff returned to Tokyo Imperial as its first ever foreign graduate student. He studied Chinese and Japanese painting, Japanese history, and the drama of the late medieval Japanese poet Ihara Saikaku. Elisséeff was also interested in Kabuki theatre, and took private Kabuki dancing lessons in his spare time. In addition to Japanese, also began taking private lessons in Mandarin Chinese from a Manchu tutor to improve his knowledge of Chinese. In early 1913, Elisséeff met and interviewed Keiki, the last shōgun of the Tokugawa shogunate. Elisséeff's academic accomplishments as a foreigner made him "a kind of legend" in Japan and Japanese scholarship, and earned him connections with notable Japanese literary figures such as the renowned novelist Natsume Sōseki and author Kafū Nagai.

=== University of St. Petersburg ===
While a graduate student at Tokyo, Elisséeff met the German economist Heinrich Waentig, who read some of Elisséeff's scholarship and noted that while his linguistic and historical knowledge had become strong, his organizational and analytic skills were not up to Western standards, and advised him to return to Europe. He left Japan in the summer of 1914 and returned to St. Petersburg, where he presented himself as a Ph.D. candidate at the University of St. Petersburg. Elisséeff had to get governmental approval to have his University of Tokyo degree recognized as equivalent to those from European universities, and his acceptance as a Ph.D. candidate had to be personally approved by Tsar Nicholas II.

Elisséeff was then appointed a privat-dozent in Japanese and an official interpreter for the Russian Ministry of Foreign Affairs. He was also elected an assistant professor at the private Institute of Art History, where he gave a course on the history of Chinese art that has been recognized as probably the first Chinese art history course in the West to be based primarily on original Chinese and Japanese texts and sources. He spent the next two summers in Japan working on a Ph.D. dissertation on Bashō, but was devastated upon returning to Russia in the fall of 1917: the chaos of the Bolshevik Revolution had allowed the Bolsheviks to take over the banking system, in which the Elisséeff's family fortune was seized, and the manuscript of his nearly completed dissertation was confiscated from the diplomatic pouch in which he had mailed it home and burned.

=== Harvard and later career ===
Elisséeff spent the years from 1917 to 1920 in St. Petersburg attempting to continue his work, but his family was frequently harassed and searched because of their affluent background, and Elisséeff was constantly pressured to make his teaching conform to Marxist ideology. Several of his relatives starved to death, and Elisséeff's family survived the winters by burning their furniture collections for warmth. In the summer of 1920, Elisséeff and his wife decided to flee Russia. They hid themselves and their two small sons, all malnourished and weakened, under the deck boards of a fishing boat that smuggled them across the Gulf of Finland to freedom in Finland. They stayed in Finland for a month, then moved to Stockholm for several months before, like many other White Russian émigrés, settling in Paris.

From 1921 to 1929, Elisséeff was also the head interpreter at the Japanese Imperial Embassy in Paris, and formally obtained French citizenship in 1931.

In 1932, Elisséeff came to the United States to serve as a lecturer in Japanese and Chinese at Harvard University. During the 1933–34 academic year, he returned to Paris to serve as Director of Studies at the École Pratique des Hautes Études. He returned to the United States in 1934 when Harvard offered him a professorship in Far Eastern Languages. Elisséeff was the first director of the Harvard–Yenching Institute (HYI), an independent, non-profit organization founded in 1928 to further the spread of knowledge and scholarship on East and Southeast Asia. Under the auspices of the HYI, Elisséeff established the Harvard Journal of Asiatic Studies in 1936. The journal publishes monograph-length scholarly articles focused on Asian humanities. His wide range of knowledge came to be reflected in the diverse character of the journal during the twenty-one years he served as its editor (1936–57). At some point in this tenure, he compared the effects of McCarthyism at Harvard to his experiences in Russia.

Elisséeff resigned his position of director of the Harvard-Yenching Institute in 1956, then the following year accepted emeritus status from Harvard and returned to Paris to his professorship at the École Pratique des Hautes Études, then later retired. The prominent American Japanologist Edwin O. Reischauer, who was one of Elisséeff's students, wrote that "perhaps no one better deserves the title of Father of Far Eastern Studies in the United States." In 1973, Elisséeff became the first foreigner to receive the Japan Foundation Award. His wife, Vera, died in 1971, and Elisséeff himself died in Paris in 1975, aged 86.

== Personal life ==
Elisséeff and his wife, Vera Petrovna (née Eikhe) Elisséeff, were married in Russia on 22 November 1914 and had two sons: Nikita Elisséeff (1 August 1915 –25 November 1997), who became a scholar of the Middle East, and Vadime Elisséeff (4 May 1918 –29 January 2002), a noted historian and expert on East Asian art.

== Honors ==
- Japan Foundation: Japan Foundation Award, 1973.

== Selected works ==
In a statistical overview derived from writings by and about Serge Elisséeff, OCLC/WorldCat encompasses roughly 100+ works in 100+ publications in 10 languages and 1,500+ library holdings.

- La peinture contemporaine au Japon (1923)
- Neuf nouvelles japonaises (1924)
- Le théatre Japonais (kabuki) (1932), with Alexandre Iacovleff
- Elementary Japanese for university students (1941)
- Elementary Japanese for college students (1944)
- Selected Japanese texts for university students (1944)
- Japan : frühe buddhistische Malereien (1959)
