= Arisawa =

Arisawa (written: 有澤 or 有沢) is a Japanese surname. Notable people with the surname include:

- Mamizu Arisawa (有沢 まみず, born 1976), Japanese writer
- Takanori Arisawa (有澤 孝紀, 1951–2005), Japanese composer and arranger

Fictional characters:

- Tatsuki Arisawa (有沢 竜貴), character in the manga series Bleach
