= Albert M. Craig =

American historian (1927–2021)

Albert Morton Craig (December 9, 1927 – December 1, 2021) was an American academic, historian, author and professor emeritus in the Department of History at Harvard University.

== Early life ==
As a youth in Chicago, Craig was an Eagle Scout, and also participated in both competitive swimming and judo. A more scholarly interest in Japan was piqued after the Second World War. While doing counterintelligence work for the United States Army in 1946 and 1947, he was stationed in Miyazaki and in Kyoto. While in Kyoto, he earned a third degree black belt in judo.

Craig earned an undergraduate degree in philosophy in 1949 at Northwestern University, where he was member of Phi Beta Kappa. While there, he set an NCAA freshman record in the 200 yard breaststroke. After college, the Fulbright Program made it possible for him to study economic history at the University of Strasbourg in Strasbourg, France. This was followed by two years (1951–53) as a graduate student at Kyoto University from 1951 through 1953.

He did his doctoral dissertation at Harvard University under the supervision of Edwin O. Reischauer and also worked with John K. Fairbank. Harvard awarded Craig his Ph.D. in history in 1959.

== Career ==
Professor Craig became a member of Harvard's faculty in 1959 and then taught there for forty years, during which he was also a visiting professor at the University of Tokyo, the University of Kyoto, and Keio University.

He became the Harvard-Yenching Research Professor of Japanese History. In addition, he served as Director of the Reischauer Institute (1983–1985) and as Director of the Harvard-Yenching Institute (1976–1987).

His research focused primarily on the transition from the Edo period through the Meiji period.

== Selected works ==
In a statistical overview derived from writings by and about Albert Craig, OCLC/WorldCat encompasses roughly 60+ works in 200+ publications in 7 languages and 8,000+ library holdings.

- Chōshū in the Meiji Restoration (1961)
- Personality in Japanese History (1971), with Donald Shively
- The Heritage of Japanese Civilization (2003)
- The Heritage of Chinese Civilization (2001)
- The Heritage of World Civilizations (2005)
- Civilization and Enlightenment: The Early Thought of Fukuzawa Yukichi (2009)

== Honors ==
- Guggenheim Fellowship
- Fulbright Fellowship
- Japan Foundation Fellowship
- Order of the Rising Sun, 1988
- At ages 80 and 85, Craig set world masters records for those age groups in the 200 meter breaststroke.
