= Haru M. Reischauer =

Japanese-American writer

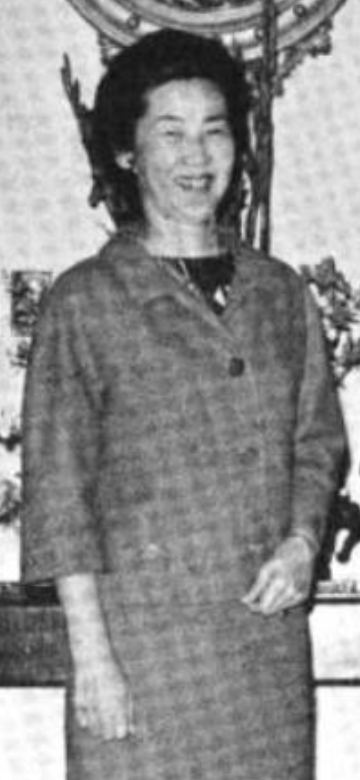
- Haru M. Reischauer, from a 1962 publication of the U.S. State Department
- Born: 1915; Tokyo, Japan
- Died: Sept. 23, 1998 (age 83); La Jolla, California
- Occupation(s): Writer, journalist
- Notable work: Samurai and Silk: A Japanese and American Heritage (1986)
- Spouse: Edwin O. Reischauer
- Relatives: Matsukata Masayoshi (grandfather), Ryoichiro Arai (grandfather), Kōjirō Matsukata (uncle), Miye Matsukata (sister), Tané Matsukata (sister)

Haru Matsukata Reischauer (ハル・松方・ライシャワー, Haru Matsukata Raishawā; 1915–1998) was a Japanese-American writer and wife of the U.S. scholar and Ambassador to Japan Edwin O. Reischauer.

== Early life and education ==
Haru Matsukata was born in Tokyo. She was a granddaughter of Matsukata Masayoshi, a prime minister in the Meiji era known for his liberal policies over financial affairs, and silk importer and exporter Ryoichiro Arai. She was also a niece of the successful industrialist and art collector Kōjirō Matsukata. She was a sister of Tané Matsukata, founder of the Matsukata Academy, later renamed the Nishimachi International School, in Tokyo. Her second cousin was Nobuhiko Ushiba, who served as Japanese Ambassador to the United States from 1970 to 1973. Her sisters were jewelry designer Miye Matsukata, educator Tane Matsukata, Mari Bruck, Naka Rawsthorne, and brother Mako Matsukata.

She attended highschool at the American School in Japan, and in 1937 graduated from Principia College in Illinois.

== Career ==
Matsukata returned to Japan and was there during World War II, but felt out of place because of her experience in America. She later returned to the US and worked as a journalist, where she met Edwin O. Reischauer, whom she married in 1956. In 1961, she returned to Japan with her husband when he was appointed US Ambassador to Japan. They lived in Japan until 1966, a period during which she was able to contribute to the reinforcement of US and Japan relations.

Back to the United States, she took an active role as a director of the Japan America Student Conference.

She wrote an autobiography, Samurai and Silk (1986) which is centered of her grandfathers and their successful roles during Japan's Meiji period. The book inspired a PBS American Playhouse docudrama, Long Shadows.
