= Helen Hardacre =

American Japanologist

Helen Hardacre (born May 20, 1949) is an American Japanologist. She was the Reischauer Institute Professor of Japanese Religions and Society at the Department of East Asian Languages and Civilization, Harvard University. She currently is a Havard Emeritus Professor in the East Asian Languages and Civilizations Department.

== Biography ==
Hardacre was born on May 20, 1949, in Nashville, Tennessee, United States, daughter of Paul Hoswell Hardacre, a historian of Stuart England at Vanderbilt University, and Gracia Louise (Manspeaker) Hardacre. She received her Bachelor of Arts (1971) and Master of Arts (1972) at Vanderbilt University, and completed her PhD at University of Chicago, studying under Joseph Kitagawa.

In 1980, she began her academic career at Princeton University's Department of Religion and taught there until 1989. She then spent two years at the School of Modern Asian Studies, Griffith University, Australia, and subsequently moved to Harvard in 1992. She is currently the Reischauer Institute Professor of Japanese Religions and Society at the Departement of East Asian Languages and Civilization, Harvard University.

She was Director of the Edwin O. Reischauer Institute of Japanese Studies from 1995 through 1998. Her interests include Japanese society and religion and the ramifications of potential constitutional amendments on the future of religion in Japan.

She, like her father, a Los Angeles-born historian of Britain, would be awarded a Guggenheim fellowship (2003). In 2014, she was elected to the American Academy of Arts and Sciences. In 2018, she was awarded the Order of the Rising Sun 3rd Class Gold Rays with Neck Ribbon from the Government of Japan.

== Selected works ==
In a statistical overview derived from writings by and about Helen Hardacre, OCLC/WorldCat encompasses roughly 30+ works in 80+ publications in 3 languages and 5,000+ library holdings

- Lay Buddhism in Contemporary Japan : Reiyūkai Kyōdan (1983)
- The Religion of Japan's Korean Minority : the Preservation of Ethnic Identity (1984)
- Kurozumikyō and the New Religions of Japan (1985)
- Maitreya, the Future Buddha (1988)
- Marketing the Menacing Fetus in Japan (1988)
- Shintō and the State, 1868-1988 (1989)
- Asian Visions of Authority Religion and the Modern States of East and Southeast Asia (1994)
- New Directions in the Study of Meiji Japan (1997)
- The Postwar Development of Japanese Studies in the United States (1998)
- Religion and Society in Nineteenth-Century Japan: a Study of the Southern Kantō Region, using late Edo and early Meiji Gazetteers (2002)
- Shinto: A History (2017)
- Shinto Shrines in Prewar and Wartime Japan (2025)

== Honours ==
- Order of the Rising Sun, 3rd Class, Gold Rays with Neck Ribbon (2018)
