= Arai Ryoichiro =

Japanese businessman

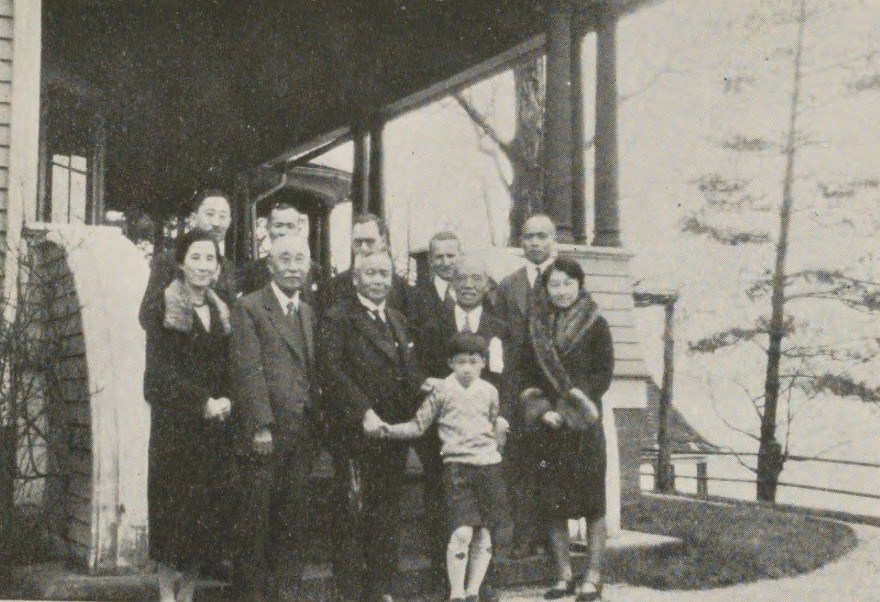
The Arai family at their home in Riverside, Connecticut

Arai Ryoichiro (新井 領一郎) (August 31, 1855 – April 10, 1939) was a Japanese businessman. He helped to build trade relationships between the United States and Japan, especially in the silk industry.

== Early life and education ==
Arai was born Ryosuke Hoshino on August 31, 1855, in what is now Kiryu, Gunma. He was adopted by the Arai family, and his given name was changed to Ryoichiro. His older brother, Chotaro Hoshino, had a silk production business. Arai studied English and accounting at several schools in Tokyo. After graduation, Chotaro encouraged Arai to go to the United States so that Arai could help his business.

== Career ==
In March 1876, Yukichi Fukuzawa advised Arai and five other men to go to New York City to promote trade. While living there, Arai studied English at the Plymouth Institute in Brooklyn Heights. Later that year, Arai made a deal to sell B. Richardson and Sons, a silk importer, 400 pounds of raw silk from Chotaro's company for $6.50 per pound. However, that was far under the market value for silk in Japan at the time. Chotaro's company lost $2,000 after Arai refused to renegotiate the contract with Richardson. He didn't want to renegotiate so that he could keep Richardson's trust, because Japanese silk merchants had a bad reputation at the time. Richardson gave them a bonus when the silk arrived. This was the first direct shipment of Japanese silk to the United States.

In 1878, Arai and Momotaro Sato, one of the other men Fukuzawa sent, started the Sato Arai Company. Arai also worked as the Doshin Kaisha's New York representative from 1880 onward. The Sato Arai Company dissolved when Sato returned to Japan in 1881. However, the company was successful enough that Arai was able to return to Japan and marry Tazu Ushiba. They returned to New York, then moved to Riverside, Connecticut in 1893. They had two children.

Arai resigned from the Doshin Kaisha and temporarily returned to Japan in 1893. While there, he started two companies: the Yokohama Kiito Gomei Kaisha, a silk exporter, and the Morimura Arai Company, which handled the former's direct sales in the United States. The latter was a partnership with Ichizaemon Morimura. By 1908, the Morimura Arai Company handled 30% of all silk exports to the United States and cotton imports from the United States to Japan.

Arai was elected to the board of governors for the Silk Association of America in 1901, and was the first Asian to hold that position. He also helped to found Japanese community organizations in New York, like the Nippon Club in 1905 and the Japan Society of New York in 1907. He was awarded the Order of the Sacred Treasure in 1928.

Arai died in Connecticut on April 10, 1939. Haru Reischauer and Tane Matsukata are his granddaughters.
