= Kōjirō Matsukata =

Japanese businessman

- 松方 幸次郎
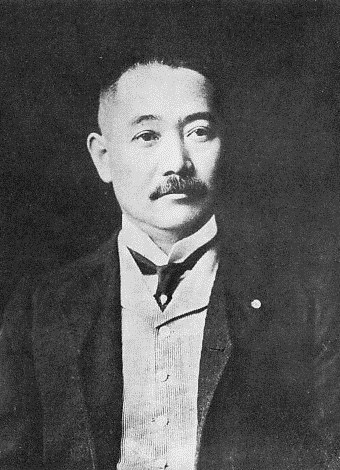
- Matsukata in 1913

Member of the House of Representatives
- In office 20 February 1936 – 18 December 1945
- Preceded by: Hara Kō
- Succeeded by: Constituency abolished
- Constituency: Kagoshima 1st
- In office 15 May 1912 – 25 December 1914
- Preceded by: Ikkyū Sakurai
- Succeeded by: Shinkichi Tamura
- Constituency: Kobe City

Personal details
- Born: 17 January 1865 Satsuma, Kagoshima, Japan
- Died: 24 June 1950 (aged 85) Kamakura, Kanagawa, Japan
- Resting place: Aoyama Cemetery
- Party: Independent
- Other political affiliations: IRAA (1940–1945); JPP (1945–1946)
- Parent: Matsukata Masayoshi (father)
- Relatives: Shigeharu Matsumoto (son-in-law)
- Education: Rutgers University
- Occupation: Businessman, art collector

Kōjirō Matsukata (松方 幸次郎, Matsukata Kōjirō; January 17, 1865 – June 24, 1950) was a Japanese businessman who, in parallel to his professional activities, devoted his life and fortune to amassing a collection of Western art which, he hoped, would become the nucleus of a Japanese national museum focused particularly on masterworks of the Western art tradition. Although his plans were not realized in his lifetime, his vision is partly realized in Japan's National Museum of Western Art (NMWA) in Ueno Park, central Tokyo. where part of his collection is exhibited.

== Early years ==
Born in Satsuma, Kagoshima, Matsukata was the third son of the early Meiji period Finance Minister and genrō, Matsukata Masayoshi who was also Japan's fourth prime minister.

== Business career ==
After being educated in the United States at Rutgers Preparatory School and studying at Rutgers University (where he was a member of the Delta Upsilon fraternity and a member of the freshman football team) Kōjirō Matsukata became president of Kawasaki Shipbuilding Company (Kawasaki Shōzō) in 1896. He then went on to become head of Kawasaki Dockyards from 1916 through 1923, which was the group's main company.

As such he led the expansion of shipbuilding activities, both commercial and military, and created various other businesses, including a major shipping line, Kawasaki Kisen Kaisha also known as K Line.

These companies progressively evolved into a major global engineering and industrial conglomerate, which ultimately took the name of Kawasaki Heavy Industries in 1969.

The financial success he enjoyed in the early part of the century was later affected adversely by economic downturns in the 1920s and 1930s; but much of his art collection remained intact despite the collapse of his business interests.

== Art collecting ==
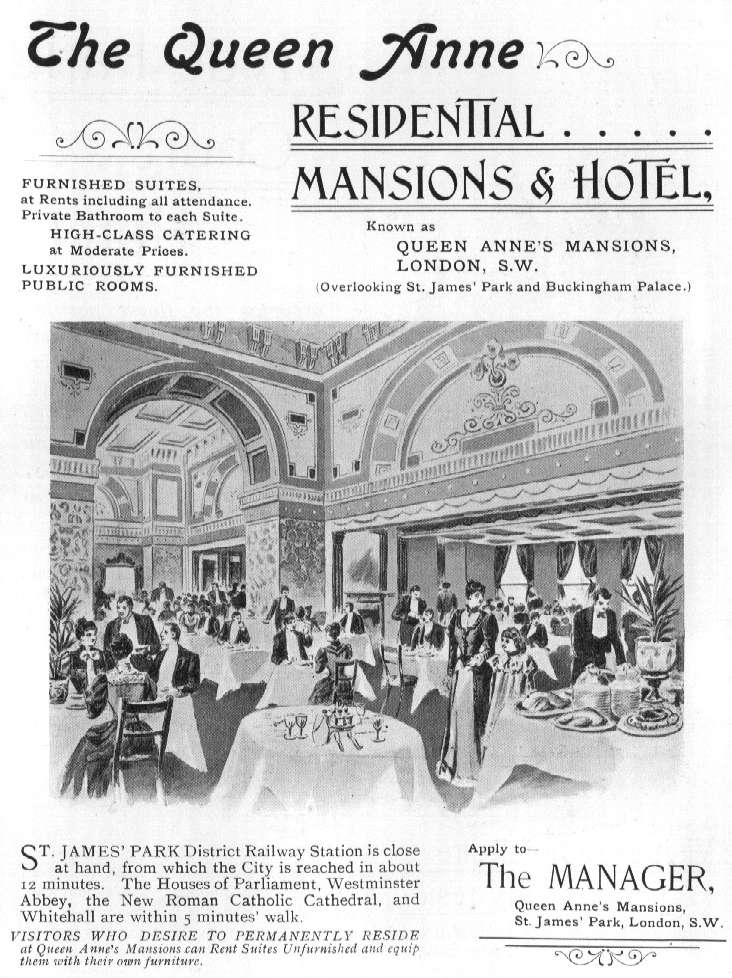
Queen Anne's Interior in 1901

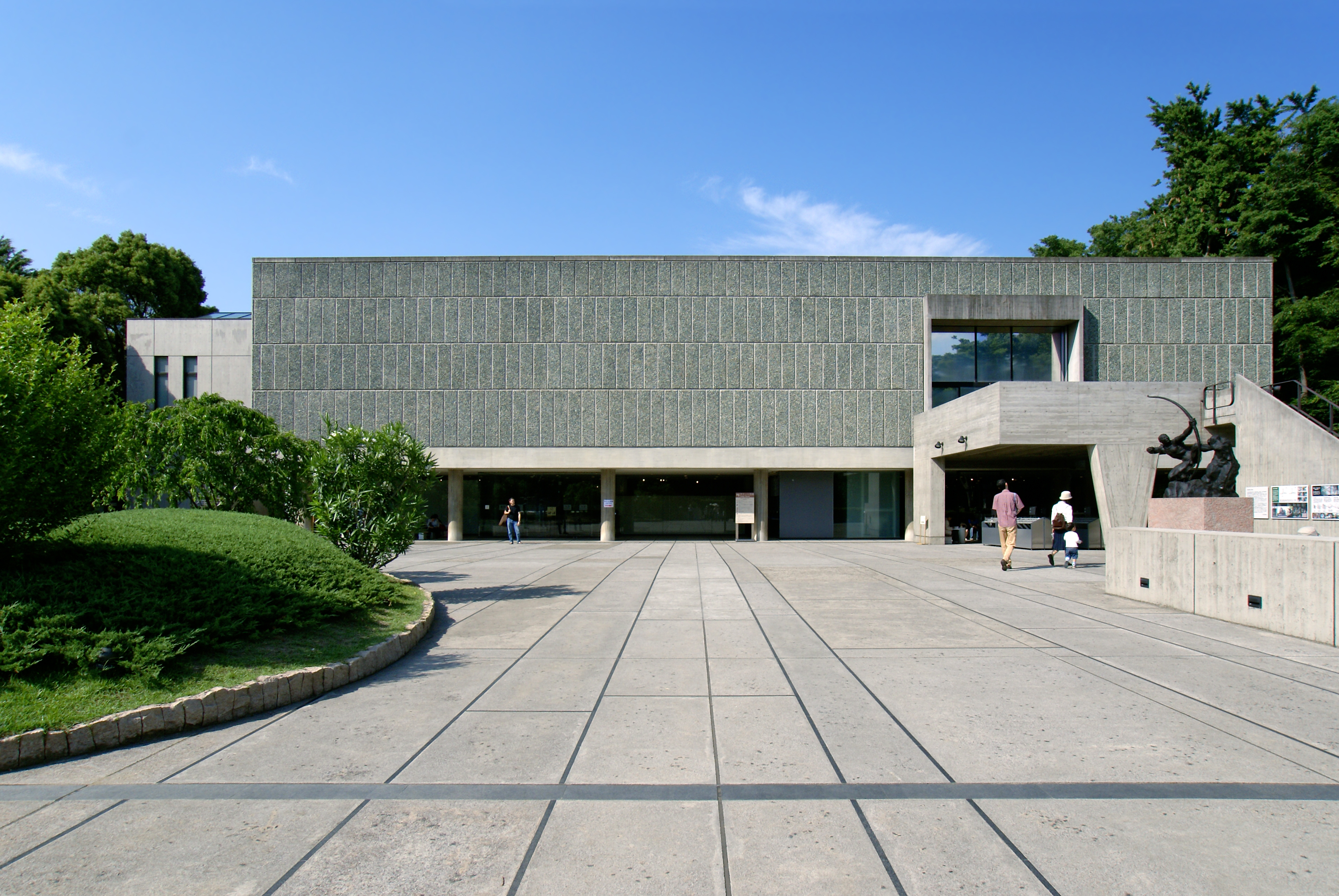
Entrance plaza at National Museum of Western Art

Matsukata lived in the United Kingdom in London at Queen Anne's Mansions from 1916 until November 1918 based in the Suzuki and Co. offices, he frequented the Japanese Club (Nihonjin Kai) where he met with artists, dealers and collectors in the Japanese community such as Sadajirō Yamanaka, Ishibashi Kazunori and Frank Brangwyn; first at Leicester Square and later Cavendish Square; where he spent £2000 to help remodel the club building in 1918. He owned over 220 of Brangwyn's works and they often met to discuss Japanese and European art.

Matsukata invested his significant personal fortune in the acquisition of several thousand examples of Western painting, sculpture and decorative arts. He collected these art works throughout Europe, largely in Paris. Matsukata bought the Rodin masterpiece, "Gates of Hell", which is currently to be seen at the Rodin Museum in Paris; and the sculptures on display in the NMWA entrance plaza were made from the same original molds. In the end, he hoped to see his collections in an art museum in Tokyo where visitors could come into direct contact with Western art, and he wanted the people of Tokyo to enjoy the same degree of easy access to great art which was available to Parisians. Named "Kyorakukan", it was designed by Frank Brangwyn in a modern architectural style for its time, which could have become the most important Western art museum in East Asia had it been built.

Matsukata is also famous for his collection of ukiyo-e woodblock prints which had been scattered throughout the world. The 1925 exhibition of the woodblock prints Matsukata collected abroad is thought to have been the first of its kind in Japan. Today about 8,000 ukiyo-e prints from the Matsukata collection are housed in the Tokyo National Museum.

Matsukata was well known as a good friend of Claude Monet. It has been reported that once, when Monet offered him the opportunity to buy whatever he wanted in the studio at Giverny, he purchased 18 paintings. His other artist friends included Frank Brangwyn, who assisted Matsukata in the acquisition of his collection. Brangwyn designed a gallery, the so-called Palace of Shared Pleasure, which Matsukata intended to build in Tokyo.

He had originally intended to bring all these artworks to Japan, but he balked at the 100% tax imposed on imports. Much of what was stored in Britain was destroyed by fires during World War II; and much of what remained in Japan was also destroyed by Allied bombing during the Pacific War. The combination of factors which kept so much of his collecting activities intact was only seen by the Japanese public for the first time in 1959 when they visited the museum he had envisaged.

Among these works collected by Matsukata, those known today as the NMWA Matsukata Collection were initially stored in French museums under the supervision of the famous French art museum curator Léonce Bénédite. They remained in France until after World War II, and, as part of the San Francisco Peace Treaty, they were briefly confiscated by France. The French government eventually decided to give back the majority of those artworks to the Japanese government as a sign of the renewed amity between the two countries, except for 14 valuable paintings by Monet, Van Gogh, Courbet, Cézanne, and others which were retained to fill in gaps in the French national collection.

The remaining objects in the Matsukata collection totaled 370 works, including 196 paintings, 80 drawings, 26 prints and 63 sculptures—including massive public statuary by Rodin which now grace the landscaped area in front of the entrance to NMWA. Each of the Rodin sculptures in the NMWA collection were cast from the original molds. In fact, as it happens, Matsukata was the one who paid for the best Rodin castings in France today, but he didn't quite manage to bring them back to Japan, which is how they fell into French hands at the end of World War II. These artworks, designated as the Matsukata Collection, were returned by France to Japan in 1959, which led to the opening of the National Museum of Western Art.

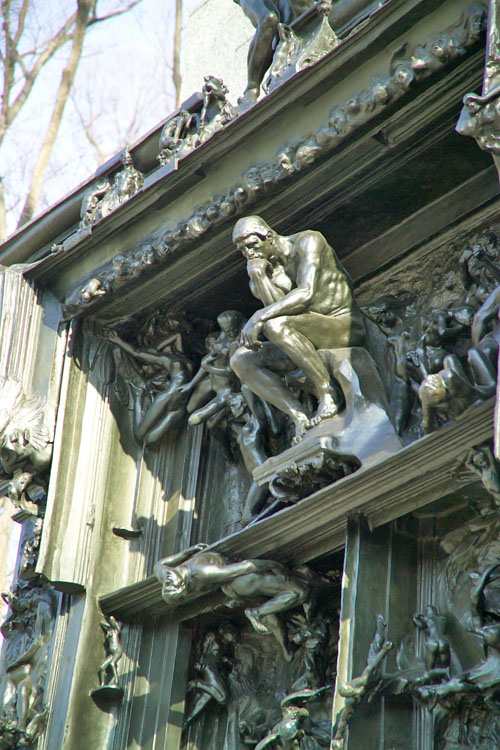
A "Thinker"-like detail above the closed doors of the entrance at Rodin's "Gates of Hell" in front of the National Museum of Western Art

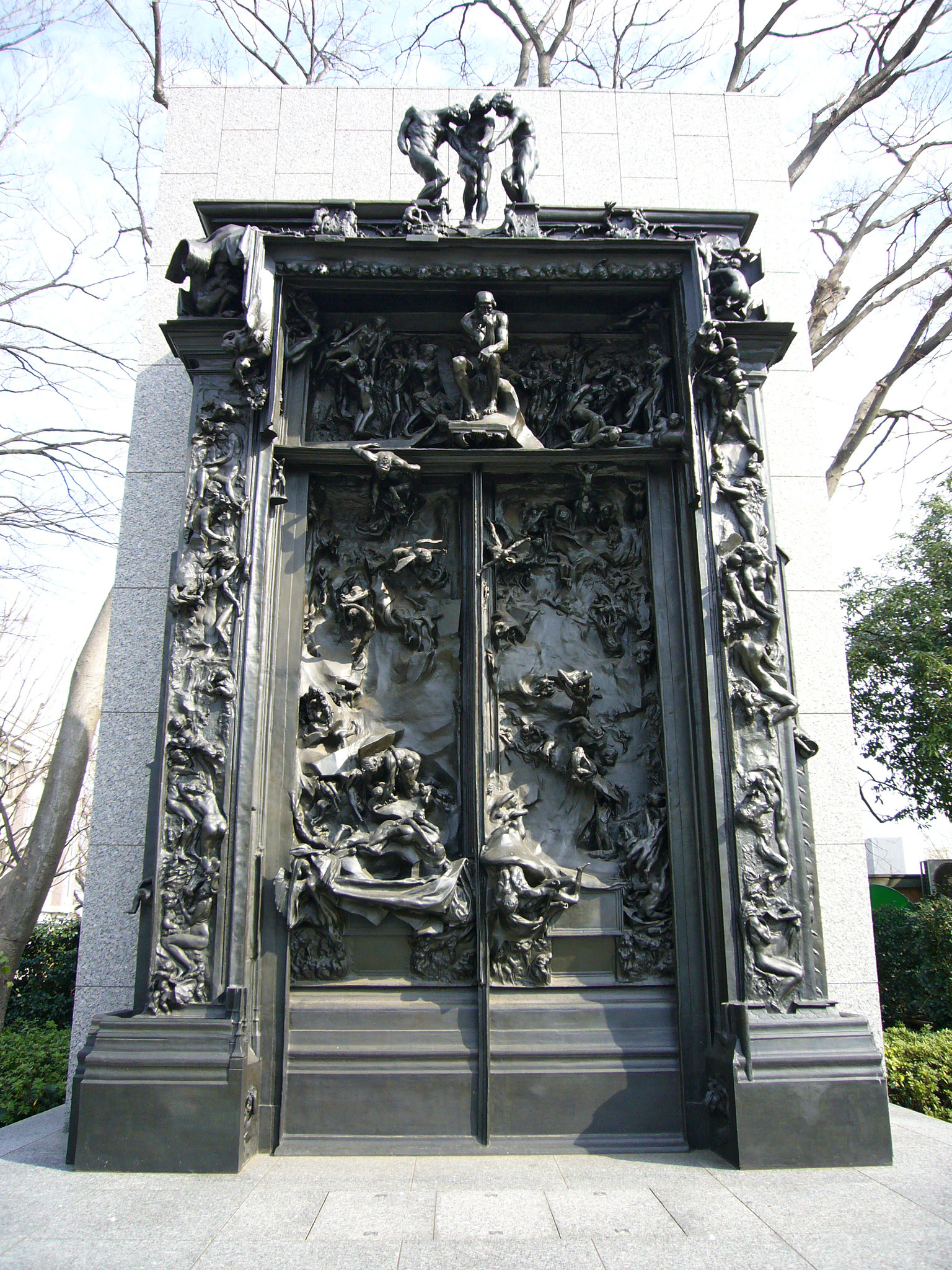
Rodin's "Gates of Hell" near entrance to NMWA in Tokyo

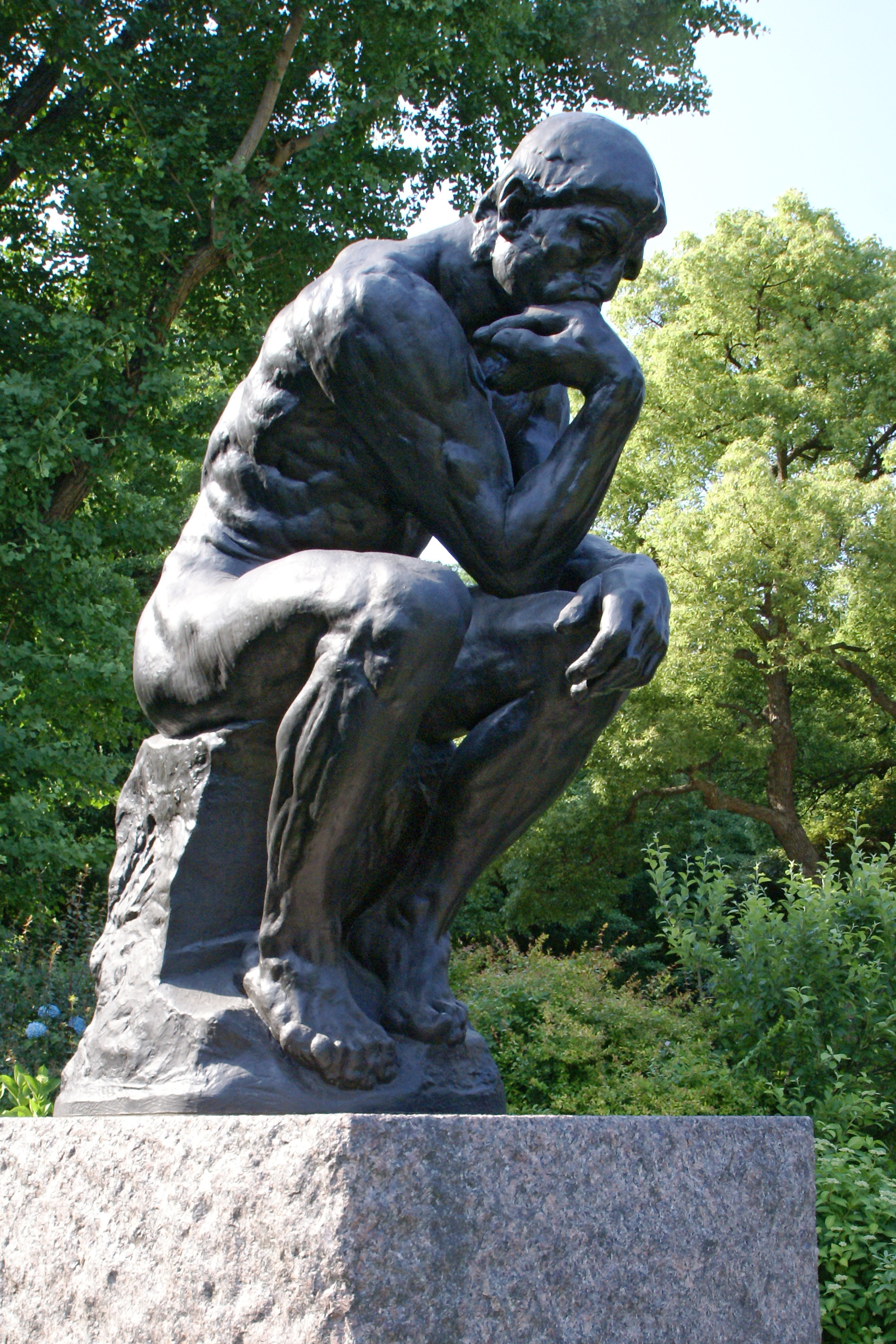
Rodin's "The Thinker" near the entrance of the National Museum of Western Art.
