= Edwin O. Reischauer =

American diplomat and educator (1910–1990)

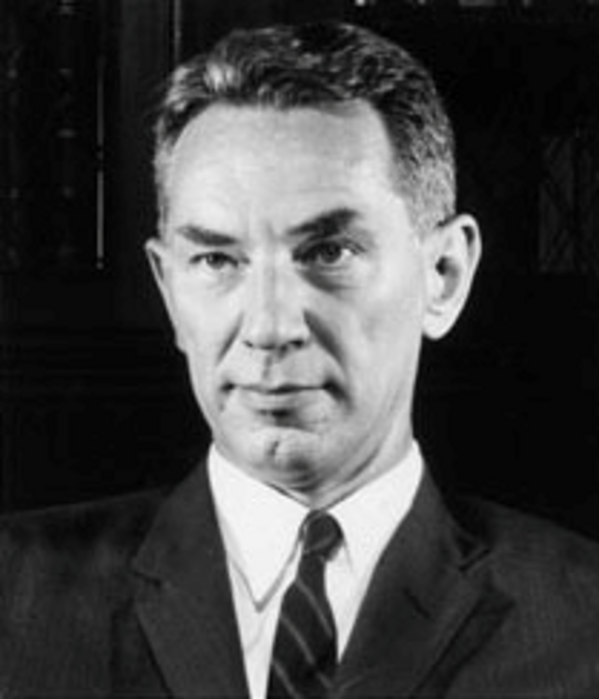
- Born: Edwin Oldfather Reischauer; October 15, 1910; Tokyo, Empire of Japan
- Died: September 1, 1990 (aged 79); La Jolla, California, U.S.
- Education: Oberlin College (AB); Harvard University (PhD)
- Spouse(s): Elinor Adrienne Danton (widowed in 1956); Haru Matsukata
- Children: 3, including Robert Reischauer
- Father: August Karl Reischauer
- Scientific career
- Fields: Japanology; East Asian studies
- Workplaces: United States Ambassador to Japan (1961–1966); Harvard University
- Thesis: Nittō guhō junrei gyōki: Ennin's Diary of His Travels in T'ang China, 838–847 (1939)
- Doctoral advisor: Serge Elisséeff
- Doctoral students: Gail Lee Bernstein; John W. Dower; John Curtis Perry
- Other notable students: Sen. Jay Rockefeller

Edwin Oldfather Reischauer (/ˈraɪʃaʊ.ər/ RYSHE-ow-ər; October 15, 1910 – September 1, 1990) was an American diplomat, educator, and professor at Harvard University. Born in Tokyo to American educational missionaries, he became a leading scholar of the history and culture of Japan and East Asia. Together with George M. McCune, a scholar of Korea and several Korean linguists, in 1939 he developed the McCune–Reischauer romanization of the Korean language.

Reischauer became involved in helping create US policy toward East Asia during and after World War II. President John F. Kennedy appointed Reischauer as the United States Ambassador to Japan, where he served from 1961 to 1966. Reischauer founded the Japan Institute at Harvard University in 1973 and served as its first director. It was later named in honor of him.

== Early life and education ==
Reischauer was born in Tokyo, Japan, the son of Helen Sidwell (Oldfather) and August Karl Reischauer, Presbyterian educational missionaries. His father helped found the Tokyo Woman's Christian University along with Nitobe Inazō and Yasui Tetsu. His mother founded the Japan Deaf Oral School, the first of its kind in Japan. He and his younger brother Robert attended the American School in Japan before going to the United States for college. Both did graduate work in Asian studies. Edwin graduated with a AB from Oberlin in 1931. On his 75th birthday, Reischauer recalled publicly that his aim in life after graduating in 1931 was to draw American attention to Asia.

Reischauer earned his PhD from Harvard University in 1939. He was a student of the Russian-French Japanologist Serge Elisséeff, who had been the first Western graduate of the University of Tokyo. His doctoral dissertation was "Nittō guhō junrei gyōki: Ennin's Diary of His Travels in T'ang China, 838–847," a study and translation of the Japanese monk Ennin's travelogues on his journeys in China during the Tang dynasty. Ennin's work, Record of a Pilgrimage to China in Search of the Law (入唐求法巡礼行記; Middle Chinese: Nyip-Dang gjuw-pjop zwin-léi hæng-kì), is written in Classical Chinese. Reischauer's work shows the high level of Sinological scholarship that a graduate student was expected to demonstrate.

== Wartime service ==
By October 1940, Reischauer had become aware of the possibility of war with Japan. He wrote a memorandum for the U.S. Navy pointing out that very few Americans knew the kind of written Japanese that was used in military situations and hardly any could read Japanese that had been handwritten in a hurry. His solution was to create a Japanese language school to train linguists in advance. Reischauer's warning did not go unheeded. It landed on the desk of Lieutenant (later Commander) Albert Hindmarsh of the U.S. Navy, and he agreed that there were indeed few competent Japanese-speaking officers available. The result was the creation of the U.S. Navy Japanese Language School, which spent most of the war at Boulder, Colorado. In the summer of 1942, at the request of the U.S. Army Signal Corps, Reischauer started running a top-secret course at Arlington Hall in Virginia. Arlington Hall had been a women's college, but it was taken over by the US Army Signal Intelligence Service in June 1942 and functioned like Bletchley Park in England as a secret cryptanalysis centre.

== Teaching career ==
Reischauer had a 40-year teaching career at Harvard. He and John King Fairbank developed a popular undergraduate survey of East Asian history and culture. The course, which was known as "Rice Paddies", was the basis for their widely influential textbooks, East Asia: The Great Tradition (1958) and East Asia: The Modern Transformation (1965). Reischauer wrote both for fellow scholars and for the general public, including Japan: Story of a Nation, which was published in several editions.

He served as director of the Harvard–Yenching Institute and chairman of the Department of Far Eastern Languages. For his farewell lecture at the Yenching Institute in 1981, students had to compete for seats with faculty colleagues, university officials, and a television crew from Japan.

In that crowded scene, he said, "As I remember, there were only two graduate students interested in East Asian studies when I first came here: myself and my brother."

== Ambassador to Japan ==
Reischauer was appointed US Ambassador to Japan by President John F. Kennedy in the spring of 1961, at a time when US-Japan relations were at a low point following the massive 1960 protests in Japan against the US-Japan Security Treaty. In the immediate aftermath of the protests, Reischauer had traveled to Japan and spoken with various Japanese friends and associates to get a Japanese point of view on the protests. After returning to the United States, Reischauer attracted the attention of Kennedy's transition team when he wrote an article about the protests in the prominent policy journal Foreign Affairs called "The Broken Dialogue with Japan." In this article Reischauer rejected the notion, put forth by the Eisenhower administration, that the protests had been a communist plot. Instead, he argued that the protests reflected real grievances on the part of the Japanese in relation to US, and were exacerbated by a failure by American leaders to reach out to Japanese opinion leaders and try to understand Japanese concerns. Reischauer argued forcefully that only skillful and nuanced diplomacy could repair this "broken dialogue."

On the advice of his advisors, Kennedy decided that Reischauer himself would be the best candidate for the job, and nominated Reischauer to be his first (and only) ambassador to Japan. This was a break with precedent, because previous ambassadors to Japan had been career State Department officials who had no special connection with Japan. In fact, State Department officials viewed strong connections with an ambassador's host country with suspicion and opposed Reischauer's nomination on these grounds. However, Kennedy prevailed and Reischauer became the first US ambassador to Japan who actually knew the local language.

As Ambassador, Reischauer worked to repair the recent rift in US-Japan relations. Reischauer made "equal partnership" the watchword of his time as ambassador, and constantly pushed for more equal treatment of Japan. He advocated and helped arrange a summit meeting between Kennedy and new Japanese prime minister Hayato Ikeda in Washington, D.C. in the summer of 1961. Historian Nick Kapur has argued that this summit was a success, and led to a substantial realignment of the US-Japan alliance in the direction of greater mutuality. Reischauer hoped to return the favor by having Kennedy become the first sitting US president to visit Japan. Kennedy was agreeable, and initial preparations were made, but Kennedy was assassinated before he could make the visit and Secretary of State Dean Rusk went in his place in early 1964. Reischauer also embarked on a nationwide listening tour in Japan; although he did not reach his goal of visiting all 47 prefectures by the end of his time in office, he did manage to visit 39 of them. Reischauer's great efforts to charm the Japanese people were jocularly nicknamed the "Reischauer Offensive" (Raishawā rosen) by the Japanese press (sometimes alternatively, the "Kennedy-Reischauer Offensive").

Reischauer's time as ambassador was seen as a success, and he stayed in the role until 1966, continuing on under the administration of Lyndon B. Johnson. However, his time as ambassador ended on two notes of tragedy. Toward the end of his ambassadorship, Reischauer increasingly had to defend the US war in Vietnam, and increasingly felt uncomfortable doing so, ultimately leading to his resignation. In addition, Reischauer was hospitalized in March 1964 after being stabbed by Shiotani Norikazu, a Japanese youth, in an apparent assassination attempt. Shiotani had a history of mental illness and had Ménière's disease, a disorder of the inner ear. He felt that he had not been properly treated by the American occupation and wished to draw attention to this cause by assassinating Reischauer. The attacker apparently acted alone and had no connection to any group. In the aftermath of the violence, Japan's Minister of Public Safety was compelled to resign. Reischauer received a blood transfusion and recovered from his wound, but the transfusion he received in the hospital was tainted with hepatitis C virus, which would lead to a variety of ailments for Reischauer in future years, and ultimately contribute to his death 26 years later.

== Personal life ==
Reischauer married (Elinor) Adrienne Danton in Tokyo on July 5, 1935. They had three children together. She died in 1955 of a heart ailment. Author James A. Michener introduced the widower to Haru Matsukata at the Foreign Correspondents Club in Tokyo in 1955. They married on January 16, 1956. They learned that, as teenagers, they had attended the same Tokyo high school. Haru confessed to having had a secret crush on him. Together they became a formidable team. They jointly designed their house in Belmont, Massachusetts. It is operated and used today as the Edwin O. Reischauer Memorial House.

== Later life ==
In 1973, Reischauer was the founding Director of the Japan Institute at Harvard University. It was renamed the Edwin O. Reischauer Institute of Japanese Studies in his honor when he turned 75, in 1985.

Reischauer was also honored in 1985 by the opening of the Edwin O. Reischauer Center for East Asian Studies at the Paul H. Nitze School of Advanced International Studies (SAIS), part of Johns Hopkins University. Speaking at the dedication ceremonies in Baltimore, Senator Jay Rockefeller, one of Reischauer's former students, described Reischauer as being "what a teacher is meant to be, one who can change the life of his students." At the same event, Japan's ambassador, Nabuo Matsunaga, read a personal message from Prime Minister Yasuhiro Nakasone: "I know of no other man who has so thoroughly understood Japan."

== Illness and death ==
For the last decade of his life, Reischauer was afflicted by a variety of ailments and illnesses related to the hepatitis infection he had contracted from tainted blood following the attempt on his life while serving as US Ambassador to Japan. As a result of these ailments, Reischauer had to withdraw from active teaching and lecturing. Finally, in 1990, Reischauer succumbed to complications of hepatitis C.

== Impact on US foreign policy ==
Reischauer promoted US foreign policy both in public and in government on Japan and the rest of Asia after World War II and during the Vietnam War.

=== World War II and afterward ===
On September 14, 1942, three years before the end of World War II, Reischauer, then an instructor in Far Eastern languages at Harvard University, wrote the "Memorandum on Policy towards Japan." It laid out a plan on how the US could attain its postwar objective of "winning the peace" in Asia.

According to historian Takashi Fujitani, the memo revealed a "condescension toward Japanese people" and a "purely instrumentalist and manipulative stance." In the abstract to his article, "The Reischauer Memo: Mr. Moto, Hirohito, and Japanese American Soldiers," Fujitani wrote:

Already at this early date in the war, Reischauer proposed retention of the Japanese emperor as head of a postwar “puppet regime” that would serve U.S. interests in East Asia. He also argued that Japanese Americans had until then been a “sheer liability” and that the United States could turn them into an “asset” by enlisting them in the U.S. military. He reasoned that Japanese American soldiers would be useful for propaganda purposes – that is, to demonstrate to the world and particularly the “yellow and brown peoples” that the United States was not a racist nation.

=== Myth of saving Kyoto ===
During the war, Reischauer served as a Japan expert for the US Army Intelligence Service. A myth developed after the war that he had prevented the US from a nuclear bombing of Kyoto. Robert Jungk, in his memoir about the war and atomic scientists, claimed that Reischauer convinced his boss to persuade Secretary of War Henry L. Stimson not to bomb Kyoto, and to have it crossed off the black list of potential sites.

Reischauer specifically denied that popular myth:

I probably would have done this if I had ever had the opportunity, but there is not a word of truth to it. As has been amply proved by my friend Otis Cary of Doshisha in Kyoto, the only person deserving credit for saving Kyoto from destruction is Henry L. Stimson, the Secretary of War at the time, who had known and admired Kyoto ever since his honeymoon there several decades earlier.

In the process of refuting the myth concerning himself, Reischauer perpetrated another myth, in that both of Stimson's visits to Kyoto came more than 30 years after he and his wife married, meaning that they weren't a "honeymoon".

=== US bases in Okinawa ===
A secret memorandum, declassified in 1996, detailed a conversation among top US military and civilian officials on July 16, 1965, in Tokyo. Reischauer, then serving as the US Ambassador to Japan, proposed a plan to enable the US both to keep its military bases and to introduce nuclear weapons in Okinawa after the reversion of the US-occupied islands to Japanese sovereignty. Reischauer based his strategy on the symbolic political importance of reversion for Japan's conservative ruling party, but argued that the US did not have to "give Japan any real say in the use of our bases."

He said that "if Japan would accept nuclear weapons on Japanese soil, including Okinawa, and if it would provide us with assurances guaranteeing our military commanders effective control of the islands in time of military crisis, then we would be able to keep our bases on the islands, even though 'full sovereignty' reverted to Japan."

These "became key elements [of] the 1969 U.S.-Japan Okinawa Reversion Agreement," effectively making "U.S. military presence more or less permanent and maintaining the option to introduce nuclear weapons." In a 1981 article, Time reported: "Former U.S. Ambassador to Japan Edwin O. Reischauer revealed that ...U.S. naval vessels carrying nuclear weapons have routinely visited Japanese ports—with Tokyo's tacit approval."

The secret memo also revealed Reischauer's proposed countermeasures to quell "nationalistic reaction" to continuing US military presence in Okinawa. In his 2010 article, "'Secret' 1965 Memo Reveals Plans to Keep U.S. bases and Nuclear Weapons Options in Okinawa After Reversion," Steve Rabson, author and lecturer on Okinawan literature, history, and culture, wrote:

To reduce the risk of “disturbances” in Okinawa, Reischauer proposed an increase in U.S. aid, revision of the Price Act to increase compensation for owners of land the U.S. had seized for base construction, and a loosening of the ban on flying the Japanese flag. It is difficult to measure precisely his influence at the time, but all three of these recommendations became U.S. policy.

== Romanization of Korean ==
With George M. McCune, Reischauer in 1939 published the McCune–Reischauer system for romanization of the Korean language, which became the most-widely used system for many years.

Reischauer called Hangul, the Korean alphabet, "perhaps the most scientific system of writing in general use in any language."

== Honors ==
- Elected to the American Academy of Arts and Sciences, 1957
- Grand Cordon of the Order of the Rising Sun, 1968
- Elected to the American Philosophical Society, 1973
- Japan Foundation Award, 1975
- Edwin O. Reischauer Center for East Asian Studies at Johns Hopkins, 1984.
- Edwin O. Reischauer Institute of Japanese Studies (RIJS) at Harvard, 1985
- Edwin O. Reischauer Lectures, series of lectures from 1986 given at Harvard

== Notable students ==
- Gail Lee Bernstein (University of Arizona)
- Albert M. Craig (Harvard University)
- John W. Dower (Massachusetts Institute of Technology)
- John Whitney Hall (Yale University)
- Howard Hibbett (Harvard University)
- Marius Jansen (Princeton University)
- Joyce Chapman Lebra (University of Colorado)
- John Curtis Perry (The Fletcher School, Tufts University)
- Sen. Jay Rockefeller
- Robert A. Scalapino (University of California at Berkeley)
- Conrad Totman (Yale University)
- Edward Willett Wagner (Harvard University)

== Selected bibliography ==
The statistical overview of writings by and about Reischauer, OCLC/WorldCat encompasses some 300 works in more than 1000 publications in 18 languages and more than 23,000 library holdings.

- The Romanization of the Korean language, Based Upon Its Phonetic Structure (1939) with G. M. McCune
- Elementary Japanese for University Students (1942) with S. Elisséeff
- Japan: Past and Present (1946; rev. ed. 1952, 1964)
- The United States and Japan (1950; rev. ed. 1957, 1965)
- Translations from Early Japanese Literature (1951) with Joseph Yamagiwa
- Ennin's Travels in T'ang China (1955; reprinted, Angelico Press, 2020)
- Ennin's Diary: The Record of a Pilgrimage to China in Search of the Law (1955; reprinted, Angelico Press, 2020), translated from Chinese
- Wanted: An Asian Policy (1955)
- Our Asian Frontiers of Knowledge (1958)
- East Asia: The Great Tradition (1960) with J. K. Fairbank
- East Asia, The Modern Transformation (1965) with J. K. Fairbank and A. M. Craig
- A History of East Asian Civilization (1965)
- Beyond Vietnam: The United States and Asia (1968)
- Japan: The Story of a Nation (1970; rev. ed. 1974, 1981, 1990)
- A New Look at Modern History (1972)
- Translations from Early Japanese Literature (1972) with Joseph K. Yamagiwa
- Toward the 21st century: Education for a Changing World (1973)
- East Asia, Tradition and Transformation (1973; rev. ed. 1989) with J. K. Fairbank and A. M. Craig
- The Japanese (1977)
- My Life between Japan and America (1986, autobiography)
- The United States and Japan in 1986: Can the Partnership Work? (1986)
- The Japanese Today: Change and Continuity (1988; rev. ed. with Marius B. Jansen 1995)
- Japan, Tradition and Transformation (1989)

== See also ==
- Edwin O. Reischauer Memorial House
- Ennin's Diary: The Record of a Pilgrimage to China in Search of the Law
- McCune–Reischauer romanization

== General sources ==
- Chapin, Emerson. "Edwin Reischauer, Diplomat and Scholar, Dies at 79", The New York Times. September 2, 1990.
- Deptula, Nancy Monteith and Michael M. Hess. (1996). The Edwin O. Reischauer Institute of Japanese Studies: A Twenty-Year Chronicle. Cambridge: Reischauer Institute, Harvard University.
- Haberman, Clyde. "Books, East and West: My Life Between Japan and America by Edwin O. Reischauer", The New York Times. August 20, 1986.
- Kapur, Nick (2018). Japan at the Crossroads: Conflict and Compromise after Anpo. Cambridge, MA: Harvard University Press. ISBN 978-0-6749-8442-4.
- McDowell, Edwin. "Major Encyclopedia on Japan Written in English". The New York Times. October 11, 1983.
- Packard, George R. Edwin O. Reischauer and the American Discovery of Japan (New York: Columbia University Press, 2010). ISBN 978-0-231-14354-7
- Rabson, Steve. "'Secret' 1965 Memo Reveals Plans to Keep U.S. bases and Nuclear Weapons Options in Okinawa After Reversion", The Asia-Pacific Journal, 5–1–10, February 1, 2010.
- Reischauer, Edwin (1986). My Life Between Japan And America. New York: Harper & Row.
- Schulman, Frank Joseph. (1970). Japan and Korea: An Annotated Bibliography of Doctoral Dissertations in Western Languages, 1877–1969. London: Routledge. ISBN 978-0-7146-2691-8
- Zurndorfer, Harriet Thelma. (1995). China Bibliography: A Research Guide to Reference Works About China Past and Present. Leiden: Brill Publishers. ISBN 978-90-04-10278-1 (cloth) (reprinted by University of Hawaii Press, Honolulu, 1999). ISBN 978-0-8248-2212-5 (paper)

Diplomatic posts
Preceded by Douglas MacArthur II	United States Ambassador to Japan; 1961–1966	Succeeded by U. Alexis Johnson
