= List of biographical dictionaries =

This is an incomplete list of biographical dictionaries.

== International ==
- A Biographical Dictionary of Railway Engineers (1978) ISBN 0715374893
- Biographical Dictionary of the Extreme Right Since 1890
- Akyeampong, Emmanuel and Gates, Henry Louis Jr., eds. Dictionary of African Biography (Oxford, 2012)
- Amit, Vered, Biographical Dictionary of Social and Cultural Anthropology.
- Anderson, Gerald with Robert Coote, eds, Biographical Dictionary of Christian Missions, Grand Rapids, Michigan: William B. Eerdmans, 1999. ISBN 0-8028-4680-7. ISBN 978-0-8028-4680-8.
- Anderson, Roger, Psychics, Sensitives, and Somnambules: A Biographical Dictionary with Bibliographies, Jefferson / London: McFarland, 2006. ISBN 0-7864-2770-1.
- Arestis & Sawyer, A Biographical Dictionary of Dissenting Economists.
- Baker, Theodore & Alfred Remy, Baker's Biographical Dictionary of Musicians.
- Biographical Dictionary of Evangelicals.
- Biographical Dictionary of Organists, Composers for Organ and Organ Builders
- Biographical Dictionary 17th, 18th, and 19th century European Mennonite church leaders, The Mennonite Quarterly Review,
- Brown, Stuart, Biographical Dictionary of Twentieth-Century Philosophers, edited by Robert Wilkinson and Diane Collinson.
- Browning, D. C. Everyman's Dictionary of Literary Biography: English & American. Compiled after John W Cousin. London: J. M. Dent & Sons Ltd. New York: E. P. Dutton & Co. Inc. First published 1958. Revised edition. 1960.
- Carey, Patrick & Joseph Lienhard, Biographical Dictionary of Christian Theologians.
- Chambers Biographical Dictionary, ISBN 978-0-550-10693-3.
- Claghorn, Charles Eugene, Women Composers and Songwriters: a concise biographical dictionary.
- Cohn-Sherbok, Daniel, Dictionary of Jewish Biography.
- Contemporary Authors, Gale.
- Cousin, John William, 1910, A Short Biographical Dictionary of English Literature, London: J. M. Dent & Sons; New York: E. P. Dutton.
- Crystal, David, ed, The Cambridge Biographical Dictionary.
- De Haan, Deskalova, Loutfi, De Haan, A Biographical Dictionary of Women's Movements and Feminisms: Central, Eastern and South Eastern Europe, 19th and 20th Centuries.
- Dictionary of Scientific Biography
- Dictionary of Women Worldwide: 25,000 Women Throughout the Ages, published 2006 bu Yorkin
- Drees, Clayton, The Late Medieval Age of Crisis and Renewal, 1300–1500: A Biographical Dictionary.
- Encyclopedia of World Biography, 17 volumes, Gale, 1997. ISBN 0-7876-2546-9. ISBN 978-0-7876-2546-7.
- Floyd Jr., Samuel A. International Dictionary of Black Composers (1999). ed. Chicago: Fitzroy Dearborn. ISBN 9781884964275
- Frank, Jane, Science Fiction and Fantasy Artists of the Twentieth Century: A Biographical Dictionary.
- Fredriksen, John, Biographical Dictionary of Modern World Leaders.
- Freeland, David, Baker's Biographical Dictionary of Popular Musicians Since 1990.
- General Dictionary, Historical and Critical London, J. Bettenham, 1735–1741
- Harvey, Joy, and Marilyn Ogilvie, eds., The Biographical Dictionary of Women in Science. ISBN 0-415-92038-8. ISBN 978-0-415-92038-4.
- Highfill, Burnim, Langhans, A Biographical Dictionary of Actors.
- Hinnells, John, Who's Who of World Religions, Macmillan. ISBN 0-14-051349-3.
- Ibn Khallikān. Ibn Khallikan's Biographical dictionary, 1. 1843. Khallikān, Ibn (1843). 2. Khallikan, Ibn (1868). 3. 4. 1871. M. de Slane trans. Oriental Translation Fund of Great Britain and Ireland, 1843.
- Ingamells, John (compiler). A Dictionary of British and Irish Travellers in Italy 1701–1800. Compiled from the Brinsley Ford Archive. Published for the Paul Mellon Centre for Studies in British Art by Yale University Press. New Haven and London. 1997. ISBN 0 300 07165 5.
- International Biographical Centre, 2000 Outstanding Intellectuals of the 21st Century.
- International Biographical Centre, Who's Who of Women.
- Keene, Henry George, An oriental biographical dictionary: founded on materials collected by the late Thomas William Beale, W.H. Allen & Co., 1894
- International Encyclopedia of Women Composers, Aaron I Cohen, 1981.
- Kiernan, T, Who's Who in the History of Philosophy, New York, 1965.
- Lentz, Harris, Biographical Dictionary of Professional Wrestling.
- Lewis, James, Peculiar Prophets: A Biographical Dictionary of New Religions, Paragon. ISBN 1-55778-768-9.
- McCabe, Joseph, A Biographical Dictionary of Ancient, Medieval, and Modern Freethinkers.
- McCabe, Joseph, A Biographical Dictionary of Modern Rationalists, London: Watts, 1920.
- McNeil, Ian, Biographical Dictionary of the History of Technology, edited by Lance Day and Ian McNeil. ISBN 0-415-19399-0. ISBN 978-0-415-19399-3.
- Mitchell, Sarah, Elizabeth Tootill, Derek Gjertsen, and John Daintith, Biographical Encyclopedia of Scientists, Taylor & Francis, 1994. ISBN 0-7503-0287-9. ISBN 978-0-7503-0287-6.
- Pleasants, Helene et al., eds, The Biographical Dictionary of Parapsychology, New York: Helix, Garrett, 1964.
- Porter, Roy, The Biographical Dictionary of Scientists, 1994. ISBN 0-19-521083-2 | ISBN 978-0-19-521083-5.
- Powell, John, Biographical Dictionary of Literary Influences: The Nineteenth Century, 1800–1914.
- E. J. Pyke, A Biographical Dictionary of Wax Modellers, Clarendon Press, 1973.
- Randel, Don Michael, ed, The Harvard Biographical Dictionary of Music, Harvard University Press.
- Rappaport, Helen, Encyclopedia of Women Social Reformers.
- Ratcliffe, Susan, People on People: The Oxford Dictionary of Biographical Quotations.
- Roszkowski % Kofman, Biographical Dictionary of Central and Eastern Europe in the Twentieth Century.
- Saunders, J.W.W., A Biographical Dictionary of Renaissance Poets and Dramatists, 1520–1650.
- Saur, K.G., International Biographical Dictionary of Central European Emigres 1933–1945.
- Sheehy, Chapman, Conroy, eds, Biographical Dictionary of Psychology
- Simpson, A. W. B., ed., Biographical Dictionary of the Common Law, London: Butterworths, 1984.
- Slonimsky, Nicolas, Baker's Biographical Dictionary of Musicians.
- Slonimsky, Nicolas, Baker's Biographical Dictionary of 20th Century Classical Musicians, edited by Laura Kuhn.
- Smith, Bonnie G., The Oxford Encyclopedia of Women in World History, Oxford University Press, 2008. ISBN 978-0-19-514890-9
- Sterling, Keir Brooks, Richard Harmond, George Cevasco, Lorne Hammond, eds, 1997, Biographical Dictionary of American and Canadian Naturalists and Environmentalists, Westport, Connecticut: Greenwood, 1997. ISBN 0-313-23047-1
- Taitz, Emily, Holocaust Survivors: A Biographical Dictionary, Greenwood, 2007. ISBN 978-0-313-33676-8. ISBN 978-0-313-06343-5
- Thomas, H, Biographical Encyclopedia of Philosophy, New York, 1965.
- Thomson, David, The New Biographical Dictionary of Film. ISBN 978-0-307-27174-7.
- Union of International Associations, ed, International Biographical Dictionary of Religion, Munich: KG Saur Verlag, 1994. ISBN 3-598-11100-2.
- Universal Biographical Dictionary, Hartford: S. Andrus & Son, 1850.
- Webster's New Biographical Dictionary, Springfield, Massachusetts: Merriam-Webster Inc. ISBN 0-87779-543-6
- Weinberg, Robert, Biographical Dictionary of Science Fiction and Fantasy Artists.
- Wheeler, Joseph Mazzini, A Biographical Dictionary of Freethinkers of All Ages and Nations.
- Who's Who in the World
- Wigoder, Geoffrey, Dictionary of Jewish Biography.
- Williams, Trevor I (editor). A Biographical Dictionary of Scientists. Adam & Charles Black. London. First Edition. 1969. Second Edition. 1974. ISBN 0 7136 1511 7.
- World Biographical Information System Online
- World Military Leaders: A Biographical Dictionary.
- World War I Biographical Dictionary
- Wright, Jonathan, Shapers of the Great Debate on the Freedom of Religion: A Biographical Dictionary, Greenwood, 2005. ISBN 0-313-31889-1.

== Australia ==
- Australian Dictionary of Biography
- Dictionary of Australian Biography
- Dictionary of Western Australians
- Dictionary of Australian Artists Online
- Who is Who in Australia

== Belgium ==
- Biographie Nationale de Belgique (1866–1986)
- Nouvelle Biographie Nationale (1988-)
- Nationaal Biografisch Woordenboek (1964-)
- Biographie Coloniale Belge, later Biographie Belge d'Outre-Mer (1948–2015)
- Encyclopédie du Mouvement wallon (2000–2010)
- Encyclopedie van de Vlaamse Beweging (1975)
- Nieuwe Encyclopedie van de Vlaamse Beweging (1998)
- De Belgische Beeldende Kunstenaars uit de 19de en 20ste eeuw (1999)

== Brazil ==
- Sacramento Blake, Augusto Vitorino Alves, Dicionário Bibliográfico Brasileiro. Rio de Janeiro: Typographia Nacional, 1883.
- Ermakoff, George. Dicionário Biográfico Ilustrado de Personalidades da História do Brasil. Rio de Janeiro: G. Ermakoff, 2012. ISBN 978-8598815268
- Dicionário Mulheres do Brasil – org. by Schuma Schumaher and Érico Vital Brasil, Jorge Zahar Editor, 2000. ISBN 9788571105737
- Flávio Gomes, Jaime Lauriano and Lilia Moritz Schwarcz, Enciclopédia negra: biografias afro-brasileiras, São Paulo, Companhia das Letras, 2021. ISBN 9788535934007

== Canada ==
- Biographical Dictionary of Architects in Canada, 1800–1950
- Dictionary of Canadian Biography
- Canadian Who's Who, published by University of Toronto Press
- A Cyclopaedia of Canadian Biography (Vol. 1, 1886; Vol. 2, 1888; Vol. 3, 1919.)

== China and Chinese ==
- Biographical Dictionary of Chinese Christianity
- Biographical Dictionary of Occupied China (Online)
- Howard L. Boorman, Richard C. Howard and Joseph K. H. Cheng, eds. Biographical Dictionary of Republican China. (New York: Columbia University Press, 4 Vols. 1967- ). ISBN 0231089570 (v. 3) 0231089589 (v. 4).
- Brown, Kerry et al., eds, Berkshire Dictionary of Chinese Biography, 4 volumes, Great Barrington, Massachusetts: Berkshire, 2012. ISBN 978-1-933782-66-9.
- De Crespigny, Rafe, A Biographical Dictionary of Later Han to the Three Kingdoms (23–220 AD), Brill. ISBN 978-90-04-15605-0. ISBN 90-04-15605-4. Full access available to users of The Wikipedia Library.
- Herbert Allen Giles. A Chinese Biographical Dictionary. (London, Shanghai,: B. Quaritch; Kelly & Walsh, 1898) rpr. Taipei: Chʻeng-Wen Publishing Company.
- Luther Carrington Goodrich, Fang Chao-ying, eds. Dictionary of Ming Biography, 1368–1644. (New York: Columbia University Press, 2 vols. 1976). Volume 1 ISBN 0-231-03801-1 and volume 2 ISBN 0-231-03833-X at the Internet Archive
- Arthur W. Hummel, Sr., Eminent Chinese of the Ch'ing Period. Washington, D.C. 1943.
- Donald W. Klein and Anne B. Clark, eds. Biographic Dictionary of Chinese Communism 1921–1965. (Cambridge, Mass., 2 vols. 1971).
- Leung & Leung, Political Leaders of Modern China: A Biographical Dictionary.
- Loewe, Michael, A Biographical Dictionary of the Qin, Former Han and Xin Periods (221 BC – AD 24), Leiden: Brill, 2000, ISBN 90-04-10364-3. Full access available to users of The Wikipedia Library.
- Lee Xiao Hong & A.D. Stefanowska, Biographical Dictionary of Chinese Women.
- Zhang, Wenxian & Ilan Alon, eds, Biographical Dictionary of New Chinese Entrepreneurs and Business Leaders, 2009. ISBN 1-84720-636-0. ISBN 978-1-84720-636-7.
- Zhongguo renming dacidian. 1921–present

== Czech Republic ==
- Československý biografický slovník (1 volume, 1992; contains ca 10,000 biographical articles)
- Biografický slovník českých zemí (BSČZ, 19 fascicles (A–Gn), 2004– ; complete dictionary will have ca 25,000 biographical articles)

== Denmark ==
- Engelstoft, Povl; Dahl, Svend, ed. (1979–84): Dansk biografisk leksikon (Danish Biographical Dictionary), 3rd edition in 16 volumes, Copenhagen, Gyldendal, ISBN 978-8700055513. Online access to the current updated version, is available from Gyldendal's Den Store Danske website. (in Danish)
- Larsen, Jytte (ed) (2001), Dansk kvindebiografisk leksikon (Biographical Dictionary of Danish Women), Volumes 1–3, Copenhagen, Rosinante. ISBN 9788773574874. The searchable online edition contains over 1,900 biographies from the Middle Ages to the present. (in Danish)

== Egypt ==
- David & David, A Biographical Dictionary of Ancient Egypt.
- Goldschmidt, Arthur, Biographical Dictionary of Modern Egypt.

== Finland ==
- Biografiskt lexikon för Finland, Society of Swedish Literature in Finland and Atlantis, 2008–2011. ISBN 978-951-583-166-8
- Suomen kansallisbiografia, Suomalaisen Kirjallisuuden Seura, 2003–2008. ISBN 978-951-746-441-3

== France ==
- Nouvelle Biographie Générale (1853 to 1866), 42 volumes.
- Dictionnaire de biographie des hommes célèbres de l'Alsace (1909–1910).
- Dictionnaire de biographie française (1932).
- Nouveau dictionnaire de biographie alsacienne (1982).

== German-speaking Europe ==
- Allgemeine Deutsche Biographie (1875)
- Hockerts, Hans Günter; Brantl, Markus; Ebneth, Bernhard; Jordan, Stefan: Deutsche Biographie, providing online access to over 21,000 articles from Neue Deutsche Biographie (Hockertsand, Hans Günter, ed., Berlin, Duncker & Humblor, 1953–2010, cf Vol 1, ISBN 3-428-00181-8), 26,000 articles from Allgemeine Deutsche Biographie (1912) as well as biographies from other sources. Internet access is coordinated by the Bavarian Academy of Sciences and Humanities and the Bavarian State Library. (in German)
- Neue Deutsche Biographie (1953)
- Biographisch-Bibliographisches Kirchenlexikon (1990)
- Deutsche Biographische Enzyklopädie (1995)
- Kürschners Deutscher Gelehrten-Kalender (2020)
- Munzinger-Archiv

== India ==
- Buckland, Charles Edward (1906), Dictionary of Indian Biography
  - Complete at Wikisource Dictionary of Indian Biography
  - archive.org Dictionary of Indian Biography
- Chattopadhyay, Anjana, Biographical Dictionary of Indian Scientists, Rupa, 2002. ISBN 81-7167-669-3.
- Lethbridge, Roper, The Golden Book of India: A Genealogical and Biographical Dictionary of the Ruling Princes, Chiefs, Nobles, and Other Personages, Titled or Decorated, of the Indian Empire.
- Nagar, Shantilal, Biographical Dictionary of Ancient Indian Rsis
- Rao, C. Hayavadana (ed.). "Preface" . The Indian Biographical Dictionary . Madras: Pillar & Co..
  - Complete at Wikisource.
  - Complete at Internet Archive.
  - The Indian Biographical Dictionary. University of California Libraries. 2011. ISBN 978-1-125-24065-6..
- Riddick, John, Who Was Who in British India.
- Salter, Samuel, Biographical Dictionary of South Asian Belief.
- Scholberg, Henry, Biographical Dictionary of Greater India.
- Sharma, Jagdish Saran, The National Biographical Dictionary of India, New Delhi: Sterling, 1972.
- Kulavruttanta, genealogical almanacs and biographical dictionaries, predominantly found in the Indian state of Maharashtra.
- Lilavati's Daughters, biographical dictionary of Indian women scientists.

== Ireland ==
- McGuire, James and James Quinn, Dictionary of Irish Biography. Cambridge University Press, 2009. ISBN 978-0-521-63331-4
- Mulcahy, Colm, Atlas of Irish Mathematicians.
- Ryan, Richard, Biographia Hibernica, a Biographical Dictionary of the Worthies of Ireland, from the earliest periods to the present time 2 vols, 1819–1821.

== Islamic world ==
- Al-Khatib al-Baghdad (1002–1071), History of Baghdad. Mourad, Suleiman A. (5 August 2021). Ibn 'Asakir of Damascus Champion of Sunni Islam in the Time of the Crusades. ISBN 9780861540464
- Ibn Asakir (1105–1176), History of Damascus. Steven Judd, Jens Scheiner (6 June 2017). New Perspectives on Ibn ʿAsākir in Islamic Historiography. ISBN 9789004345201
- Abu Nu'aym al-Isfahani (948–1038), Hilyat al-Awliya wa Tabaqat al-Asfiya. Josef W. Meri, ed. (2006). Medieval Islamic Civilization: An Encyclopedia Routledge ISBN 9781135455965
- Al-Hakim al-Nishapuri (933–1014), History of Nishapur. Nishaburi, Abu Abd Allah Hakim. Tarikh-i Nishabur (in Persian) (1st ed.)
- Ibn al-Athir (1160–1233), The Complete History. Francesco Gabrieli (1969), Arab Historians of the Crusades: Selected and Translated from the Arabic Sources
- ʿAbd al-Ḥayy ibn Aḥmad Ibn al-ʿImād (1623–1679), Shadharāt al-dhahab fī akhbār man dhahab. (Cairo, 1931/32)
- Beale, Thomas William & Henry George Keene, An Oriental Biographical Dictionary, Manohar Reprints, 1971.
- Bewley, Aisha, Muslim Women: A Biographical Dictionary, Ta-Ha, 2004. ISBN 1-84200-053-5.
- Dhabbī (al-), b. Umaira (d.1202/3), Bughyat al-multamis fī tārīkh rijāl ahl al-Andalus (بغية الملتمس فى تاريخ رجال اهل الاندلس ء); 'Biographic Encyclopedia of Arab Spain' (ed. Codera, F.; Ribera, J.; Biblio. Arabico-Hispana, 1884)
- Frank, Allen, An Islamic Biographical Dictionary of the Eastern Kazakh Steppe 1770–1912, Brill, 2004. ISBN 90-04-14127-8
- Iṣbahānī (al-), Abū al-Faraj (897–967), Kitāb al-Aghanī (كتاب الأغاني); 'Book of Songs' 21 vols. (Cairo, Būlāq Press, 1868).
- Jenkins, Who's Who in Islam: A Biographical Dictionary of Persons and Groups from the Time of Muhammad to the Present, McFarland, 2007. ISBN 978-0-7864-2376-7.
- Kaḥḥālah, ‘Umar Riḍā (1905–1987), Mu'jam al-Mu'allifin (معجم المؤلفين); Damascus, 1961 [1957] 4 vol., biographical-bibliographical dictionary.
- Kâtip Çelebi (1609–1657), Kaşf az-Zunūn ‘an 'asāmī ‘l-Kutub wa-l’fanūn (كشف الظنون عن أسامي الكتب والفنون) ‘Opinion's Scrutiny of the Names of Books and the Sciences’ (1652).
  - Lexicon Bibliographicum et Encyclopaedicum (Kashf az-Zunun Arabic-Latin parallel text; tr., ed., Gustav Flügel, The Oriental Translation Fund of Gt. Brit. & Ireland (Vol.1; Leipzig, 1835), (Vol.2; Leipzig, 1837), (Vol.3; London, 1842), (Vol.4; London, 1845), (Vol.5; London, 1850), (Vol.6; London, 1852).
- Khallikān (ibn) (1211–1282), Deaths of Eminent Men and the Sons of the Epoch (وفيات الأعيان وأنباء أبناء الزمان); 'Wafayāt al-aʿyān wa-anbāʾ abnāʾ az-zamān' (1256–1274).
- Khan, Mohammed Ishaq, Biographical Dictionary of Sufism, 2009. ISBN 978-81-7304-681-0.
- Leaman, Oliver, Biographical Encyclopedia of Islamic Philosophy.
- Nawawī (al-) (1233–1277), Tahdhib al-Asma wa'l-Lughat (تهذيب الأسماء); 'Illustrious Men chiefly at the Beginning of Islam' (ed., F. Wüstenfeld, Göttingen, 1842–1847)
- Salah al-Dīn al-Ṣafadī (1296–1363),
  - Kitab al-Wafi bi'l-Wafayat (كتاب الوافي بالوفيات) 'Notable people.'
  - Nakt al-Humyān fī Nukat al-Umyān,(نَكْت الهميان في نُكَتِ العميان) 'Blind notable people.'
- Suyūṭī (al-) (1455–1505), Bughyat al-wuʻāh fī ṭabaqāt al-lughawīyīn wa-al-nuḥāh (بغية الوعاة، في طبقات اللغويين والنحاة); 'Eminent lexicographers and grammarians'; (Cairo, Maṭbaʻat al-Saʻādah,1908)
- Qiftī (al-) (ca. 1172–1248), Kitāb Ikhbār al-‘Ulamā’ bi Akhbār al-Ḥukamā (abbr., Ta’rīkh al-Ḥukamā’. ed., Julius Lippert, Leipzig, Theodor Weicher, 1903)

== Italy ==
- Dizionario Biografico degli Italiani (1925)
- Enciclopedia Biografica Universale

== Japan ==
- Bingenheimer, Marcus, A Biographical Dictionary of the Japanese Student-Monks of the Seventh and Early Eighth Centuries, 2001. ISBN 978-3-89129-693-6.
- Hisamatsu, Sen'ichi, Biographical Dictionary of Japanese Literature, Kodansha International Ltd. in collaboration with the International Society for Educational Information, 1976. ISBN 0 87011 253 8.
- Iwao, Seiichi (supervising editor) & Watson, Burton (trans.), Biographical Dictionary of Japanese History, Kodansha International Ltd. in collaboration with the International Society for Educational Information, 1978. ISBN 0 87011 274 0.

== Mexico ==
- Biographical Dictionary of Mexican Film Performers

== Native North American ==
- Bataille, Gretchen & Laurie Lisa, eds, Native American Women: A Biographical Dictionary.
- Irvine, Biographical Dictionary of Indians of the Americas, 1990.
- Bruce E. Johansen, Native Americans Today: A Biographical Dictionary, Santa Barbara, California: Greenwood.
- Waldman, Carl, Biographical Dictionary of American Indian History to 1900, 2001. ISBN 0-8160-4253-5.

== Netherlands ==
- Nieuw Nederlandsch Biografisch Woordenboek (1911–1937)
- Biografisch Woordenboek van Nederland (1979–2009)
- 1001 Vrouwen uit de Nederlandse geschiedenis (2013)

== New Zealand ==
- Dictionary of New Zealand Biography

== Norway ==
- Hvem er hvem?
- Arntzen, Jon Gunnar, ed. (2009). Norsk biografisk leksikon (Norwegian Biographical Dictionary). Oslo: Kunnskapsforlaget. The print edition (1985) in 19 volumes contains 5,100 articles. ISBN 978-82-573-0734-9. The searchable online edition is a component of the Store norske leksikon. (in Norwegian)

== Pakistan ==
- Biographical Encyclopedia of Pakistan

== Poland ==
- Regis, saneti, bellatores, scriptores Poloni – Krzysztof Warszewicki; 1601
- Scriptorum Polonicorum Hekatontas seu centrum illustrum Poloniae scriptorum elogia et vitae – Szymon Starowolski; 1625
- Laudatio Almae Aedemiae Cracoviensis – Szymon Starowolski; 1628
- Polonia litterata nostri temporis – Jan Daniel Janocki; 1750
- Polski słownik biograficzny – ed. Władysław Konopczyński, Kazimierz Lepszy, Emanuel Rostworowski, Henryk Markiewicz, Andrzej Romanowski; 48 volumes, 1935-(2015)
- Słownik biograficzny ziemi cieszyńskiej – Józef Golec & Stefania Bojda; 4 volumes, 1993, 1995, 1998, 2014
- Słownik pisarzy polskich – Tadeusz Słabczyński; 2001
- Słownik biograficzny Pomorza Nadwiślańskiego – Gdańsk 1992
- Słownik biograficzny powiatu toruńskiego – Lubicz 2010
- Słownik biograficzny XX wieku – Michał Czajka; 2004

== Russia & Soviet Union ==
- Parrish, Michael, Soviet Security and Intelligence Organizations 1917–1990
- Pierce, Richard A., Russian America, 1741–1867, A Biographical Dictionary

== Slovenia ==
- Slovenski biografski leksikon (Dictionary of Slovene National Biography, set of 16 volumes); at first Zadružna gospodarska banka, later on Slovenska akademija znanosti in umetnosti, 1925–1991. From December 2013 a new edition on Portal Slovenska biografija free searchable. (in Slovene)
- Bajt, Drago (1999), Slovenski kdo je kdo (Slovenian Who is Who), Ljubljana, Nova revija. (in Slovene) ISBN 961-6017-90-X

== Spain ==
- Real Academía de la Historia (2011), Diccionario Biográfico Español (Spanish Biographical Dictionary). ISBN 978-84-96849-56-3 (set of 20 volumes). (in Spanish)

== Sweden ==
- Karlsson, Åsa, ed. (2010) Svenskt biografiskt lexikon (Dictionary of Swedish National Biography), Stockholm, Riksarkivet. First published in 1917 (volume 1), today there are 33 volumes containing some 14,000 articles. Free searchable online access is available from Riksarkivet. (in Swedish)
- Svenskt författarlexikon (Dictionary of Swedish Authors), biobibliographical dictionary of Swedish-language authors published in ten volumes.
- Svenskt kvinnobiografiskt lexikon (Biographical Dictionary of Swedish Women), under development by KvinnSam, free, searchable web-based biographical dictionary in Swedish and English, 2018
- Vem är det with the subtitle Svensk biografisk handbok (Swedish Biographical Handbook), has been published in 46 editions since 1912. Several of the editions are available in free online access from runeberg.org (in Swedish)

== Switzerland ==
- Fondation DHS, ed. (2011) Dictionnaire Historique de la Suisse (Historical Dictionary of Switzerland), Editions Gilles Attinger, Hauterive, ISBN 2-88256-133-4. (in French) Also published in German as Historisches Lexikon der Schweiz, Schwabe AG, Basel, ISBN 3-7965-1900-8 (in German) and Italian as Dizionario storico della Svizzera, Armando Dadò editore, Locarno, ISBN 88-8281-100-X. (in Italian). The work currently consists of 10 volumes (A-Sa) in each language and is expected to be completed in 2014 with the 13th volume. Free searchable online access is available. The work contains a large number of biographies.

== Tibet ==
- Khetsun Sangpo, bod du sgrub brgyad shing rta mched brgyad las (Biographical Dictionary of Tibet and Tibetan Buddhism), Dharmsala, Himachal Pradesh: Library of Tibetan Works and Archives, 12 volumes, 1973–1990.

== United Kingdom ==
- A Biographical Dictionary of Civil Engineers.
- Boase, Frederic, Modern English Biography. First Edition. 1892–1921. 6 volumes. Second Impression. Frank Cass & Co. Ltd. 1965.
- British Biographical Index.
- Chambers Biographical Dictionary.
- Concise Dictionary of National Biography.
- Crawford et al., eds, The Europa Biographical Dictionary of British Women. Europa Publications Limited. 1983. ISBN 0 905118 77 4.
- Darby, Michael, A Biographical Dictionary of British Coleopterists, The Coleopterist.
- Dictionary of British Sculptors 1660–1851 (later A Biographical Dictionary of Sculptors in Britain 1660–1851), 3 edns, 1951, 1968 (both by Rupert Forbes Gunnis) and 2009 (by Ingrid Roscoe)
- A Dictionary of Edwardian Biography. Reprint. Edinburgh. 1983 onwards. 36 vols.
- Dictionary of National Biography.
- Dictionary of Welsh Biography.
- Eccleshall, Robert & Graham Walker, eds, Biographical Dictionary of British Prime Ministers.
- Ewan, Reynolds, Innes, Pipes, Biographical Dictionary of Scottish Women.
- Gardner, Juliet, ed, The History Today Who's Who in British History. Collins & Brown Limited. Cima Books. 2000. ISBN 1 85585 771 5.
- Gillow, Joseph. A Literary and Biographical History, or Biographical Dictionary of the English Catholics. From the Breach with Rome, in 1534, to the Present Time. Burns and Oates. London: Granville Mansions, 28 Orchard Street, W. New York: Catholic Publication Society Co. 9 Barclay Street. Preface is dated June 1885. 5 volumes.
- Gorton's Biographical Dictionary
- Greaves, Richard L & Robert Zaller, eds, Biographical Dictionary of British Radicals in the Seventeenth Century. The Harvester Press. Vol 1. 1982. ISBN 0 85527 133 7. Vol 2. 1983. ISBN 0 7108 0430 X. Vol 3. 1984. ISBN 0 7108 0486 5.
- Harrison, Cy, Royal Navy Officers of the Seven Years War: A Biographical Dictionary of Commissioned Officers 1748–1763. Helion & Company Ltd. 2019. ISBN 978-1-912866-68-7
- The History of Parliament (1940 onwards), incorporating a prosopographical history of the English (later British) parliament
- Laybourn, Keith, British Political Leaders: A Biographical Dictionary.
- Munk's Roll, or The Roll of the Royal College of Physicians of London, published between 1861 and the present day. First edited by William Munk
- New and General Biographical Dictionary (1761), became Chalmers' Biographical Dictionary (1812)
- Oxford Dictionary of National Biography.
- Plarr's Lives of the Fellows or Lives of the Fellows of the Royal College of Surgeons, originally by Victor Plarr (first volume 1897) but continued by others to the present day
- Stewart, William, British and Irish Poets: A Biographical Dictionary 449–2006.
- Who's Who, published by A & C Black.
- Who's Who in Catholic Life, Gabriel Communications, publishers of The Universe and the Catholic Times.

== United States ==
- African American National Biography Project
- American Council of Learned Societies, Dictionary of American Biography, New York: Scribner. ISBN 0-684-80631-2. OCLC 4171403.
- American National Biography
- Appleton's Cyclopedia of American Biography
- Asimov, Isaac, Biographical Encyclopedia of Science and Technology.
- Biographical Dictionary of American Architects.
- Biographical Dictionary of American Labor.
- Biographical Directory of the United States Congress
- Blake's Biographical Dictionary
- Bowling, Lawson, Shapers of the Great Debate on the Great Society: A Biographical Dictionary.
- Calarco, Tom, People of the Underground Railroad: A Biographical Dictionary.
- Cosner & Scanlon, American Women Historians, 1700s–1990s: A Biographical Dictionary.
- Dictionary of Cleveland Biography.
- Encyclopedia of American Biography
- Johnson, Rossiter; Brown, John Howard, eds. The Biographical Dictionary of America, 1904.
- Hall, Timothy, Supreme Court Justices: A Biographical Dictionary.
- Hamilton, Neil & Ian Friedman, Presidents: A Biographical Dictionary.
- Hannings, Bud, American Revolutionary War Leaders: A Biographical Dictionary.
- Hischak, Thomas, Disney Voice Actors: A Biographical Dictionary.
- Homans, James, The Cyclopædia of American Biography, 1918.
- Hudson, Bergman, Horton, Biographical Dictionary of Iowa, University of Iowa.
- Katz & Vencill, Biographical Dictionary of the United States Secretaries of the Treasury, 1789–1995.
- Kim, Cordova, Fugita, Ng, Singh, eds, Distinguished Asian Americans: A Biographical Dictionary, Westport, Connecticut: Greenwood, 1999.
- Kranz, Rachel, The Biographical Dictionary of Black Americans.
- Kranz, Rachel & Philip Koslow, The Biographical Dictionary of African Americans.
- Mather, Frank Lincoln, Who's Who of the Colored Race: a general biographical dictionary of men and women of African descent, Chicago: 1915; 1976.
- McCartney, Martha, Virginia Immigrants and Adventurers, 1607–1635: A Biographical Dictionary
- Melton, John Gordon, Biographical Dictionary of American Cult and Sect Leaders, New York/London: Garland, 1986.
- Moses, John, Biographical Dictionary and Portrait Gallery of the Representative Men of the United States.
- Nadell, Pamela, Conservative Judaism in America: A Biographical Dictionary and Sourcebook.
- New Jersey Biographical Dictionary.
- Newman, Roger, ed, The Yale Biographical Dictionary of American Law, Yale University Press.
- New Perspectives on the West: People,
- Nolan, Cathal, Notable U.S. Ambassadors Since 1775: A Biographical Dictionary.
- Notable American Women, 1607–1950; a Biographical Dictionary. Harvard University Press.
- Ohles, Frederik, Shirley Ohles, and John Ramsay, Biographical Dictionary of Modern American Educators, 1997.
- Olitzky, Kerry, Lance Sussman, and Malcolm Stern, Reform Judaism in America: A Biographical Dictionary and Sourcebook. ISBN 0-313-24628-9. ISBN 978-0-313-24628-9.
- Porter, David, ed, Basketball: A Biographical Dictionary, Greenwood Press, 2005. ISBN 0-313-30952-3
- Porter, David, Latino and African American Athletes Today: A Biographical Dictionary.
- Samuels, Peggy, The Illustrated Biographical Encyclopedia of Artists of the American West, Doubleday.
- Schneider & Schneider, First Ladies: A Biographical Dictionary.
- Raphael, Marc & Moshe D. Sherman, Orthodox Judaism in America: A Biographical Dictionary and Sourcebook. partially accessible at Google Books
- Skipper, John, A Biographical Dictionary of the Baseball Hall of Fame.
- Smith, Jessie Carney, Notable Black American Women.
- The United States Biographical Dictionary and Portrait Gallery of Eminent and Self-made Men, Chicago & New York: American Biographical Publishing Company, 1878.
- Wilson, Dreck Spurlock, African American Architects: A Biographical Dictionary, 1865–1945.
- Who's Who in America, published by Marquis Who's Who
- Who's Who in Nebraska (1940)
