= Izzeddin Hasanoghlu =

Sheikh Izzeddin Esfarayeni
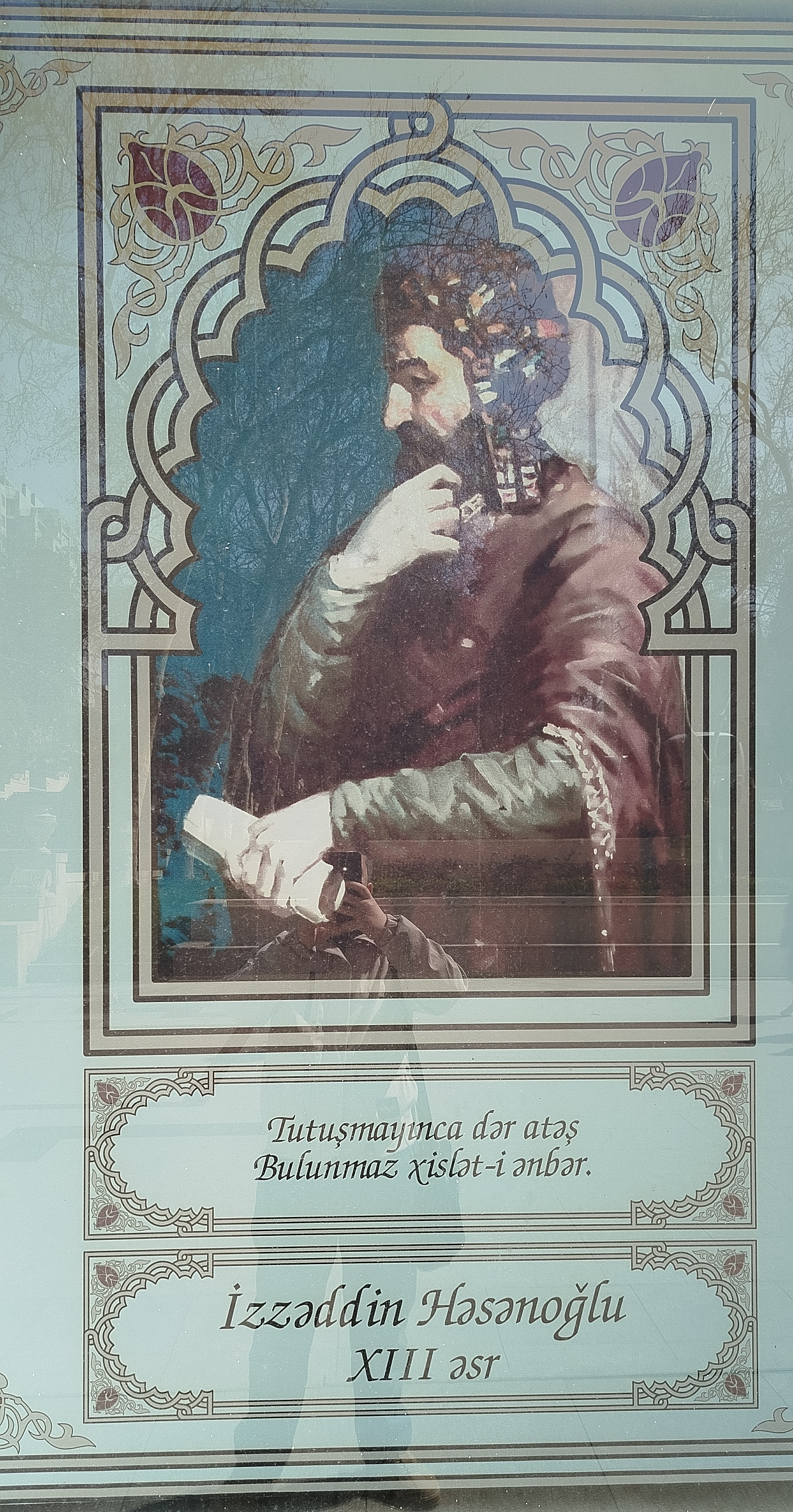
- Depiction of Hasanoghlu in the Nizami Museum of Azerbaijan Literature in Baku
- Born: 13th century Esfarayen, Khorasan (Modern-day Iran)
- Died: 14th century
- Occupation: Poet
- Writing career
- Pen name: Hasanoghlu, Pur-e Hasan
- Language: Azerbaijani, Persian

Sheikh Izzeddin Esfarayeni (Azerbaijani: عزالدین حسن‌ اوغلو; Persian: شیخ عزالدین پورحسن اسفراینی), who wrote under the pseudonyms of Hasanoghlu and Pur-e Hasan, was a 13th and 14th century poet who wrote in Azerbaijani and Persian. He is the earliest known author of Azerbaijani literature.

Hasanoghlu was born in Esfarayen in the 13th century. He was a student of Sheikh Jamaladdin Ahmed Zakir, the head of one of the Sufi sects. During his lifetime, Hasanoghlu was well-known, with his fame reaching as far as Anatolia. His lyrics influenced many generations of Turkic-language poets. Hasanoghlu primarily composed lyric poems about love that were infused with Sufi ideology. He composed a diwan of Azerbaijani and Persian ghazals. Only three of Hasanoghlu's poems have survived.

== Life ==
There is insufficient information about the life of Izzeddin Hasanoghlu in medieval sources. The Turkish scholar M. Fuat Köprülü was the first to introduce him to the modern academic and literary community and to provide information about him. According to Köprülü’s article Notes on Azerbaijani Literature: Hasanoghlu-Habib (Âzârî Edebiyatına Dair Notlar: Hasan Oğlu-Habîb), the poet, who was from the Turks of Esfarayen, was a disciple of Sheikh Jamal al-Din Ahmad Zakir, himself a caliph of Sheikh Radi al-Din Ali Lala. Based on this, it is assumed that Izzeddin Hasanoghlu lived during the first half of the 13th century. The 14th-century Tatar-Qipchaq poet Sayfi Sarayi (1321–1396) composed a poetic response (nazire) to Sheikh Izzeddin’s ghazal SSShe Took Away My Heart... (Apardı könlümü…). Both the ghazal and the response were appended to Sarayi’s Turkish translation of Saadi Shirazi’s Gulistan. This suggests that Hasanoghlu was either a contemporary of Sarayi or lived before him. Turkish scholars such as M. Fuat Köprülü, I. Hikmet, N. S. Banarlı, and others also accept that the poet lived in the late 13th and early 14th centuries.

The earliest reference to Hasanoghlu in medieval sources appears in the 15th century. In his biographical work Memoirs of the Poets (Tazkirat al-Shu‘ara’), completed in 1487, Dowlatshah Samarqandi, the son of Amir Ala al-Dawla-i Esfarayeni, tutor of the Timurid ruler Shahrukh Mirza, writes about Izzeddin Hasanoghlu as follows:

“He was a wise, believer, devoted, and santon person, a disciple of Sheikh Jamal al-Din Ahmad Zakir, who was one of the caliphs of Sheikh Razi al-Haqq wa al-Din Ali ibn Sa‘id Lala. His divan is also well known in Azerbaijan, and he is a famous Sufi poet... He used the pen name Hasanoghlu in Turkish, and Purhasan in Persian.”

Samarqandi refers to Hasanoghlu with the nisba “Esfarayeni.” Esfarayen is an ancient settlement located at the foot of Mount Jahan, north of the Hirdah Mountains, in the province of Khorasan. Historical sources—including Mujmal al-Tawarikh wa al-Qisas, Lubab al-Abwab, Tarikh-i Jahangusha, Qamus al-‘Ulama’, Rayhanat al-Adab, and others—indicate that Esfarayen has produced many prominent figures, scholars, mystics, virtuous individuals, and statesmen, and that Turks and Persians have long lived together in this region.

Hasanoghlu died and was buried in his native Esfarayen. His grave has been destroyed multiple times. On this subject, Seyfeddin Altayli, in his article Some Shared Motifs from Turkic Mythology in the Poems of Izzeddin Hasanoghlu and Six Balkan Poets (İzzeddin Həsənoğlu ve Altı Balkan Şairinin Şiirlerinde Türk Mitolojisine Ait Bazı Ortak Motifler), writes:

“Hasanoghlu’s grave, which was located on a hill leaning against Mount Shah Jahan along the road to Esfarayen, has collapsed. Although friends in the region made contact and carried out certain necessary efforts to erect a suitable grave in his honor, the tomb of this Sufi poet—whose legacy had the potential to strengthen national identity among the people—was destroyed by chauvinistic-minded individuals within the geography of Iran.”

== Works ==
As previously noted, it is known that Fuat Köprülü was the first to introduce Izzeddin Hasanoghlu into the history of Azerbaijani literature. All researchers have mentioned that he composed two poems in Turkish and two in Persian. Fuat Köprülü discovered and published three Turkish poems attributed to him.

The poet, who used the pen name Hasanoghlu in his Turkish poems and Purhasan in his Persian works, is recognized as the author of the first ghazal written in the Azerbaijani vernacular—SShe Took Away My Heart... (Apardı könlümü…). This seven-bayt ghazal, brought to light by M. Fuat Köprülü with the close assistance of the European orientalist Kramers, was appended to Sayfi Sarayi’s Turkish translation of Saadi Shirazi’s Gulistan. The poetic form of the ghazal (an internal dialogue) belongs to an older structure of classical Eastern poetry known as radd al-‘ajz, more accurately radd al-‘ajz ‘ala al-sadr, which means “repetition or negation of the opening in the closing.” The ghazal is composed in the hazaj meter of classical aruz, following the repeated prosodic foot mafā‘īlun four times per line.

The ghazal by I. Hasanoghlu discussed here is written in a lyrical and romantic mode. However, in several recent scholarly works, it has also been interpreted as a Sufi poem. For example, in her monographic study Sufism in Azerbaijani Poetry from the 12th to the 16th Century (XII-XVI əsrlər Azərbaycan şeirində təsəvvüf), Kh. Hummatova writes: “The ghazal SShe Took Away My Heart... reflects the poet’s Sufi views in terms of semantic content.” On the same poem, A. Rustamova notes: “Hasanoghlu’s ghazal SShe Took Away My Heart... testifies to his poetic talent and his ability to compose accomplished works in Azeri Turkish. The poem is a perfect example of the ghazal genre, in which divine love is symbolically embodied through a complex form that requires an expressive capacity developed over centuries.”

The use of symbols such as dilbar (beloved), dilbari shahid (martyr-like beloved), shahidi sarvar (noble witness), but (idol), surahi (flagon), bada (glass of wine), and others are characteristic of classical poetry. Additionally, terms like beloved, sultan, mahbub (lover), wine, mouth and smiling bud (gonche-yi-khandan) serve as poetic imagery.

In the ghazal, Arabic and Persian words and expressions are skillfully adapted to the syntactic structure and sentence patterns of the Azerbaijani language. Phrases such as “SShe Took away my heart…”, “She never left my mind”, “She was written within my soul”, etc., reflect the simplicity and vitality of the spoken vernacular. After Hasanoghlu, numerous poetic responses (nazire) were composed in both Turkish and Persian to SShe Took Away My Heart.... Among those who composed responses in Turkish are Sayfi Sarayi, the 15th-century Anatolian poet Ahmad Dā’ī, Azerbaijani authors such as Mohnati Baku’i (14th century), Nabi of Shaki (18th century), Salih of Shirvan (18th century), and Abdulkhaliq Jannati (1855–1931), among others. In Persian, responses were written by the poet known by the pen name “Ima”, by Tufayli (15th–16th centuries), Bidil, who lived in 17th-century India, and others.

The Ghazal with the Radif “Bənim”

The second known Turkish-language ghazal by Izzaddin Hasanoghlu begins with the line Necəsən, gəl ey yüzü ağum bənüm (“How are you, come, O my bright-faced one”). This poem was discovered by the German orientalist and professor at the University of Hamburg, Barbara Flemming, who presented it to the academic public in her paper Unknown Poems in the Divan of Sultan Qavri (Sultan Gavri Divanında Naməlum Şiirlər), delivered at the First Turkish Language Scientific Congress held in Turkey on 27–29 September 1972.

Subsequently, Azerbaijani scholar Farhad Zeynalov provided further information on the ghazal discovered by B. Flemming in a brief article entitled A New Azerbaijani Poem by Hasanoghlu, published in the Literature and Art (Ədəbiyyat və incəsənət) newspaper on 25 November 1972. He also included the full text of the poem for readers.

Like She Took Away My Heart... (Apardı könlümü…), this ghazal also centers on the theme of love. In the opening bayt, the poetic persona addresses the beloved, longs for their arrival, and expresses that due to love, the lover’s body has melted as if consumed by fiery oils.

Compared to She Took Away My Heart..., the language of Necəsən, gəl… is simpler. One reason is that the first ghazal features a poetic structure and style emphasizing subject-attribute relationships, leading to the construction of all second lines in the bayts around izafet combinations. This poetic technique results in a certain linguistic complexity. The relatively intricate second lines, with their high number of loanwords, can be attributed to this stylistic choice.

In a 2013 article titled A Majmua Containing Several Poems from the 14th–16th Centuries and the Poems of Ibn-i Ömer (XIV–XVI. Yüzyıllar Arasında Yazılmış Bazı Şiirleri İhtiva Eden Bir Mecmua ve İbn-i Ömer’in Şiirleri), Turkish scholar Ersen Ersoy notes that a manuscript preserved at the National Library in Paris contains several poems by various authors, including the very ghazal by I. Hasanoghlu previously identified by B. Flemming. According to Ersoy, the version in the Paris manuscript includes several additional bayts not found in Flemming’s version.

The third known Turkish ghazal by Izzaddin Hasanoghlu is the Kim radif ghazal.

This poem, composed around a rhetorical question, is described as a concise and meaningful tawhid-nama (poem of divine unity). It is written in a fluent, expressive, and accessible language.

The Kitabi-Sirat al-Nabi Masnavi

This work was acquired in 2009 by Ilhan Shimshek from a private collector in Finland, brought to Turkey, and deposited at the Turkish Language Association, where it was cataloged in the library under the reference number “manuscript 766, 15/2554.” The manuscript measures 17×23.5–12×18 cm and comprises 366 folios. It is written on European watermarked paper in vocalized naskh script. The presence of diacritical marks strengthens the belief that the original copy also included vocalization. The original version of the masnavi has not been found. The poem contains 12,390 bayts. Chapter headings and Qur’anic verses are written in red ink.

The Kitabi-Sirat al-Nabi (The Book of the Life of the Prophet) is a religious-literary masnavi dedicated to the Prophet Muhammad. Its language is that of 13th-century Azerbaijani Turkish. The extant copy was transcribed and prepared in Istanbul on 17 Safar 1217 AH (1802 CE). The poem’s narrative is derived from Sirat al-Nabi by Abu al-Hasan al-Bakri al-Qassasi. Hasanoghlu introduces several bayts with the phrase “Abu al-Hasan Bakri narrates that…”. In the khatima (conclusion), the author signs the work by writing: “Hasanoghlu at the threshold of this service, his face became dust; al-hamdu li-Llah.”

The masnavi includes the following chapters:

- Aghazi qisse-i veladeti Seyyidil Mürselin ve Khatemi Nebiyyin ve Habibi Rabbil Alemin
- Qisse-i Resul Hezretinin mübarek gözleri aghriyub kendü aghiz yari shefa oldughi qissedir
- Qisse-i kishteni giriftani Mustafa be Ebu Cehl leyni-bi-vefa
- Qisse-i muhacereti Mustafa berayi Khedice el Kübra radiallahu anha
- Qisse veladet Emirül Mömineen ve Imami el Muttaqin Imam Eli kerramallahu vechhe
- Qisse-i amiden vahyi Peyghember sallallahu aleyhi ve sellem
- Qisse-i müselman shidden Ebu Bekr ve Osman ibn Affan radiallahu anhuma
- Zikri Islam Ömer radiallahu anha
- Zikri mirac Resulullah sallallahu aleyhi ve sellem
- Zikr qisse-i inshiqaqi kemer ve Habib müselman oldughi
- Qisse-i arze kerden Resulullah khud ra ber kebaili Ereb
- Zikri ta Peyghemberin kaftani olan Yehudi Tayan qissəsidir
- Qisse-i hicret Peyghember sallallahu aleyhi ve sellem
- Qisse-i Miqdad-i ibn Esved el Kendi ba siyase dehder hebbe birin mezahim
- Zikri qeza-i Bedir ba küffari Qureysh ve helak shoden-i Ebu Cehl-i lein
- Zikri qeza-i Uhud ve shehid shodeni Hamze pehlevan radiallahu anha
- Zikri qisse-i qezai Kheyber
- Zikri qezaye Beni Qureyza Shah-i Merdan manciligha qoyub qalaya atdiqlari qissedir
- Emirül Mömineen Ebu Bekrin oghlu Abdurrahman müselman oldughi qissedir
- Tanri qilici Khalid ibn-i Velid müselman oldughi ve Tanri düshmeni Velid ibn-i Mughire ile cengi qissəsidir
- Qurab qalasinin alindighi qeza ve andaghi ecayibler ve Zatil Nevar aghacin kesdikleri ve Shah-i Merdanun cengi qissəsidir
- Mirkal ibn-i Fasahül-Ebtal qezasinin qissesidir ve Shahin ulu cengidur
- Zatil-Ebatilde Esed ve Qeys lein ile olan ceng qissesidir ve Tuqun qiz ile olan qezasidir
- Mekkenin Sherafallahu Teala feth oldughu qezadur bu qisse

This work belongs to the tradition of jang-namas (war epics) from the early Islamic period and corresponds to the era in which such narratives began to appear in Turkic literature. At the time, these works served two purposes: first, to assist the Turkic people in adopting Islam during ongoing wars; second, to promote the spirit of conquest within Turkic society. In many parts of the poem, one sees the stylistic influence of the Dede Qorqud epics and early religious-legendary masnavis.

Some episodes in the work take on the character of independent stories, such as:

- The Story of Miqdad ibn Aswad al-Kindi and the Siege with Hazelnut Seeds
- The Story of the Battle of Khaybar
- The Story of the Battle of Banu Qurayza

A linguistically important point in the masnavi is that the language throughout closely reflects the dialect still spoken in Southern Azerbaijan today, and even resembles speech patterns found in rural villages around Baku. Despite the long-term prohibition on written literature in Southern Azerbaijan, the people preserved their language through oral literature, transmitting it intact from mythological times to the present. Based on this, it is assumed that although Izzaddin Hasanoghlu was born in the Khorasan region, he likely lived in Southern Azerbaijan, particularly in the Tabriz area, where he acquired and used the local Turkish dialect.

The poet’s use of words like qoxuva, bərivə, and yuxarıva, typical of the Tabriz dialect, supports this assumption.

The presence of cosmic concepts and mythological expressions throughout the work suggests that during Hasanoghlu’s time, ancient Turkic beliefs in the Sky God (Gök Tanrı) and the celestial realm continued within the framework of the newly adopted Islamic faith.

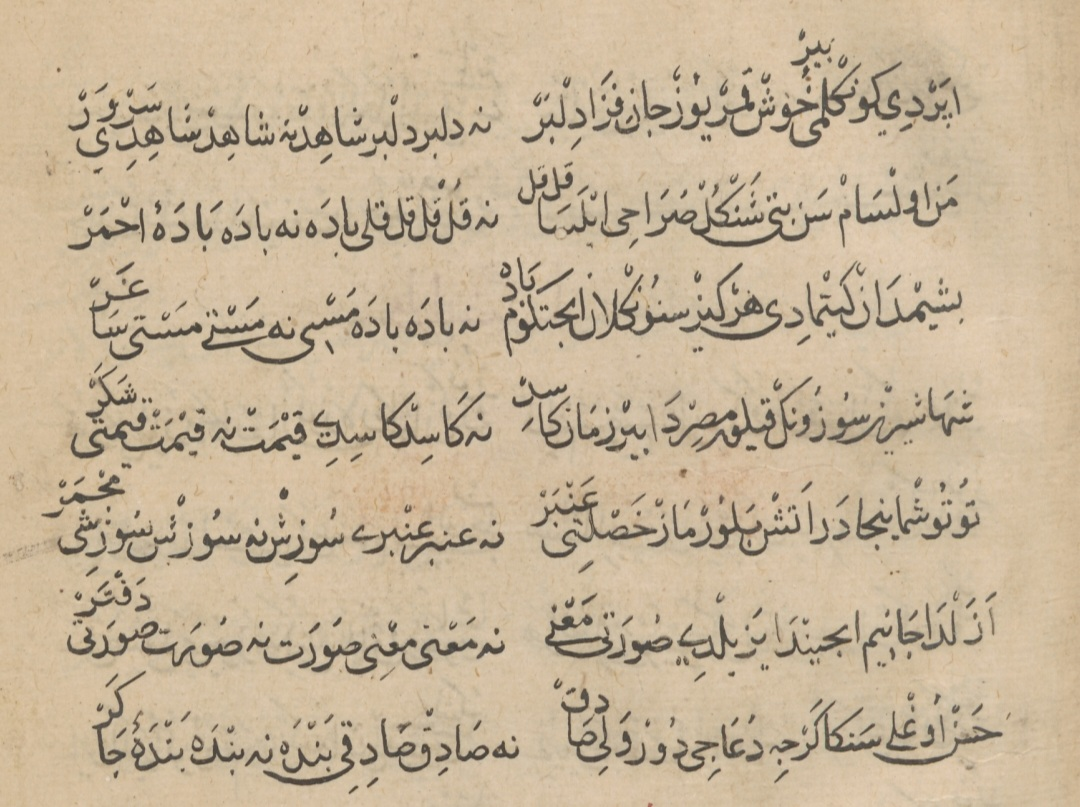
Ghazal commonly called "Apardı könlümü" by Hasanoghlu which is considered the earliest known piece of literature in Azerbaijani language from the 14th century manuscript Or. 1553 "Kitab-i Gulistan bil-Turki; and other texts" compiled by Seyfi Sarayi kept in the library of Leiden University

== Literature ==
- Javadi, H.; Burrill, K. (1988). "AZERBAIJAN x. Azeri Turkish Literature". In Yarshater, Ehsan (ed.). Encyclopædia Iranica. Vol. III/3: Azerbaijan IV–Bačča(-ye) Saqqā. London and New York: Routledge & Kegan Paul. pp. 251–255. ISBN 978-0-71009-115-4.
- Caferoǧlu, A. (2012). "Ād̲h̲arī (Azerī)". In Fleet, Kate; Krämer, Gudrun; Matringe, Denis; Nawas, John; Rowson, Everett (eds.). Encyclopaedia of Islam (3rd ed.). Brill Online. ISSN 1873-9830.
- Heß, Michael R (2015). "Azerbaijani literature". In Fleet, Kate; Krämer, Gudrun; Matringe, Denis; Nawas, John; Rowson, Everett (eds.). Encyclopaedia of Islam (3rd ed.). Brill Online. ISSN 1873-9830.
- Gasimova, Aida (2015). "Qurʾānic Symbolism of the Eyes in Classical Azeri Turkic Poetry". Oriens. 43 (1/2): 101–153. doi:10.1163/18778372-04301005. ISSN 0078-6527.
- "Гасаноглы Иззеддин" [Hasanoghlu Izzeddin]. Great Soviet Encyclopaedia (in Russian). Vol. 1. 1960.
- Karayev, Y. (1964). "ГАСАНОГЛЫ́" [HASANOGHLU]. Concise Literary Encyclopedia (in Russian). Vol. 2. Moscow. p. 81.
- Beale, Thomas William; Keene, Henry George (1894). An Oriental Biographical Dictionary. W.H. Allen.
- Flemming, Barbara (2018). Essays on Turkish Literature and History. Brill.
- Əliyev, Məmməd (2017-09-13). İlk anadilli qəzəlimiz (in Azerbaijani). 525-ci qəzet. p. 8.
- Babayev, Y. M. (2009). XIII-XIV əsrlər ana dilli lirik şeirimizin inkişaf yolu (in Azerbaijani). Bakı: "Elm və təhsil" NPM. p. 256.
- Ercan, Özlem (2017). "Azeri Şair Hasanoğlu'nun Bir Gazeline Ahmedî ve Ahmed-i Dâ'î Tarafından Yazılmış Nazireler". Turkish Studies (Elektronik) (in Turkish). 12: 177–192.
- Həşimli, Hüseyn (2016). "İzzəddin Həsənoğlunun bir qəzəli haqqında". Naxçıvan Dövlət Universiteti. Qeyrət nəşriyyat (in Azerbaijani). 4. Naxçıvan: 3–9.
- Həşimli, Hüseyn (8 February 2018). "Şeyx İzzəddin Həsənoğlunun bir qəzəli haqqında" [About a Ghazal by Izzeddin Hasanoglu]. Ədəbiyyat qazeti (in Azerbaijani).
- Altaylı, Seyfəddin (2021). "Mitolojiden İzzeddin Hasanoğlu'na Gök Arketipi". Milli Folklor Dergisi (in Turkish). 17: 72–89.
- Altaylı, Seyfəddin (2023a). İzzeddin Hasanoğlu ve Altı Balkan Şairinin Şiirlerinde Türk Mitolojisine Ait Bazı Ortak Motifler (in Turkish). Vol. 5. Balkanlarda Türk Dili ve Edebiyatı Araştırmaları. pp. 181–203.
- Altaylı, Seyfəddin (2023b). "İzzeddin Hasanoğlu'nun "Kitab-ı Siretü'n Nebî" Mesnevisinde Hz. Ali Cenknamelerinin İzleri". Karadeniz Araştırmaları (in Turkish). XX: 237–258.
