= General Biographical Dictionary =

General Biographical Dictionary may refer to:

- Alexander Chalmers' General Biographical Dictionary
- John Gorton's General Biographical Dictionary
- John Lauris Blake's General Biographical Dictionary
- General Biographical Dictionary or General Biography of John Aikin
- New General Biographical Dictionary of Hugh James Rose
