= Johannes van der Aeck =

Dutch Golden Age painter

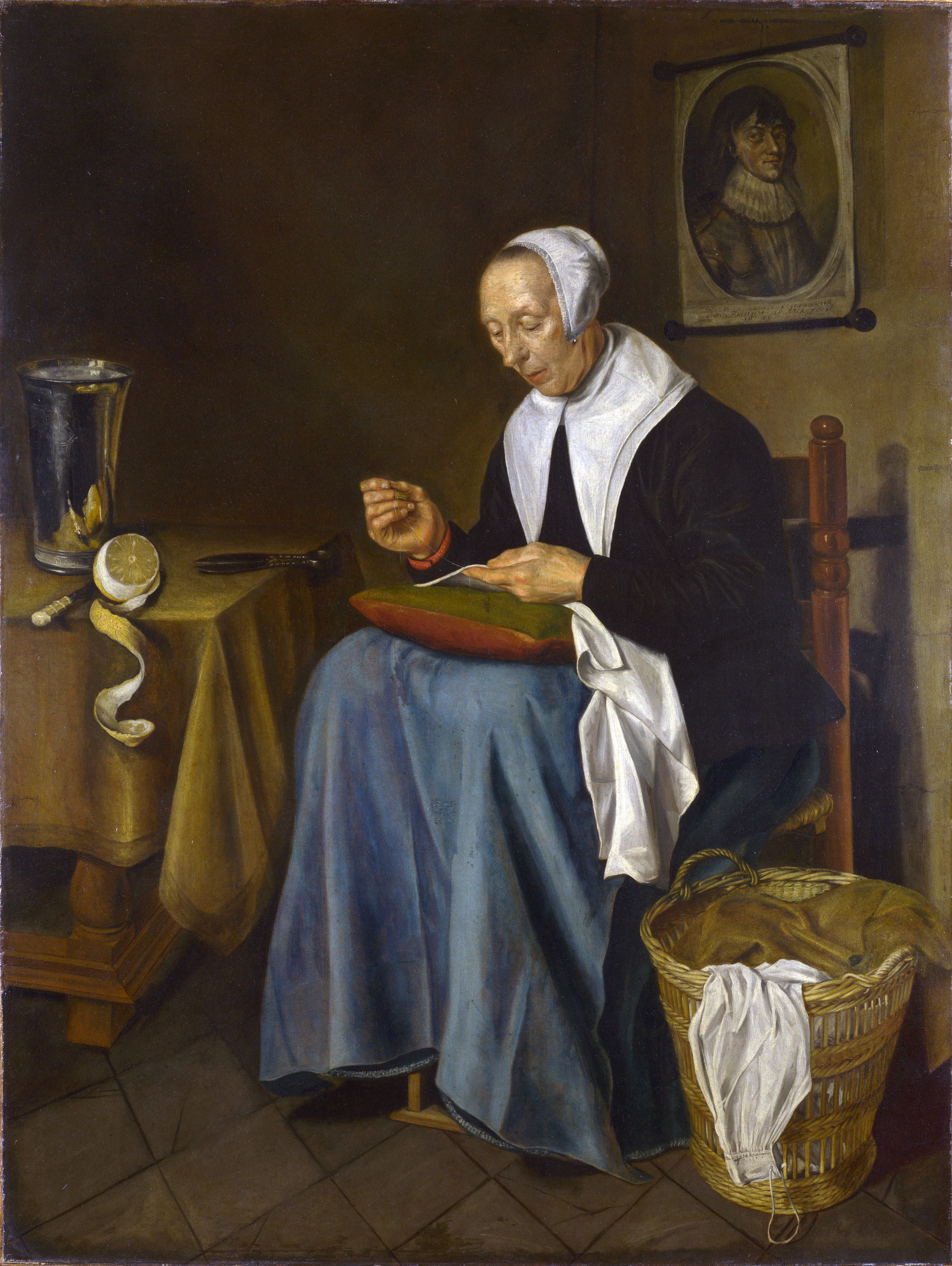
An Old Woman sewing, 1655

Johannes van der Aeck (1636–1682) was a Dutch Golden Age painter.

== Biography ==
According to the RKD he is known for genre works. He was born and died in Leiden. According to the NNBW he was the son of the wine merchant Niclaes van der Aeck and became a member of the Leiden Guild of St. Luke in 1658. He was deacon of the guild in the years in 1673, 1674, and 1676.

== Bibliography ==
- 1 artwork by or after Johannes van der Aeck at the Art UK site
- Johannes van der Aeck on Artnet
