= Dictionary of African Biography =

Six-volume biographical dictionary

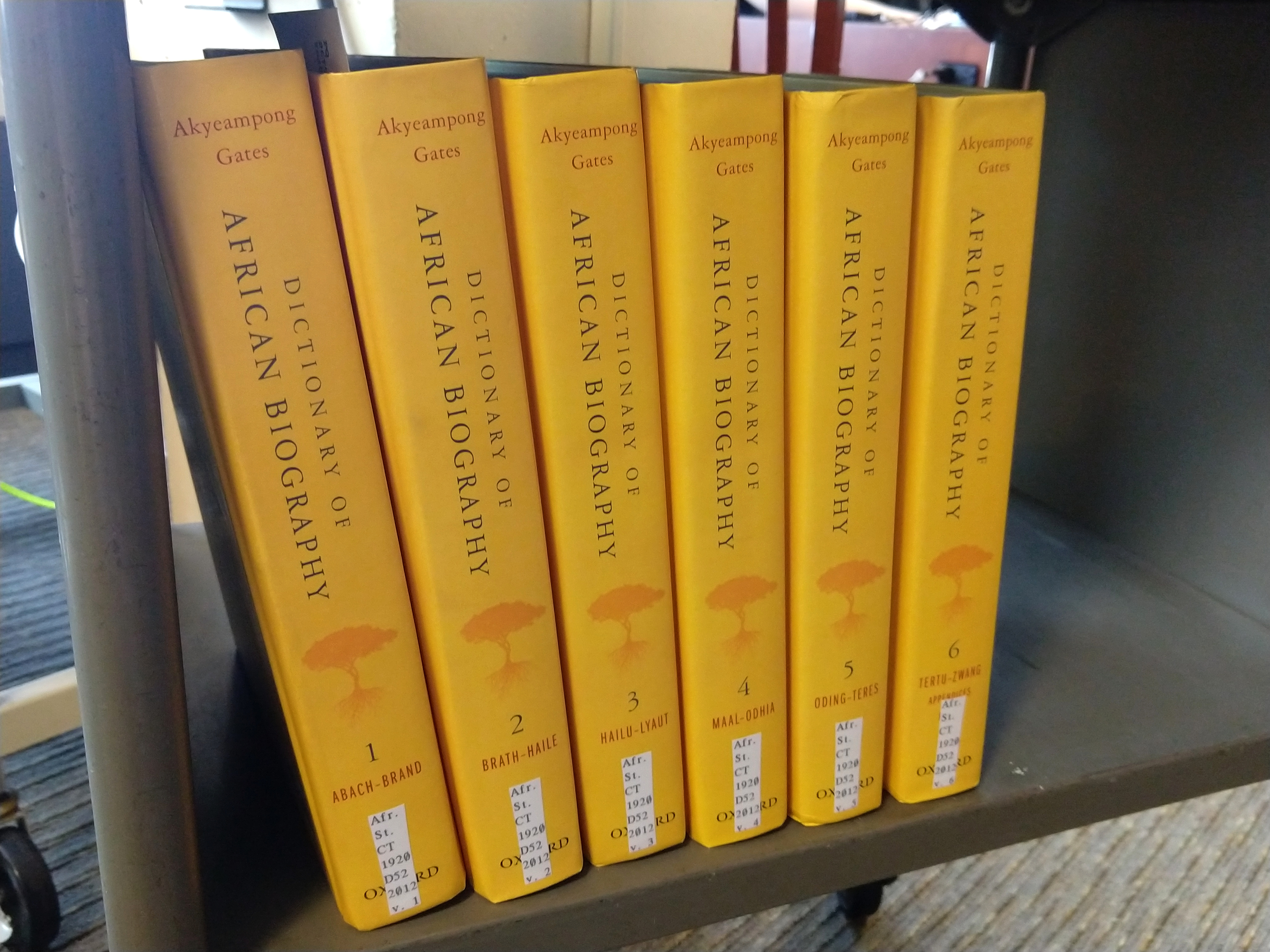
- The Dictionary of African Biography, cataloged for the African Studies library at Boston University
- Language: English
- Genre: biographical dictionary
- Publisher: Oxford University Press
- Publication date: 2012
- ISBN: 9780195382075 vol 1-6
- OCLC: CT1920.D52 2012
- Dewey Decimal: 920.06

The Dictionary of African Biography is a six-volume biographical dictionary, published by Oxford University Press. Published in 2012, the editors-in-chief are Emmanuel K. Akyeampong and Henry Louis Gates, Jr., both of the W. E. B. Du Bois Institute of Harvard University.

The print version of the dictionary has 2,100 entries covering the whole of the continent of Africa, from 1490 BC to today; entries continue to be added online.

== Awards ==
- American Library Association Booklist Editors' Choice: Reference Sources (2012)
