= Who's Who in Japan =

Japanese biographical dictionary

Who's Who in Japan was a Japanese biographical dictionary. Publication began in the 1910s and continued into the 1940s.

== 1st Edition ==
The First Annual Edition is by Shunjiro Kurita. The preface is dated October 1911. The Imperial and Asiatic Quarterly Review said it was "a very useful book of reference giving biographies of some 5,000 prominent men in Japan. The work is the first of its kind to deal with the subject in a pretentious manner and should prove indispensable to all those having business dealings or other relations with Japan. It is printed in English and very well executed." The Japan Evangelist said "The hard-working and pains-taking Mr. Kurita is to be congratulated upon his book now before the public, a really pretentious volume of good form, good print, excellent appearance and moderate price" and "This will be in demand not only in every office in which reference is necessary to a list in English of leading Japanese gentlemen, but every writer on apan and Japanese affairs will feel bound to consult the volume for correct information concerning the prominent actors of the day in this country, and the user will owe a large debt of gratitude to the author."

This edition was also reviewed by The Review of Reviews, The Nautical Magazine, The Chamber of Commerce Journal, The Japan Weekly Chronicle, The Academy and Literature, The Literary Digest and The American Review of Reviews.

== 2nd Edition ==
The Second Annual Edition is by Shunjiro Kurita. The preface is dated March 1913. This edition was reviewed by The Indian Review, The Japan Daily Mail, The American Review of Reviews, The Literary Digest, ALA Booklist and The Nation.

== 4th Edition ==
The Fourth Annual Edition is by Yasujiro Ishikawa. This edition was reviewed by The New York Times.

== 17th Edition ==
The Seventeenth Annual Edition is by Tsunesaburo Kamesaka. This edition was reviewed by Asia.

== 21st Edition ==
The 21st Annual Edition is titled Who's Who in Japan with Manchoukuo and China 1940-1941. The 21st Annual Edition contains 4,800 biographies.
