= Who's Who (UK) =

British biographical dictionary

- 1959 edition
- Language: English
- Release number: 177 (Who's Who 2025)
- Subject: Biography (1897 onwards)
- Genre: Who's Who
- Publisher: A & C Black; Bloomsbury Publishing plc; Oxford University Press
- Publication date: 1849–present
- Publication place: United Kingdom
- ISBN: 9781408181201
- Text: Who's Who at Wikisource
- Website: ukwhoswho.com

Who's Who is a reference work. It has been published annually in the form of a hardback book since 1849, and has been published online since 1999. It has also been published on CD-ROM. It lists, and gives information on, people from around the world who influence British life. Entries include notable figures from government, politics, academia, business, sport and the arts. Who's Who 2025 is the 177th edition and includes more than 32,500 people.

In 2004, the book was described as the United Kingdom's most prominent work of biographical reference.

The book is the original Who's Who book and "the pioneer work of its type". The book is an origin of the expression "who's who" used in a wider sense.

== History ==
Who's Who has been published since 1849.

When book publisher A & C Black bought the copyright to the publication in 1896, Douglas Sladen was employed with a three-year contract to overhaul the publication. According to Sladen, the old Who's Who was solely a "handbook of the titled and official classes only", which he sought to modernize by including celebrities from all circles through the use of autobiographical forms. Between 1897 and 1899, under Sladen, Who's Who expanded its number of entries from 6,000 to 8,500. The inclusion of a "recreations" section for biographees to fill proved to be particularly successful for the book: according to Sladen, newspapers "never tired of quoting the recreations of eminent people", thus attracting publicity for the publication. While Sladen's contract was not renewed, the revised Who's Who experienced financial success: its sales rose from 10,000 to 12,000 copies between 1901 and 1910, in spite of a twofold increase in the book price for that period.

Cedric Arthur Larson stated that Who's Who in 1849 was not biographical. Who's Who turned into a biographical dictionary in 1897. In 1963 and 1975, William Lawrence Rivers wrote that Who's Who then included biographical information.

In 1973, a spinoff version, called The Academic Who's Who, was released by the same publisher. Both the first edition, published in 1973, and the second edition, published in 1975, were published by Adam & Charles Black in London. The first US edition was published by Bowker in New York, and the second by Gale Research in Detroit. The second edition contained biographies of almost seven thousand academics.

Who's Who 1897–1996 was published on CD-ROM and was awarded the McColvin Medal. Who's Who 1897–1998 was also published on CD-ROM. Who's Who was included in KnowUK from 1999. Who's Who 2005 was included in Xreferplus. The Who's Who & Who Was Who website (ukwhoswho.com) is dated from 2007 onwards. Who's Who continues to be published annually in hardback.

A history of Who's Who was published to coincide with the 150th edition in 1998. "Preface with a Brief History 1849–1998" was included in Who's Who 1998.

== Publishers and editors ==
Who's Who was originally published by Baily Brothers. Since 1897, it has been published by A & C Black. It has been published in New York by the Macmillan Company and by St. Martin's Press.

From 1849 to 1850, Who's Who was edited by Henry Robert Addison, from 1851 to 1864 by Charles Henry Oakes, from 1865 by William John Lawson and from 1897 to 1899 by Douglas Sladen. Subsequent editions do not disclose the identity of their editor. In 1990, it was reported that after the departure of Douglas Brooke Wheelton Sladen, the people who compiled Who's Who remained anonymous to conceal the fact that they were female. In 2004, it was reported that the editorial staff and the selection panel endeavour to operate in anonymity so as to shield themselves from unwanted pressures.

In September 2026, Bloomsbury Publishing announced its intention to sell Who's Who; it stated that Who's Who 2027, to be published on 7 December 2026, would be the final volume published by them.

== Biographies ==
Academics who study elites have used the book as the primary reference for deducing who is part of the British elite.

=== Inclusiveness ===
The subjects of Who's Who entries include peers, MPs, judges, senior civil servants, writers, lawyers, scientists, academics, actors, athletes, artists and hereditary aristocrats. 50 percent of new entrants (such as those holding a professorial chair at Oxbridge, baronets, peers, MPs, judges etc.) are included automatically by virtue of their office or title; the other 50 percent are selected at the discretion of a board of advisors. Inclusion has come to carry a considerable level of prestige: Paul Levy stated in The Wall Street Journal in 1996 that having an entry in Who's Who "really puts the stamp of eminence on a modern British life".

Once someone is included in Who's Who they remain in it for life: MPs, for example, are not removed when they leave Parliament. The 7th Earl of Lucan continued to be listed in the book after he went missing in 1974 and even after he was declared legally dead in 1999. He was listed in Who's Who 2016, which was published in 2015. As of 2023, the most recent version of his entry on the Who's Who & Who Was Who website is dated 1 December 2016, his death certificate having been issued in 2016.

Inclusion in Who's Who does not involve any payment by or to the subject, or even any obligation to buy a copy. Some individuals have attempted to offer bribes in attempts to be included.

The publication includes the members of the Scottish Parliament, Welsh and Northern Ireland Assemblies, members of the House of Commons, the chief executives of all UK cities and counties, and foreign ambassadors accredited to London. There was a high proportion of Oxford and Cambridge graduates among the new entrants in Who's Who 2008. During the reign of Queen Victoria, the proportion of such graduates was less than 20%.

In a review of Who's Who, 1907, the Law Magazine and Review declared: "So comprehensive is the scheme of the work that it is well-nigh impossible to find any person at all entitled to be considered prominent in any particular sphere, whose biography is not included". The Expository Times wrote that Who's Who, 1910 included "Everybody who is anybody". The Journal of the Royal Institute of British Architects wrote that the choice of subjects included in Who's Who 1936 was generally appropriate. Writing in The Spectator about a radio documentary on the book they prepared for BBC Radio 4 in 2004, Crick and Rosenbaum criticised, or reported that others had criticised, the publication for its lack of inclusion of well known celebrities, sports personalities, solicitors, and the quasi-totality of Britain's wealthiest people. They also questioned the inclusion of all baronets. In 2007, Jeremy Paxman criticised the publication for failing to include more non-British MEPs. In 2010, Charles Moore criticised the criticism of the inclusiveness of Who's Who. In 2021, it was reported that Michael Grade, who was Chairman of the Board of Governors of the BBC from 2004 to 2006, had criticised Who's Who for failing to include entries for Benedict Cumberbatch and Eddie Redmayne.

Richard Fitzwilliams, former editor of The International Who's Who, quoted in The Independent in 2015, indicated that Arthur Scargill and Tony Benn were included in Who's Who against their wishes, and that W. S. Gilbert was "threatened with being given a concocted version of his entry unless he provided one". Douglas Sladen published or threatened to publish non-autobiographical entries for recalcitrant figures in order to coerce them to submit their own autobiographical forms. In his autobiography, Douglas Sladen wrote: "W. S. Gilbert wrote the rudest letter of anybody. He said he was always being pestered by unimportant people for information about himself. So I put him down in the book as "Writer of Verses and the libretti to Sir Arthur Sullivan's comic operas." He then wrote me a letter . . . in which he asked me if that was the way to treat a man who had written seventy original dramas. Next year he filled up his form as readily as a peer's widow who has married a commoner." In a footnote to the preceding passage from Sladen's autobiography, the historian Philip Waller said that "Sladen did not always allow accuracy to get in the way of a good story", and that the actual facts consist of the inclusion of the line "Writer of Verses and the libretti to Sir Arthur Sullivan's comic operas" in Gilbert's biography in Who's Who 1897 and 1898, and the removal of that line from Gilbert's biography in Who's Who 1899, to which no other changes were made. In his autobiography, Sladen wrote: "A prominent authoress first of all refused to fill up her form at all. I wrote to tell her that in that case I should have to fill it up for her. She showed no concern about this until I sent her a proof of the biography, in which I made her out ten years older than she really was, and said that I meant to insert the biography in that form unless there was anything she wished to correct. She then corrected it, and added so much that it would have taken the whole column if I had inserted all she sent." According to Philip Waller, this "was how Sladen behaved: if celebrities did not deliver, he invented a CV for them. It usually brought them into line." In 2004, it was reported that Scargill had argued that people who do not wish to be in Who's Who should be allowed to opt out.

=== Compilation and authorship ===
From 1897 onwards, entries have been compiled from questionnaires filled in by their subjects and then returned to the publisher. Lea and Day wrote that this approach normally leads to increased accuracy.

It has been said that, from Who's Who 1897 onwards, the entries, or the majority of them, are autobiographical. Nature Notes described the notices of naturalists in Who's Who, 1900 as "virtually autobiographical".

In A & C Black Ltd v Claude Stacey Ltd, Mr Justice Tomlin, sitting in the Chancery Division of the High Court of Justice in England, held that the "author", within the meaning of that expression in section 5 of the Copyright Act 1911, of each biography in Who's Who was the compiler. This decision has been cited as authority as to the meaning of the expression "author" in the Copyright, Designs and Patents Act 1988.

=== Content ===
Entries typically include full names, dates of birth, career details, club memberships, education, professional qualifications, publications, recreations and contact details.

=== Utility ===
Who's Who has been repeatedly described as useful and indispensable.

=== Reliability and accuracy ===
The accuracy of Who's Who 1904 was praised by The Saturday Review, The World's Paper Trade Review, The Law Magazine and Review and The Law Journal. The accuracy of Who's Who, 1905 was praised by The Accountant's Magazine, Canada Lancet and The Law Journal. The accuracy of Who's Who, 1906 was praised by Engineering, Notes and Queries and The Library World. The accuracy of Who's Who, 1907 was praised by The Congregationalist and Christian World, Page's Weekly and the United Service Magazine. Medical Record also praised the accuracy of that edition, but wrote that the book included an entry for a deceased person. The accuracy of Who's Who, 1908 was praised by The Dublin Journal of Medical Science, The Electrical Review and Page's Weekly. The accuracy of Who's Who, 1909 was praised by Country Life, The Scots Law Times, The Empire Review and Magazine and The American Review of Reviews. The accuracy of Who's Who, 1910 was praised by Knowledge & Scientific News, The Railway News, Country Life and Page's Weekly.

The accuracy of Who's Who, 1933 was praised by the Solicitors Journal and by the Journal of State Medicine. The accuracy of Who's Who, 1934 was praised by the Clinical Journal, by the Burlington Magazine and by the Journal of State Medicine. The accuracy of Who's Who 1935 was praised by Public Opinion, by the Solicitors' Journal, by the Irish Law Times and Solicitors' Journal and by the Clinical Journal. The accuracy of Who's Who 1936 was praised by Engineering. The Irish Law Times and Solicitors' Journal also praised the accuracy of that edition, but wrote that the book included an entry for a deceased person. The accuracy of Who's Who 1937 was praised by the Municipal Journal & Public Works Engineer. The accuracy of Who's Who 1938 was praised by the Journal of the Royal Institute of Public Health and Hygiene and by the New Statesman and Nation. The accuracy of Who's Who 1939 was praised by the Journal of the Royal Institute of Public Health and Hygiene.

The accuracy of Who's Who 1940 was praised by the Journal of the Royal Institute of Public Health and Hygiene, and the reliability of that edition was praised by The Tennessee Teacher. The accuracy of Who's Who 1941 was praised by the Journal of the Royal Institute of Public Health and Hygiene, by the Irish Law Times and Solicitors' Journal and by the Municipal Journal & Local Government Administrator. The accuracy of Who's Who, 1942 was praised by the Journal of the Royal Institute of Public Health and Hygiene and by The Accountant. The accuracy of Who's Who, 1943 was praised by the Medical Press and Circular. The accuracy of certain entries in Who's Who, 1944 was praised by the Journal of the Royal Institute of Public Health and Hygiene. The accuracy of Who's Who, 1946 was praised by the Irish Law Times and Solicitors' Journal. The accuracy of Who's Who, 1949 was praised by Subscription Books Bulletin.

In 1957, the reliability of Who's Who was praised by Ajit Kumar Mukherjee.

The accuracy and reliability of Who's Who 1970 was praised by Bohdan Stephan Wynar. The accuracy of Who's Who 1973 was praised by Reference and Subscription Books Reviews. In 1974, the reliability of Who's Who was praised by John Richard Meredith Wilson. In 1975, the accuracy of Who's Who was praised by Carolyn Sue Peterson.

The accuracy of Who's Who 1982 was praised by Jefferson D Caskey. The accuracy of Who's Who 1985 was praised by Jefferson D Caskey. In 1986, the reliability of Who's Who was praised by John Richard Meredith Wilson. The accuracy of the entry for Reginald William Revans in Who's Who 1987 was praised by Yury Boshyk and Robert Lexow Dilworth.

In 1995, the reliability of Who's Who was praised by Professor Glenda Norquay.

In 2001, BBC News qualified some of the entrants as "a little economical with the truth". Writing in The Spectator about a radio documentary on the book they prepared for BBC Radio 4 in 2004, Michael Crick and Martin Rosenbaum wrote that there were questions about the accuracy of the entries, but that they frequently used Who's Who themselves in their work as journalists. In 2007, the reliability of Who's Who Online was praised by William Ashford Kelly. In 2014, the reliability of the Who's Who & Who Was Who website was praised by Fred Burchsted.

Subjects are not permitted to include libellous statements in their entries. In 2004, the publishing director for reference books of Bloomsbury, which owns A & C Black, the publisher of Who's Who, stated that if an inaccuracy was brought to the attention of the editors, they would raise it with the biographee first. If the biographee insisted or failed to respond, however, no correction would be issued. The director stated that "the vast majority of errors" are sorted by mutual agreement between Who's Who and the biographee.

==== Dates of birth ====
In 2004, Crick and Rosenbaum wrote that the largest number of errors were in dates of birth. It has been reported that entries for Mohamed al-Fayed, Anita Brookner, Ken Dodd, Susan Hampshire, Nanette Newman, and Nicholas Parsons have displayed incorrect dates of birth. The BBC claimed that when Brookner was asked by the editors of Who's Who whether she wanted her date of birth corrected, she asked to have it blanked instead. Errors in the dates of birth of Mohamed al-Fayed, Ken Dodd and Susan Hampshire had previously been reported by Compton Miller, editor of Who's Really Who, in a book review of A & C Black's Who's Who 1998, in which Compton Miller praised the entries for Mohamed al-Fayed, Ken Dodd and Susan Hampshire in his own book. It has been reported that the entry for Jimmy Wray has displayed a disputed date of birth.

==== Particular entries ====
In 2001, BBC News claimed that former MP Jeffrey Archer had listed Brasenose College, Oxford, under the education part of his Who's Who entry, despite having no degree and having only attended a one-year postgraduate physical education course. Previously, in a 1997 letter to the editor of The Independent, Paul Flather of Oxford University had written that the training course Archer had taken at Brasenose College was "not strictly a university course", and that his Who's Who entry also incorrectly listed his year of attendance. In 2004, Crick and Rosenbaum claimed that the entry for Archer had also listed an incorrect sum of money.

The entry for Iain Duncan Smith in (in particular) Who's Who 2002 and Who's Who 2003 claimed that he had been educated at "Univ. di Perugia". This claim did not appear in Who's Who 2004. In 2002, BBC Newsnight reported that Duncan Smith had attended the Università per Stranieri di Perugia and had never attended the Università degli Studi di Perugia.

The entry for James Gulliver in (in particular) Who's Who 1972, Who's Who 1973, Who's Who 1980, Who's Who 1985 and Who's Who 1986, stated that he had been educated at Harvard University and did not mention that he had been educated at, and had received an MSc degree from the Georgia Institute of Technology in 1954. The press repeatedly reported that Gulliver had received an MBA from Harvard Business School. Those press reports were not correct. He had, in fact, done a marketing course at Harvard Business School for three weeks in 1954. On 9 March 1986, Gulliver said that his Who's Who entry was not correct in relation "to a degree achieved in 1954". The press had been informed of the error by a PR company working for an alcohol company that Gulliver's company had bid to takeover. Paddy Ashdown said that the PR company had performed "a rather unsavoury and tawdry" character "assassination". The bald statement that Gulliver was educated at the Harvard University has been characterized as having a tendency to mislead.

In 2004, Crick and Rosenbaum reported that Arthur Scargill had denied that his entry was completely accurate.

=== Omissions ===
In 2004, Crick and Rosenbaum named six people whose entries were claimed to have contained at least one omission at some point in time (excluding entries claimed to have displayed at least one error at some point in time).

Jeremy Paxman has calculated that only 8% of new entrants in 2008 made any reference to marital breakdown, which is far below the national average.

The non-autobiographical entry for W. S. Gilbert in Who's Who 1897 and Who's Who 1898 did not include the fact that Gilbert had written seventy original dramas.

== Lists and tables ==
The original nucleus of Who's Who consisted of tables. In a review of Who's Who 1903, the Surveyor and Municipal and County Engineer wrote "From time to time it has been found necessary to remove some useful tables inserted in the front of the book, in order to make room for the biographies, and now the portentous increase of the latter has led to the complete removal of the tables, with the exception, of course, of those devoted to the Royal Family and to obituaries. The publishers hope [...] to issue the various tables separately [...] at a later date." The tables were moved into the Who's Who Year Book from the first edition of that year book, the Who's Who Year Book, 1904, onwards.

== Who Was Who ==
When the subject of a Who's Who entry dies, the biography is transferred to the next volume of Who Was Who, where it is usually printed as it appeared in its last Who's Who, with the date of death added.

The first volume of Who Was Who covered deaths between 1897 and 1915. They were then published at 10-year intervals, and since 1990 at five-year intervals.

Who Was Who series:

1. 1897–1915, 1988 reprint: ISBN 0-7136-2670-4
2. 1916–1928, 1992 reprint: ISBN 0-7136-3143-0
3. 1929–1940, 1967 reprint: ISBN 0-7136-0171-X
4. 1941–1950, 1980 reprint: ISBN 0-7136-2131-1
5. 1951–1960, 1984 reprint: ISBN 0-7136-2598-8
6. 1961–1970, 1979 reprint: ISBN 0-7136-2008-0
7. 1971–1980, 1989 reprint: ISBN 0-7136-3227-5
8. 1981–1990: 1991 ISBN 0-7136-3336-0
9. 1991–1995: 1996 ISBN 0-7136-4496-6
10. 1996–2000: 2001 ISBN 0-7136-5439-2
11. 2001–2005: 2006 ISBN 0-7136-7601-9
12. 2006–2010: 2011 ISBN 9781408146583
13. 2011–2015: 2016 ISBN 9781472924322

Corrections

Errors contained in Who's Who entries are corrected in Who Was Who "where necessary" (the deceased subjects cannot object to corrections because they are deceased).

Cumulated index

There is a cumulative index, titled "cumulated index":

- Who Was Who, A Cumulated Index 1897 to 1980. Published 1981.
- Who Was Who: A Cumulated Index 1897–1990. Published 1991.
- Who Was Who: A Cumulated Index 1897—2000. Published 2002.

== See also ==
- List of biographical dictionaries
