= Zhongguo Renming Dacidian =

Chinese biographical dictionary (1921–)

Zhongguo Renming Dacidian (中国人名大辞典, first published 1921), literally "Great Biographical Dictionary of China", is the leading biographical dictionary in China, to some extent comparable with Who's Who. The publisher is The Commercial Press, Shanghai. In English bibliographies it is sometimes referred to by English titles, although an English version does not exist; sometimes by its Chinese title in pinyin.

The original 1921 editors were Fang Baoguan (方宝观), Fang Yi (方毅) and a team of 23 editors. Although the Chinese title is only used by Commercial Press, longer titles including the Commercial Press title have occasionally appeared from other publishers for more specialist works. For example, Zhongguo Renming Dacidian: Xianren Dang-zhengjun Lingdao Renwujuan ("Who's Who in China: Current Leaders in the Party, Government, and Military") is published by Beijing Foreign Languages Publishing House.
