= Biografisch Woordenboek van Nederland =

Dutch biographical dictionary

The Biografisch Woordenboek van Nederland 1880–2000 (BWN) is a Dutch biographical dictionary, in which short biographies of well-known and less well-known but still notable Dutch people are listed.

The BWN supplements the Nieuw Nederlandsch Biografisch Woordenboek (NNBW), which was published between 1911 and 1937 in ten parts. That work only includes people who died before 1910.

In 1971, historian Ivo Schöffer from Leiden took the initiative for a continuation. The first part of the BWN was published in 1979. The sixth and last part was published in 2009.

The biographies in the BWN were written by many different authors. These biographies are available via the Dutch Biography Portal (Het Biografisch Portaal van Nederland).
