= Baker's Biographical Dictionary of Musicians =

Reference work

- Author: Theodore Baker
- Publication date: 1900

Baker's Biographical Dictionary of Musicians is a major reference work in the field of music, originally compiled by Theodore Baker, PhD, and published in 1900 by G. Schirmer, Inc. The ninth edition, the most recent edition, was published in 2001.

== Edition history ==
Leading up to the initial publication of Baker's Biographical Dictionary of Musicians, Baker had compiled and edited three editions of A Dictionary of Musical Terms — published 1895, 1896, and 1897, respectively, by G. Schirmer, Inc.

=== First edition ===
The first edition, published in 1900, has 647 pages plus an Appendix of 5 pages. It includes 300 vignette portraits drawn in ink, from portraits or photographs, by Russian artist Alexander Gribayédoff (possibly a pseudonym for Valerian Gribayédoff).

=== Fourth edition ===
The fourth edition, published in 1940, has 1,234 pages. American and Latin-American musicians were more fully represented in this issue than in any English work of the kind in its day.

=== Fifth edition ===
The fifth edition was rewritten by new editor Nicolas Slonimsky, who would remain editor for several decades (up to the eighth edition in 1992) and have a considerable influence on the style and content of the dictionary. In preparing the fifth edition, Slonimsky expanded the size of the work to 1,855 pages and undertook a thorough review of the existing entries, expending considerable effort verifying and correcting biographical details such as birth and death dates by reference to archival sources.

=== Eighth edition ===
The eighth edition of 1992 revised 1,300 entries and added 1,100 new ones, coming to 2,115 pages, with an emphasis on expanding coverage of female and Asian musicians, multimedia composers, performance artists, and ethnomusicologists. The seventh and eighth editions were pre-titled The Concise Edition.

=== Ninth edition ===
The ninth edition of 2001, billed the "Centennial Edition", was the first not to be a single-volume work, taking up six volumes, partly due to expanded coverage and partly due to somewhat more generous formatting to improve readability. The ninth edition included a focus on increasing coverage of popular music and jazz.

== History of its publishers ==
G. Schirmer, Inc., publisher of Baker's since the first edition, was sold to Macmillan Inc. in 1969.

Macmillan sold G. Schirmer, except for its reference holdings, to Music Sales Corporation of London in 1986. Schirmer Reference is currently owned by Gale, a division of Cengage Learning.

== Editions ==
Edited by Theodore Baker (1851–1934)

- First edition (1900); OCLC 883343, 62173978

Supplement (1905); OCLC 1915971

- Second edition (1905); OCLC 28877528

Edited by Theodore Baker and Alfred Remy (1870–1927)

- Third edition (1919); OCLC 752566

Edited by Nicolas Slonimsky (1894–1995)

- Fourth edition (revised & enlarged) (1940); OCLC 557935018, 780647631, 926808623

Second printing (revised & enlarged) (1940); OCLC 557935009
Third printing (revised & enlarged) (1949); OCLC 6218573, 557935018

- Fifth edition (1958); OCLC 598288, 756726565

Supplement (1965); OCLC 658821397
Supplement (1971); OCLC 1130888, 29058886

- Sixth edition (1978); OCLC 4426869, 723489824
- Seventh edition (1984); OCLC 894666159, 52719848, ISBN 0-02-872411-9, ISBN 978-0-02-872411-9

Abridged (1988); OCLC 17225213, 59699073

- Eighth edition (1992); OCLC 24246972, ISBN 0-02-872415-1, ISBN 978-0-02-872415-7

Edited by Laura Diane Kuhn, PhD (born 1953)

- Ninth edition (2001); OCLC 44972043, ISBN 0-02-865525-7, ISBN 978-0-02-865525-3

Vol. 1: Aalt–Cone; OCLC 313884911
Vol. 2: Conf–Gysi; OCLC 313884977
Vol. 3: Haar–Levi; OCLC 313884997
Vol. 4: Levy–Pisa; OCLC 313885028
Vol. 5: Pisc–Stra; OCLC 313885106
Vol. 6: Stre–Zyli; Indexes (genre, nationality, women); OCLC 313885131

pdf version; OCLC 312475801
eBook version (released 2007); OCLC 874280359, ISBN 978-0-02-866091-2, ISBN 0-02-866091-9

Other editions

- The Portable Baker's Biographical Dictionary of Musicians (1988); OCLC 32968695 ISBN 0-8256-9394-2

Slonimsky (ed.); Richard Kostelanetz (ed.); Michael Stutzman (assistant ed.)

- Baker's Biographical Dictionary of Twentieth-Century Classical Musicians (1997), Nicolas Slonimsky, Laura Kuhn (born January 19, 1953) (ed.), Dennis McIntire (Associate ed.) OCLC 924775962 ISBN 0-02-871271-4

== Other works of similar nature ==
Earlier works
1844: Complete Encyclopedia of Music, Elementary, Technical, Historical, Biographical, Vocal, and Instrumental, by John Weeks Moore, Boston; OCLC 4659526
1879: A Dictionary of Music and Musicians, George Grove (ed.), London; OCLC 313377471, 717493999

Later, contemporaneous American works
1939: International Cyclopedia of Music and Musicians, Oscar Lee Thompson (1887–1945) (ed.), Dodd, Mead and Company, New York; OCLC 518786
