= John Lauris Blake =

John Lauris Blake (December 21, 1788 – July 6, 1857) was an American clergyman and bestselling author. He is best known as the author of the General Biographical Dictionary.

== Life ==
John Lauris Blake was born on 21 December 1788 in Northwood, New Hampshire. During his adolescence, he practiced cabinet making and at the same time prepared himself for college. He graduated from Brown University in 1812, and was licensed as a Congregational minister in 1813.

Blake founded the Ladies' Magazine, served as headmaster of the Cornhill School for Young Ladies, and was a member of the committee of Boston public schools.

Blake was elected as a member of the American Antiquarian Society in 1815. A significant number of original 19th-century copies of works authored by Blake are held in the collections of the AAS.

== Bibliography ==
Blake was an editor of the Literary Advertiser and the Gospel Advocate. His published books include:

- A Text Book of Geography and Chronology (1814)
- Anecdotes of American Indians (1835)
- The Wonders of Art; Containing An Account of Celebrated Ancient Ruins; Fortifications; Public Edifices; Monuments; and some of The Most Curious and Useful Inventions in Modern Times (1845)
- A General Biographical Dictionary (1835, 13th ed., 1856)
- The Parlor Book or Family Encyclopædia of Useful Knowledge and General Literature (1837)
- Farm and Fireside (1852)
- Farmer's Every Day Book (1852)
- Evidences of Christianity (1852)
- Modern Farmer (1853)
- A Cyclopædia of Modern Agriculture (1856)

== See also ==
- John L. Blake
