= Biographical Dictionary of Republican China =

Reference on China in 1911–1949

Biographical Dictionary of Republican China is a biographical dictionary in four-volumes, often abbreviated as BDRC or referred to as "Boorman". It was published from 1967 to 1971 by Columbia University Press, edited by Howard L. Boorman, Director of the Research Project on Men and Politics in Modern China at Columbia University, with Richard C. Howard and O. Edmund Clubb. It includes 600 biographical articles written by some seventy-five contributors on men and women prominent in China's Republican period (1911–1949). Their careers are followed beyond 1949, some until 1966. More than half of the subjects are in politics, military, diplomacy or administration; a little more than a quarter intellectuals, such as scholars, journalists, propagandists; 10.8% in the arts; 7% in professions such as doctors, jurists, and clergy; and only 6.2% in business.

Volume IV includes bibliographical references for all volumes. A fifth volume, A Personal Name Index, compiled by Jane Krompart, is a full name-index to the biographies in the first four volumes, with Chinese characters for more than 90% of the Chinese names, references to three other English-language biographical dictionaries, and the dates of death for those who died since the original entries.

== Reception ==
John K. Fairbank reviewed the first volume in the American Historical Review He noted that Boorman had retired from the Foreign Service and now worked at Columbia University, where Martin Wilbur had created an oral history project. Fairbank compared Boorman's project to Arthur W. Hummel Sr.'s two-volume Eminent Chinese of the Ch'ing Period (1644–1912), which he called the "chief vestibule to Chinese history in modern times." In comparison, Boorman "has been able to surmount some appalling difficulties." Eminent Chinese, he said, had the advantage of biographical data generated in stable forms by the imperial bureaucracy and the imperial examination system. But the Republican period was divided into the Peking government and warlord period (1912–1928) and the Nationalist period (1928–1949), each with a number of political parties and conflicting social and cultural systems.

The French Marxist historian Jean Chesneaux congratulated Boorman and his colleagues for including not only political and intellectual figures, but also bourgeois professionals and non-Han subjects. He then criticized the overemphasis on figures with ties to the West, an "optical error" coming from the fact that so many of the contributors were themselves Chinese scholars living in the United States. He regretted that coverage focused on careers without discussion of views or significance, especially on figures on the left. He suggested that the coverage should also have included influential foreigners whose careers were important for Chinese history; the only such representation was a six column article, "Lei Ming-yuan" (Father Vincent Lebbe). The historian Lucien Bianco said it was unfortunate that the articles were not signed, although contributors might have felt protected when writing on controversial figures. He found that the selection was tilted toward liberals and the "third force," many of whom were among the contributors to the volume, also a difference in the relative length of the articles in favor of Kuomintang figures and scientists, as opposed to communists, writers, and artists. Still, he said, these were "cavils."

Professor David Lindenfeld found that nearly half of the figures in these volumes had studied abroad, but the selection was not "plutocratic," showing that the educational system offered the chance for upward mobility. Some 10% were Christian. Lindenfeld used the BDRC data on birth, family background, education, and so forth to argue that the differences between Christians and non-Christians were "not as great as one might expect."

Another reviewer suggested a sixth volume with a topical index would be desirable, but added that this would be "greedy."

Christian Henriot, while commenting on the BDRC "served generations of China historians as the main reference work one would turn to to seek biographical information when studying the Republican period," added that while scholars continue to rely on it, among students it is very likely that the BDRC is "no longer a resource," since "the internet-born generation will more likely rely on digital resources and tools and Google and Wikipedia, not to mention their Chinese avatar like Baidu." He hoped that his X-Boorman project, putting the BDRC online with pinyin romanization would remedy this situation.

== X-Boorman digital revival 2021 ==
In 2021, X-Boorman: a digital revival announced "X-Boorman", a project of Elites, Networks and Power in modern China. The project allows entrance into BDRC original articles and produces data sets and a graph visualization instrument to feed into the Modern China Biographical Database.

== Volumes ==
- Boorman, Howard L., ed. (1967), Biographical Dictionary of Republican China Volume I: Ai-Ch'ü, Richard C. Howard, Associate Editor, New York: Columbia University Press, ISBN 0231089589. Online at Internet Archive here.
- ——, ed. (1970), Biographical Dictionary of Republican China Vol II Dali-Ma, Richard C. Howard, Associate Editor, New York: Columbia University Press Online at Internet Archive here
- ——, ed. (1970), Biographical Dictionary of Republican China Vol III Mao-Wu, et al., New York: Columbia University Press, ISBN 0231045581 Online at Internet Archive here.
- ——, ed. (1971), Biographical Dictionary of Republican China Vol IV Yang-Yun Bibliography, Richard C. Howard, Associate Editor, Bibliography by Joseph K.H. Cheng, New York: Columbia University Press Online at Internet Archive here.
- Krompart, Jane (1979). Biographical Dictionary of Republican China Vol V: A Personal Name Index. New York: Columbia University Press.
