= Alfred Remy =

Alfred Remy, M.A. (March 16, 1870 – February 26, 1937, New York, NY) was an American philologist and writer on music, born in Elberfeld, Germany. He emigrated to the United States when he was very young. He graduated from the College of the City of New York in 1890 and from Columbia (A.M., 1905). He taught languages in several schools and was a music critic for Vogue. His publications include Alarcon's Novelas Cortas Escogidas (1905) and Spanish Prose Composition (1908). He edited the third edition of Theodore Baker's Biographical Dictionary of Musicians.
