= John Gorton (writer) =

English writer (died 1835)

John Gorton (died 1835) was an English writer, known as a compiler of reference works.

His works include:

A Topographical Dictionary of Great Britain and Ireland

- A translation of Voltaire's Dictionnaire Philosophique, 1824;
- A General Biographical Dictionary (2 vols. 1828, with an appendix, 1830), new edition, with a supplement by Cyrus Redding, bringing the work as far as 1850, in 4 vols. 1851);
- A Topographical Dictionary of Great Britain and Ireland, with Irish and Welsh articles by G. N. Wright, and maps by S. Hall, 3 vols. 1831–3, first published in separate parts;
- A poem in blank verse, Tubal to Seba, the Negro Suicide, 1797; and
- A pamphlet entitled ‘A Solution of that great Scriptural Difficulty the Genealogy of Jesus … with a treatise on the Fall of Adam.’

== Notes ==
- "Gorton, John" . Dictionary of National Biography. London: Smith, Elder & Co. 1885–1900.
