= Academic Who's Who =

British biographical dictionary

The Academic Who's Who is a book. It was a spin off from the main Who's Who by the same publisher. The first edition of The Academic Who's Who for 1973 to 1974 was published by Adam & Charles Black in London in 1973, and distributed in New York by R. R. Bowker. The second edition for 1975 to 1976 was published by Adam & Charles Black in London in 1975, and distributed in Detroit by Gale Research. The subtitle of the Academic Who's Who is University Teachers in the British Isles in the Arts, Education and Social Sciences. The second edition contained biographies of almost seven thousand academics. The Glasgow Herald said the first edition was "valuable".
