= Biographical Dictionary of the Common Law =

1984 biographical dictionary

Biographical Dictionary of the Common Law is a biographical dictionary concerned with legal biography, edited by A. W. B. Simpson and published in 1984 by Butterworths. Hines called it "valuable". Holborn described it as a "handy starting point". Tearle said it is "the best source to consult first". Clinch called it "invaluable".
