= Scott Boorman =

American sociologist (born 1949)

Scott Archer Boorman (born February 1, 1949) is a mathematical sociologist at Yale University.

== Life ==
His father, Howard L. Boorman, was a Foreign Service Officer in Beijing, China, and he was born there as Chinese Communists troops entered the city. He received no formal education before enrolling at Harvard College, and had largely completed work on his book, The Protracted Game, which was published in 1971.

He earned his B.A. in Applied Mathematics, and was a Harvard Junior Fellow. He received his Ph.D. in Sociology from Harvard University and was appointed to a full professorship at Penn before moving to Yale. He is also a graduate of Yale Law School.

== Works ==
While still a teenager, Boorman wrote The Protracted Game : A Wei-Ch'i Interpretation of Maoist Revolutionary Strategy (1969), an analysis of the U.S. involvement in Vietnam. He shows that the U.S. thought it was playing Chess, while in fact the game was Wei-Ch'i (also known as Go).

He systematically explores the similarity between the military strategies of Chinese Communist insurgency and the Chinese board game wei-ch’i, in contrast to parallel U.S. analyses of the same events. Boorman also argues that wei-chi's analysis of a strategic system presents a more sophisticated and flexible form of game theory than the traditional western models of strategic choice.

His book, Genetics of Altruism (1980) uses mathematical population genetics to analyze the development of sociality and altruism through three modes of selection: group, kin and reciprocity.
