= Alexander Chalmers =

Scottish writer

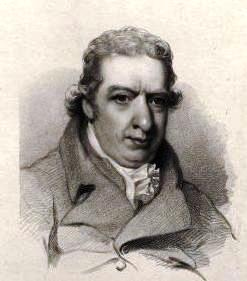
- Born: 29 March 1759; Aberdeen, Scotland
- Died: 29 December 1834 (aged 75); London, England
- Occupation: Writer
- Known for: Biography

Alexander Chalmers (/ˈtʃɑːmərz/; 29 March 1759 – 29 December 1834) was a Scottish writer.

He was born in Aberdeen. Trained as a doctor, he gave up medicine for journalism, and was for some time editor of the Morning Herald. Besides editions of the works of William Shakespeare, James Beattie, Henry Fielding, Samuel Johnson, Joseph Warton, Alexander Pope, Edward Gibbon, and Henry St John, Viscount Bolingbroke, he published A General Biographical Dictionary in 32 volumes (1812–1817); a Glossary to Shakspeare (1807); an edition of George Steevens's Shakespeare (1809); and the British Essayists, beginning with the Tatler and ending with the Observer, with biographical and historical prefaces and a general index.

A quotation is often attributed to him: "The three grand essentials of happiness are: Something to do, someone to love, and something to hope for." His papers are held at the National Library of Scotland.

== Sources ==
- Cooper, Thompson (1887). "Chalmers, Alexander" . In Stephen, Leslie (ed.). Dictionary of National Biography. Vol. 9. London: Smith, Elder & Co.
