= Howard L. Boorman =

US Foreign Service officer and biographical dictionary editor

Howard Lyon Boorman (b. 11 September 1920 Chicago d. 17 February 2008) was a United States Foreign Service Officer who after retirement became best known for organizing and editing the Biographical Dictionary of Republican China a standard reference work commonly referred to simply as "Boorman."

== Career ==
Howard Boorman was born Chicago, Illinois to William Ryland and Verna Lyon Boorman, who moved to Grinnell, Iowa, in 1935, where he graduated from Grinnell High School. After studying briefly at Grinnell College, Boorman finished his undergraduate education at University of Wisconsin in 1941. He first entered the Department of State, then joined the Navy. He studied Japanese at the Navy Language School in Boulder, Colorado, and became Lieutenant Japanese Language Officer. He served at the Joint Intelligence Center Pacific Ocean Area, which was located in Hawai'i, served a translator for General LeMay’s 21st Bomber Command. and was attached to the Marine Division that accepted the surrender of Japanese military, assisting with Japanese POWs.

After the war, he entered the graduate program at Yale, leaving in 1947 to become a Foreign Service Officer. He was posted to Beijing, but after the Chinese Communist Revolution in 1949, Boorman was posted to Hong Kong where the Consulate developed resources to monitor and translate the mainland press. He returned to work at Columbia University, where he won the Rockefeller Public Service Award in 1954–55. He began work on the four volume Biographical Dictionary of Republican China in 1955. In 1967, Boorman joined the History Department of Vanderbilt University, Nashville, Tennessee. He retired from teaching in 1984.

In 1971, he and his son Scott, collaborated on a book that drew a parallel between Chinese military and diplomatic strategy and the Chinese game of go.

Boorman married twice. He married Margaret Stelle in 1948, in Beijing, where their son, Scott, was born in 1949. In 1970, he married Mary Houghton, whose father, Henry Spencer Houghton, helped to found the Peking Union Medical College. She died in 2000. Boorman died February 17th 2008.

== Biographical Dictionary of Republican China ==
The four-volume biographical dictionary contains biographical articles on 600 prominent figures of the Republican period (1911–1949). Although it was published before much new material became available, it remains a valuable starting point.

== Selected publications ==
=== Selected articles ===
- "The Sino-Soviet Alliance: A New Dimension in World Politics," Journal of International Affairs 11.2 (1957): 122-134.
- "China and the Global Revolution," The China Quarterly 1.1 (1960): 3-5.
- "The Study of Contemporary Chinese Politics: Some Remarks on Retarded Development," World Politics 12.4 (1960): 585-599.
- "Peking in World Politics," Pacific Affairs 34.3 (1961): 227-241.
- "Liu Shao-Ch'i: A Political Profile," The China Quarterly 10 (1962): 1-22.
- Boorman, Howard L. (1962). "The Biographical Approach to Chinese History: A Symposium: Preliminary Reflections". The Journal of Asian Studies. 21 (4): 453–455. doi:10.2307/2050874. JSTOR 2050874. S2CID 197836804.
- "From Shanghai to Peking: The Politics of a Revolution," The Journal of Asian Studies 23.1 (1963): 113-119.
- "Mao Tse-Tung: The Lacquered Image," The China Quarterly 16.16 (1963): 1-55.
- "The Literary World of Mao Tse-Tung," The China Quarterly 13.13 (1963): 15-38.
- "How to Be a Good Communist: The Political Ethics of Liu Shao-Ch'i," Asian Survey 3.8 (1963): 372-383.
- "Wang Ching-Wei: China's Romantic Radical," Political Science Quarterly 79.4 (1964): 504-525.
- "Tung Pi-Wu: A Political Profile," The China Quarterly 19 (1964): 66-83.
- "Mao Tse-Tung at Seventy: An American Dilemma," The Virginia Quarterly Review 40.2 (1964): 182-200.
- Boorman, Scott A.; Boorman, Howard L. (1964). "Mao Tse-Tung and the Art of War". The Journal of Asian Studies. 24 (1): 129–137. doi:10.2307/2050423. JSTOR 2050423. S2CID 161476583.
- "Teng Hsiao-P'ing: A Political Profile," The China Quarterly 21.21 (1965): 108-125.
- "Mao Tse-Tung as Historian," The China Quarterly 28 (1966): 82-105.
- "Sources of Chinese Communist Conduct," The Virginia Quarterly Review 42.4 (1966): 512-526.
- with Scott A. Boorman, "Chinese Communist Insurgent Warfare, 1935-49," Political Science Quarterly 81.2 (1966): 171-195.

=== Books and edited volumes ===
- Moscow-Peking Axis: Strengths and Strains. (New York: Published for the Council on Foreign Relations by Harper, 1957). ISBN

=== Biographical Dictionary of Republican China ===
- Boorman, Howard L., Richard C. Howard, Associate Editor. (1967). Biographical Dictionary of Republican China Volume I: Ai-Ch'ü. New York: Columbia University Press. ISBN 0-231-08958-9.. Online at Internet Archive here.
- Boorman, Howard L., Richard C. Howard Associate Editor (1970). Biographical Dictionary of Republican China Vol II Dali-Ma. New York: Columbia University Press. Online at Internet Archive here
- Boorman, Howard L., et al., eds (1970). Biographical Dictionary of Republican China Vol III Mao-Wu. New York: Columbia University Press. ISBN 0-231-04558-1. Online at Internet Archive here.
- Boorman, Howard L., Richard C. Howard Associate Editor, Bibliography by Joseph K.H. Cheng (1971). Biographical Dictionary of Republican China Vol IV Yang-Yun Bibliography. New York: Columbia University Press. Online at Internet Archive here.
- Krompart, Jane (1979). Biographical Dictionary of Republican China Vol V: A Personal Name Index. New York: Columbia University Press.
