= Abdulkhaliq Jannati =

Azerbaijani poet (1855–1931)

Abdulkhalig Jannati
- Əbdülxalıq Cənnəti
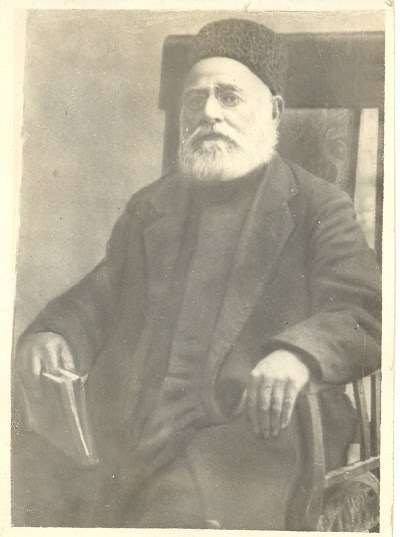
- Born: 6 June 1855; Baku, Baku Governorate, Russian Empire
- Died: 1931; Baku, Azerbaijan Soviet Socialist Republic, Soviet Union
- Education: Religious education
- Occupations: Poet, Educator
- Writing career
- Pen name: Jannati (also used: Vasif, Attar, Heccarzadeh, Dashkesenoghlu)
- Language: Azerbaijani, Persian
- Genres: Poetry, Didactic literature
- Literary movement: Literary Turanism

Abdulkhaliq Qafarzade, also known as Abdulkhaliq Jannati (1855–1931), was an Azerbaijani poet and educator, recognized as one of the figures who created a bridge between classical poetry and the realist and romantic movements. He was also among the early proponents of the poetic Turanism ideology.

He was an active member of the literary society "Majma‘ush-Shu‘ara" based in Baku and one of the enlightenment-oriented Azerbaijani intellectuals associated with the journal Fuyuzat. Qafarzade composed poetry and ghazals in both classical Azerbaijani and Persian styles. Additionally, he authored the narrative poems The Maiden Tower and The Sword and the Pen.

== Biography ==
Abdulkhaliq Jannati Qafarzade is recognized as one of the continuators of classical Azerbaijani poetry in the late 19th and early 20th centuries. He was born in 1855 in Baku. Although detailed and continuous information about his life is limited, existing sources allow for a general understanding of his personality and literary activity.

His family background reflected diverse social strata: his maternal grandfather served as a chief huntsman for the Khan of Baku, while his father worked as a laborer in a stone quarry.

Jannati began his education at the age of nine, initially studying in a religious school (mollakhana) and later receiving private tutoring. Due to economic difficulties, he started working from the age of twelve and apprenticed under various craftsmen.

His interest in literature and poetry developed after meeting a poetry enthusiast, whose literary discussions significantly influenced Jannati and inspired him to begin writing poetry. From the age of eighteen, he actively engaged in poetry while balancing work and attending literary gatherings.

Jannati's personal life was marked by hardships, including the untimely loss of his children, which affected his health.

He died in 1931 in his native city of Baku.

== Works ==
Abdulkhaliq Jannati began composing poetry from a young age. In the early period of his career, he wrote love ghazals and elegies in the classical style. Well-versed in classical Eastern poetry, he studied the works of poets such as Ferdowsi, Nizami, Rumi, Jami, Saadi, Khayyam, and Fuzuli. He also learned Persian by reading these works. Jannati was an active member of the "Majma‘ush-Shu‘ara" literary society and regularly participated in poetic gatherings with young poets of his time, gaining recognition. Throughout his career, he used various pen names, including "Vasif," "Attar," "Hajjarzade," and "Dashkesanoglu," but he became most known by the pen name "Jannati" during the mature phase of his work.

According to researchers studying his manuscript collection, Jannati authored several works on religious and ethical subjects, including the treatise Muhassanat al-Shariat, a didactic work, books on literary theory such as Yanbui al-Hikmat and Tahvil al-Awzan, a three-volume work on ethics, a divan containing approximately six thousand couplets, and a novel titled As-Safar fil-Hazar.

From the early 20th century onward, social and political realities increasingly influenced Jannati's poetry, and his works began to include public and social themes. A significant portion of his poetic output is devoted to the promotion of ideas of freedom and liberty. He is among the first poets to address themes of homeland and nation within the framework of classical poetry—an unusual occurrence for his era, as such themes were rarely articulated within classical literary forms.

Although Soviet literary criticism often classified him among reactionary romantics, several of Jannati's poems were published during his lifetime. Notably, his poem "Demir" ("Iron") appeared in the April 1924 issue of the journal Maarif ve Medeniyet ("Education and Culture"). This poem demonstrates his adherence to his poetic style and reflects a steadfast stance against the revolutionary and ideological pressures of the time. The poem's rhetorical questions invite reflection and enhance its philosophical depth.

Another significant poetic example by Abdulkhalig Jannati is the poem Fakhriyya, which was published under the name "Abdulkhalig Qafarzadeh" in the 24th issue of the Fuyuzat journal on August 7, 1907. This poem generated considerable resonance within the literary community and inspired a number of imitative responses (naziras and takhmises) by various authors. The publication of Fakhriyya in Fuyuzat cannot be considered a coincidental event in the history of Azerbaijani literature.

As noted by Dr. Shamil Valiyev in his monograph The Fuyuzat Literary School, the idea of Turan had previously been perceived in Azerbaijani intellectual circles primarily as an abstract ethical and aesthetic value. However, the Fuyuzat movement transformed this notion by enriching it with political-philosophical dimensions and theoretical grounding. Valiyev emphasizes that the Fuyuzat writers did not view Turan as a mythical land or superstate, but rather as an ideal cultural and spiritual unity of Turkic peoples rooted in real historical geography. This interpretation provides critical context for understanding the ideological significance of Jannati's Fakhriyya.

Nonetheless, the sudden appearance of a poem with such a theme in Fuyuzat was somewhat surprising. Prior to this, clear and unambiguous poetic articulations of the Turan concept were rare in Azerbaijani literature. While Ali bey Huseynzadeh had written a notable quatrain on the subject in the 1890s, it remained unpublished. Therefore, it is unlikely that Jannati was directly influenced by that poem. Furthermore, there is little concrete evidence of similarly ideological poetic works in Fuyuzat or other contemporary publications, making Fakhriyya a distinctive and pioneering example in this regard.Jannati's "Fakhriya" played a crucial role in the consolidation of the Turanist idea in Azerbaijani poetry. It notably inspired Mirza Alakbar Sabir, who composed his own satirical poem titled "Fakhriya" just 22 days later. Published in Molla Nasreddin magazine, Sabir's satire critically examined romantic worldviews and presented Turkic history from a distinct perspective. Sabir's poem not only popularized Jannati's work but also demonstrated alternative artistic and aesthetic interpretations of the Turanist ideology.

Although the influence of Jannati's and Sabir's poems on Turkish literature remains uncertain, it is known that Ziya Gökalp’s "Turan" poem in Turkey followed thereafter.

In his later poetry, Jannati continued to emphasize Turkism, patriotism, Islamism, and the idealized representation of the past. While Turanism is central in "Fakhriya," poems such as "Homeland Anthem," "Pen," "Cannot Compare," and "My Wishes" reflect a continuation of national consciousness and sentiment. In these works, Jannati poetically affirms his loyalty to Turkic identity and national values and expresses commitment to the fate and future of his people. In the poem "To My Dear Friend Mr. Muznib," he venerates serving the nation as a noble and sacred cause with the line, "For the nation, I am ready to be an elixir."

The early 20th century marks a new phase in Jannati's poetic legacy, in which the themes of freedom and liberty take central focus. This is particularly evident in his early poem "Hürriyyət" ("Freedom"), where he calls on the people not to submit to oppression and to struggle for their rights. The socio-political and revolutionary events of the era clearly influenced his worldview and artistic output.

Jannati's numerous poems dedicated to freedom and the liberation of the people do not merely romanticize the ideal; they convey a belief that liberty is maturing and becoming an attainable reality for the people. These themes are clearly manifested in poems such as "Freedom," "Humble People’s Anthem," "Address to Freedom," "Awakening," and "Land," published in various periodicals including Tekamul and Iqbal. In these works, the people's aspiration for freedom harmonizes with the poet's philosophy, affirming his conviction that liberty is not only an artistic ideal but an inevitable socio-political reality.

His poetic works and manuscripts are preserved at the Manuscripts Institute named after Muhammad Fuzuli under the Azerbaijan National Academy of Sciences. The collection comprises seven folders of manuscripts, reflecting his rich poetic imagination and engagement with themes widely resonant among the people.

Concerned with pressing social issues of his time, Jannati also addressed women's rights and emancipation, valuing women as integral members of society deserving equal rights. In his poem "Sual-Cavab" ("Question and Answer"), he criticizes those who regard women as confined to domestic spheres, advocating for women's active participation in social and labor processes.

Furthermore, his quatrains and proverbs also emphasize women's rights and education, highlighting the need to elevate women's societal status and critiquing the harms caused by illiteracy and regressive customs.

Jannati utilized almost all classical poetic forms. Although predominantly composing in the aruz (quantitative) meter, he also wrote poems in syllabic meter. His bayatis are of particular interest as they depart from traditional themes of love, separation, and suffering to engage with social and educational topics such as science, schooling, and women's rights. While his love poetry occasionally includes Persian and Arabic vocabulary, his bayatis are characterized by a simple vernacular style and original expression.

Influenced by folk thinking, Jannati also composed numerous proverbs and aphorisms that reflect his literary ethos.

== Sources ==
- Cənnəti, Əbdülxalıq (2006). Məmməd Adilov (ed.). Vətən təranəsi (in Azerbaijani). Toplayanı: Əlabbas Müznib; Nəşrə hazırlayanlar və ön sözün müəllifləri: Sona Xəyal, Mustafa Mailoğlu. Bakı: Nurlan.
- Abdullayeva, Ülviyyə (2022-05-15). ""Füyuzat"çıların yaradıcılığında Turançılıq ideyasının ictimai və poetik təzahürləri". Filologiya və Sənətşünaslıq (in Azerbaijani) (1): 66–72.
- Əfəndiyev, Timuçin (2019-07-05). "Mürtəce Azərbaycan romantikləri". 525-ci qəzet (in Azerbaijani). p. 10.
- Abdullayeva, Ülviyyə Əli qızı (2024). XX əsrin əvvəllərində Azərbaycan poeziyasında Turançılıq ideyasının bədii inikası (Dissertasiya) (in Azerbaijani). Bakı.
- Qarayev, Nəsrəddin (2012). XIX əsr Azərbaycan ədəbi məclisləri (in Azerbaijani). Bakı: Nurlan. p. 325.
