= Alexander Chalmers' General Biographical Dictionary =

The General Biographical Dictionary was a bestselling book of the early 19th century, compiled by British author Alexander Chalmers. It is the work on which Chalmers' fame as a biographer mainly rests.

== Background ==
The Dictionary was an enlarged edition of the New and General Biographical Dictionary, which was first published in eleven volumes in 1761. Other editions of this compilation appeared in 1784 and in 1798–1810. The latter, in fifteen volumes, was edited (first five) by William Tooke, and (last ten) by Archdeacon Nares and William Beloe. Then Chalmers's edition had as full title The General Biographical Dictionary: containing an historical and critical account of the lives and writings of the most eminent persons in every nation, particularly the British and Irish, from the earliest accounts to the present time. The first four volumes of this work, in octavo, were published monthly, commencing in May 1812, and then a volume appeared every alternate month to the thirty-second and last volume in March 1817, a period of four years and ten months of incessant labour and of many personal privations. The preceding edition of the "Dictionary" was augmented by 3,934 additional lives, and of the remaining number 2,176 were rewritten; while the whole were revised and corrected. The total number of articles exceeds nine thousand. For many years Chalmers was employed by the booksellers in revising and enlarging the "Dictionary"; but at the time of his death only about one-third of the work, as far as the end of the letter D, was ready for the press. Chancellor Christie remarked that "Chalmers's own articles, though not without the merit which characterises a laborious compiler, are too long and tedious for the general reader, and show neither sufficient research nor sufficient accuracy to satisfy the student."

== Sources ==
The Dictionary gives references in footnotes at the end of most articles; Saxii's Onomasticon is the most commonly cited source. There are almost 10,000 separate articles by the second edition of the book; some of them cite the previous dictionary as a reference.

== Reception ==
The book was praised for its comprehensiveness. It had 32 volumes, each of approximately 500 pages, and was considerably larger than the Encyclopædia Britannica. The book served as an inspiration for many other authors who wrote similar books under the same title. These include:

- John Gorton's General Biographical Dictionary
- John Lauris Blake's General Biographical Dictionary

The book was printed several times in many parts of the world.
