= John Lauris Blake's General Biographical Dictionary =

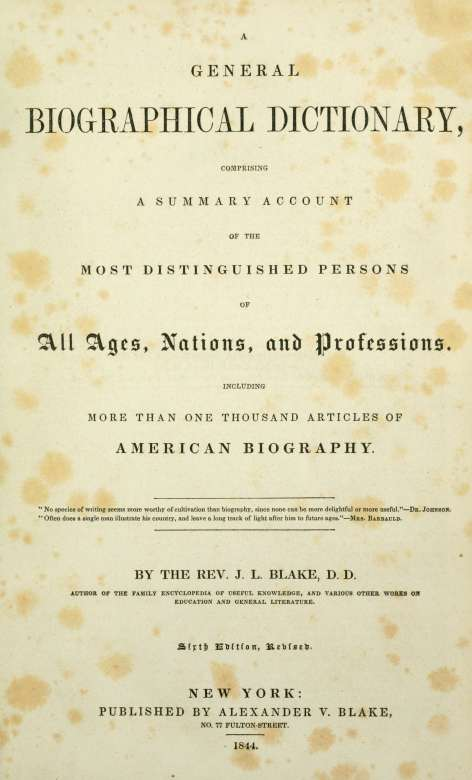
The cover of the first edition of the book.

The General Biographical Dictionary was a book written by American clergyman John Lauris Blake. The book's full title was A General Biographical Dictionary, Comprising a Summary Account of the Most Distinguished Persons of All Ages, Nations and Professions, including more than one thousand articles of American Biography.

== Publication ==
The sixth edition, revised, was published by Alexander V. Blake of 77, Fulton Street, New York City in 1844.

== Reception ==
The book was largely inspired by another book of the same name by a British author, the General Biographical Dictionary of Alexander Chalmers. However unlike Alexander Chalmers' book, John Lauris Blake's book largely focused on American persons and personalities. The book therefore was highly in demand in America in contrast to Chalmers' book which sold well only in Britain.

The book was printed several times and went through several editions. It was also translated into many languages.

The book was commonly found in the homes and libraries of American educators in the 19th century.
