= Who's Who in Nebraska =

1940 Who's Who book

Who's Who in Nebraska, 1940 is a Who's Who book first published by the Nebraska Press Association in Lincoln, Nebraska. According to its "Foreword," the publication includes "life sketches of men and women who have achieved distinction in the fields of economic, civic and cultural endeavor" in the state of Nebraska in 1940. Members of the Nebraska Press Association solicited suggested entries from "Chambers of Commerce, professional organizations, service groups, Nebraskans in every walk of life, newspapers and others." The book comprised 1171 pages and focused on each individual county and a few of the important people in each. The book included approximately 11,000 entries;

In a 1939 meeting, the Nebraska Medical Association voted against endorsing the book project after receiving a request from the Nebraska Press Association.
