= An Oriental Biographical Dictionary =

Biographical dictionary

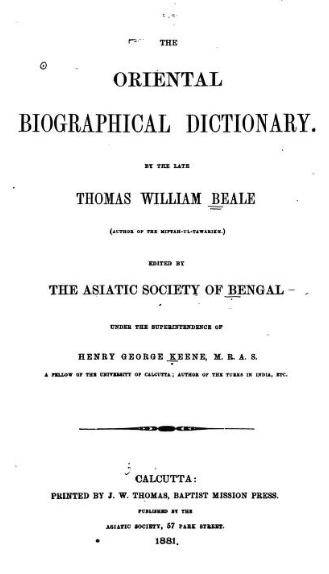
- Title page for The Oriental Biographical Dictionary (1881)
- Author: Thomas William Beale
- Publisher: The Asiatic Society of Bengal
- Publication date: 1881

An Oriental Biographical Dictionary (original title The Oriental Biographical Dictionary) was an important biographical dictionary of the Islamic, Persian and Indian worlds by Thomas William Beale, published posthumously by The Asiatic Society of Bengal in 1881. A new edition, revised and enlarged, was published in London by W. H. Allen in 1894. The book has since been reprinted several times and is now out of copyright. Both editions were edited by Henry Keene, Fellow of the University of Calcutta and a contributor to the Dictionary of National Biography.

Little is known of Beale, other than that he was a clerk in the office of the Board of Revenue of the North West Provinces and evidently a knowledgeable amateur historian. According to Keene's preface to the 1894 edition of the work, Beale had never been in Europe and died at an advanced age in Agra, 1875. He was also the author of a historical work in Persian, مفتاح التواريخ Miftāḥ al-Tavārīkh, published in 1867.

== Editions ==
- The Oriental Biographical Dictionary. By the late Thomas William Beale ... Calcutta: The Asiatic Society of Bengal, 1881. Edited by the Asiatic Society of Bengal, under the superintendence of Henry George Keene.
- An Oriental Biographical Dictionary, Founded on Materials Collected by the late Thomas William Beale ... New edition revised and enlarged. London: W.H. Allen & Co., 1894. Edited by Henry George Keene.

== Bibliography ==
- Lane-Poole, S. (January 1895). "An Oriental Biographical Dictionary by T. W. Beale; H. G. Keene". The English Historical Review. 10 (37): 132–134. JSTOR 548010.
