= Nieuw Nederlandsch Biografisch Woordenboek =

Dutch biographical reference work

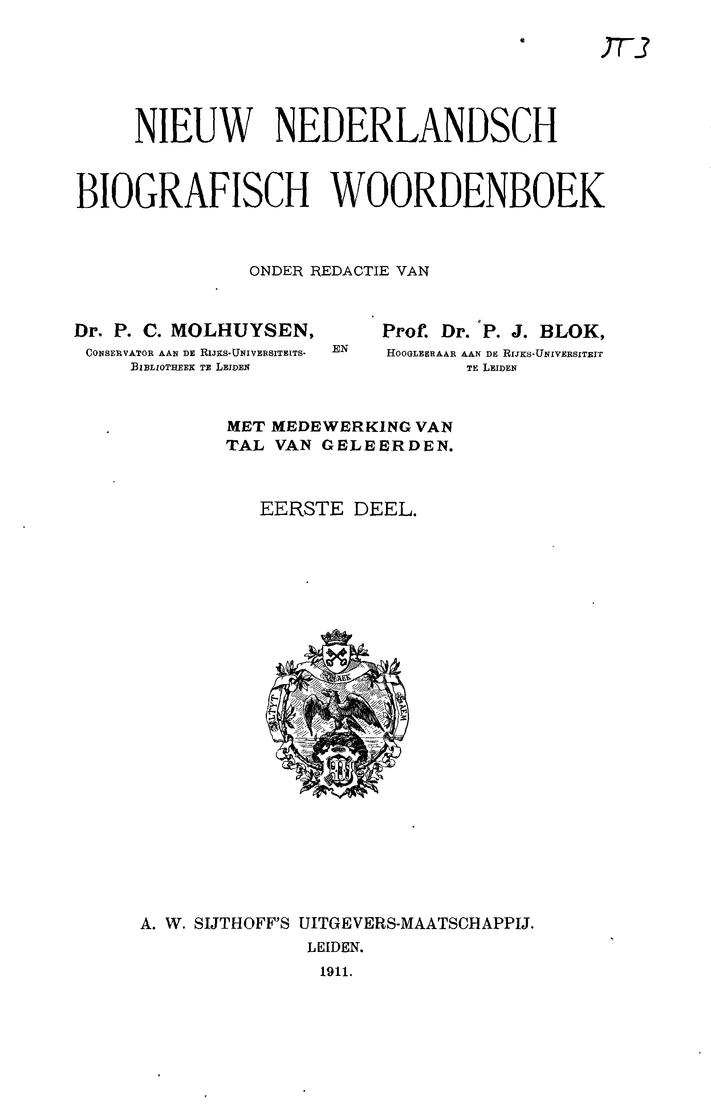
Cover of Nieuw Nederlandsch Biografisch Woordenboek (NNBW), part 1

The Nieuw Nederlandsch Biografisch Woordenboek (NNBW) is a biographical reference work in the Dutch language. It was published in ten parts between 1911 and 1937 by Sijthoff, Leiden, and the editors were P. C. Molhuysen and P. J. Blok. The lexicon contains more than 22,000 short biographies on important or at least notable Dutch people born before 1910. The NNBW was compiled by several hundred historians and other experts. It is considered one of the most important reference works for Dutch history.

It has been digitalised through a collaboration between the Digital Library for Dutch Literature (dbnl) and the Institution for Dutch History (ING), and both organisations have made the NNBW fully available to everyone on their respective sites.

It has been supplemented by the Biografisch Woordenboek van Nederland 1880–2000.
