= Henry George Keene (historian) =

British historian and colonial judge (1826–1915)

Henry George Keene CIE
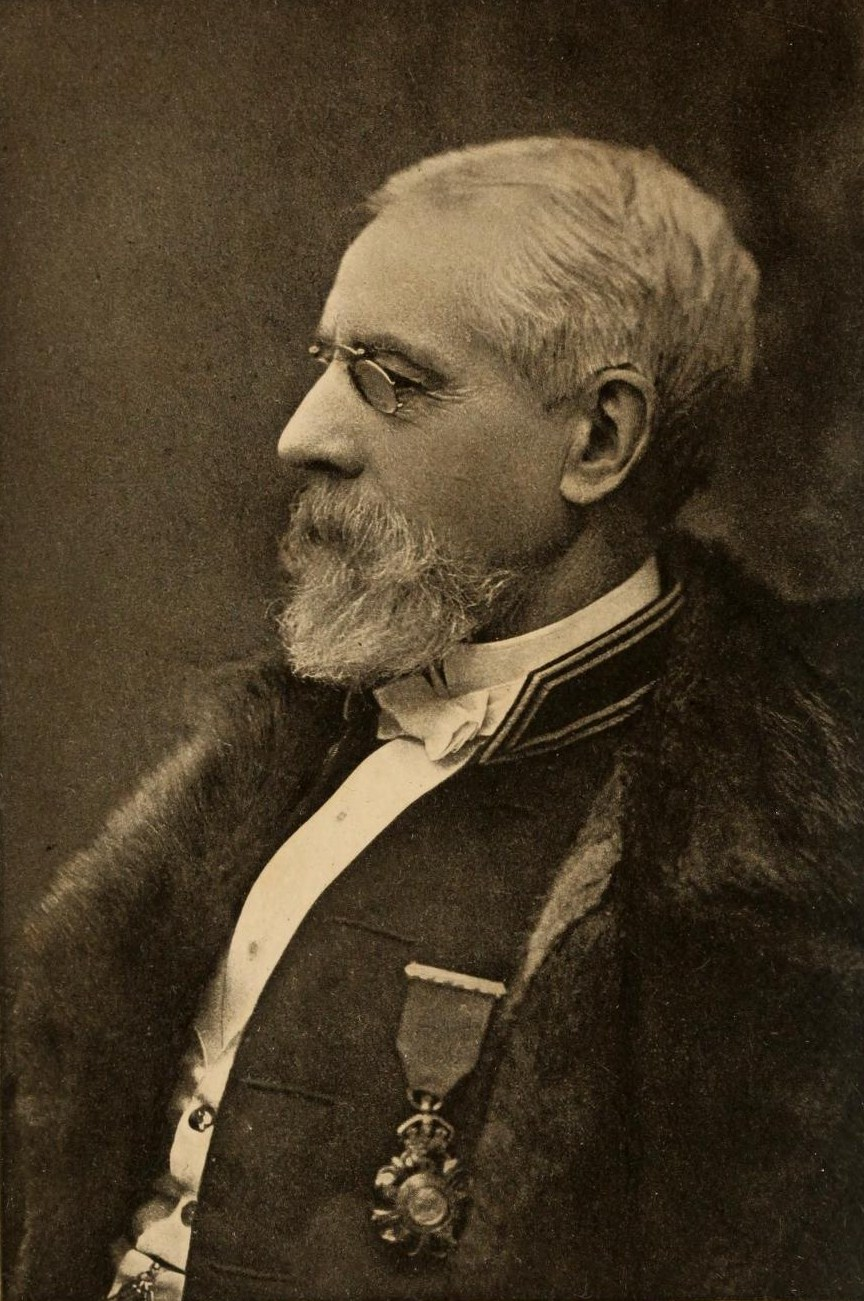
- Born: 1826
- Died: 26 March 1915; Westward Ho!, England, The United Kingdom of Great Britain and Ireland
- Father: Henry George Keene

Henry George Keene CIE (1826 – 26 March 1915) was an English historian of medieval and modern India.

== Life ==
Keene was born at the East India College, Haileybury. Henry George Keene (1781–1864) was his father. He was educated at Rugby School and Wadham College, Oxford, going to India as an East India Company employee in 1847. His career as an official was limited, but he began to write.

From 1847 to 1882 Keene served in the Bengal Civil Service. During the Indian Rebellion of 1857 he was Superintendent at Dehra Doon. In his subsequent service Keene was in frequent disagreement with his superiors, and when he reached the 35 years' limit he had not got beyond the grade of a district and sessions Judge. He retired with the decoration of CIE, and with a literary reputation.

Keene died on 26 March 1915 at his residence in Westward Ho!.

== Works ==
Keene's books included:

- Chabeena. Trivial talk on Indian topics. By a wayfarer (1865), as H. G. K. Contains discussion of John Stuart Mill's justification for British rule.
- Fifty-Seven: some account of the administration in Indian districts during the revolt of the Bengal army (1883)
- A Sketch of the History of Hindustán, from the first Muslim Conquest to the Fall of the Mughol Empire. London: W. H. Allen & Co. (1885)
- The Fall of the Moghal Empire (1886) or The Moghul empire; from the death of Aurungzeb to the overthrow of the Mahratta power
- (ed.) An Oriental Biographical Dictionary, based on materials collected by Thomas William Beale (1894) online; concerned largely with Islamic Indian biographies.
- Servant of "John Company" (1897)
- The Great Anarchy or Darkness before Dawn. Sketches of Military Adventure in Hindustan during the Period immediately preceding British Occupation. London: W. Thaker & Co. (1901).
- History of India Vol. 1: From the Earliest Times to the End of the Nineteenth Century, for the Use of Students and Colleges (1906)
- Here and There: Memories, Indian and Other (1906)
- Hindustan Under Free Lances, 1770-1820: Sketches of Military Adventure in Hindustan (1907)
- Turks in India: Critical Chapters on the Administration of That Country by the Chughtai, Babar, and His Descendants
- St George's Cross - An Episode of Channel Island History
- British Administration During the Revolt of 1857
- Madhava Rao Sindhia and the Hindú reconquest of India

"Keene's Handbooks" covered a number of Indian cities. He also wrote for the Dictionary of National Biography and Chambers's Encyclopaedia.

== Family ==
Keene was twice married, and was survived by four sons and five daughters. Among his sons were:

- Henry George Keene of the Indian Financial Department
- Colonel Alfred Keene, D.S.O., editor of the Journal of the National Service League
- Captain Geoffrey Keene, 29th Punjabis.
