= Emmanuel K. Akyeampong =

Ghanaian historian (born 1962)

Emmanuel Akyeampong
- Born: Emmanuel Kwaku Akyeampong
- Education: University of Ghana; Wake Forest University; University of Virginia
- Occupations: Professor of history and African and African American studies at Harvard University

Emmanuel Kwaku Akyeampong (born 1962) is a professor of history and African and African American studies and the Oppenheimer Faculty Director of the Harvard University Center for African Studies. He is a faculty associate for the Weatherhead Center for International Affairs, a previous board member of the W. E. B. Du Bois Research Institute, and previously held a Harvard College Professorship.

As a former (2002–06) Chair of the Committee on African Studies (now the Center of African Studies), Akyeampong was instrumental, along with Henry Louis Gates Jr. and other faculty members at Harvard, in shaping the Department of African and African American Studies. Akyeampong's research focuses on West African history, Islam in sub-Saharan Africa, disease and medicine, ecology, the African diaspora, political economy, and trade.

Originally from Ghana, Akyeampong earned his B.A. from the University of Ghana in 1984, M.A. in European history from Wake Forest University in 1989, and Ph.D. in African history from the University of Virginia in 1993.
