= Theodore Baker =

American musicologist (1851–1934)

Theodore Baker (June 3, 1851 – October 12, 1934) was an American musicologist.

== Biography ==
Born June 3, 1851, in New York City, Baker's early education occurred there and in Boston. He studied business but turned to music as a career, becoming an organist in Concord, Massachusetts. In 1874, he moved to Leipzig, Germany where he studied with Oscar Paul. He attended Leipzig Conservatory beginning in 1878 where he was awarded a doctorate in 1881. His dissertation, published in 1882 as Über die Musik der nordamerikanischen Wilden (On the music of the North American Indians), dealt with the music of the Seneca Indians, and was the first major work published on the music of American Indians. (Themes included in the work were used by Edward MacDowell in his Indian Suite.) The material for his book was a result of Baker's living with the Seneca tribe in New York State, where he was initiated as a member of the tribe and thus had incomparable access to resources for the study of their songs and dances.

In 1890, Baker returned to the United States. In 1892, he became literary editor for the music publisher G. Schirmer, a job he held until 1926. During his tenure he translated a considerable body of books and libretti into English, and wrote often in the Musical Quarterly, a Schirmer publication.

He published Baker's Dictionary of Musical Terms (1895) and most notably, Baker's Biographical Dictionary of Musicians (1900), which was revised after his death by Nicolas Slonimsky and then Laura Kuhn; as of 2007 is in its ninth edition. He translated Oscar Paul's A Manual of Harmony For Use in Music-Schools and Seminaries and For Self-Instruction (1885) and numerous other works published by Schirmer.

After his retirement in 1926, Baker moved with his wife to Germany due to his wife's ill health. They made their home in Leipzig at the American Consulate. She predeceased him on September 3, 1934. He died on October 13, 1934, aged 83, at Dr. Teuscher's Sanatorium, in Dresden.

== Notes ==
- Baker, Theodore. Über die Musik der nordamerikanischen Wilden. Leipzig: Breitkopf & Härtel, 1882.
- Baker, Theodore. On the Music of the North American Indians. Reprint with translation. New York: Da Capo Press, 1977. ISBN 9780306708886
- "Dr. Theodore Baker," Musical Courier (Nov. 3, 1934), p. 20.
- "Passed Away," Musical America (Nov. 10, 1934), p. 32.
- H. Wiley Hitchcock, "Theodore Baker". The New Grove Dictionary of Music and Musicians (access through subscription).
- Stanley Sadie, ed. The New Grove Dictionary of Music and Musicians, Volume 2, p. 45-6 (1980)
