= John Gorton's General Biographical Dictionary =

19th century British book

The General Biographical Dictionary is a book by British author John Gorton. The first edition was published in two volumes in 1828, with an appendix. A new edition that brought the work current as far as 1850 was published in four volumes in 1851. This edition featured a supplement by Cyrus Redding. It "is compiled from rather obvious sources of information". It "has an extended Life of Athanasius, well drawn up". It has been called "valuable".

One-third of the biographies were written by Richard Harris Barham.

The book was one among several books of similar name that were available in the 19th century.
