= Biographical dictionary =

Type of encyclopedic dictionary limited to biographical information

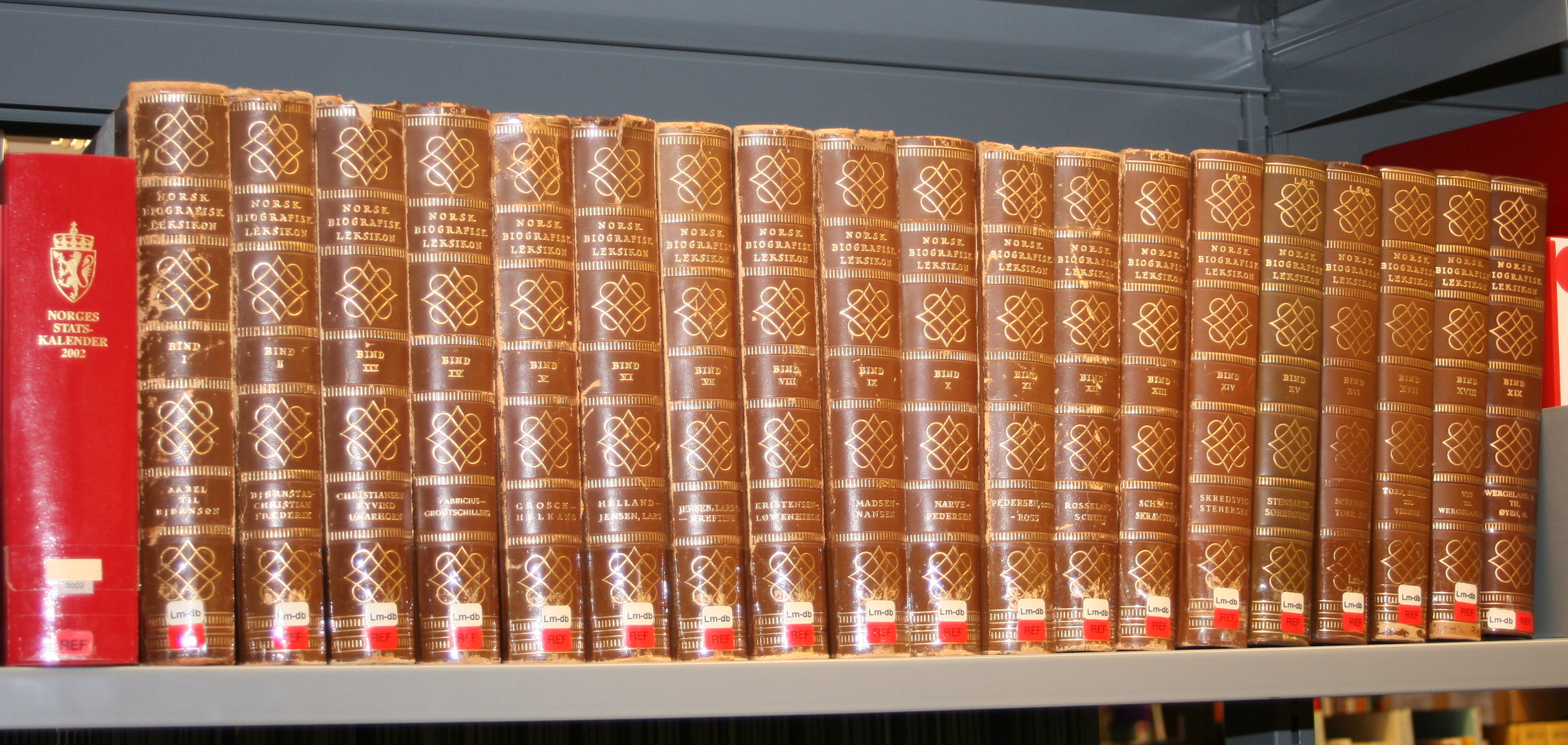
Norsk biografisk leksikon (19 volumes)

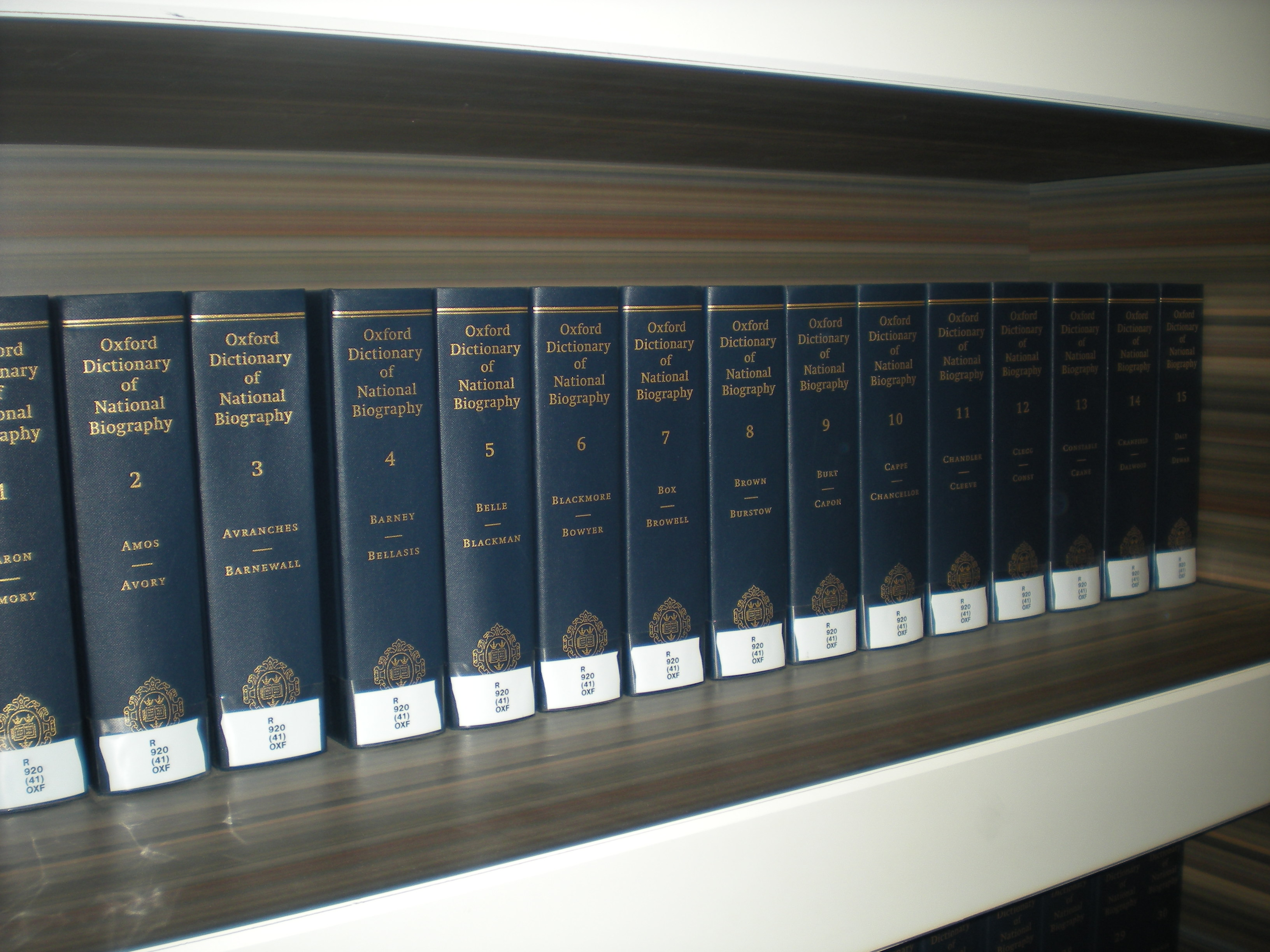
Oxford Dictionary of National Biography

A biographical dictionary is a type of encyclopedic dictionary limited to biographical information. Many attempt to cover the major personalities of a country (with limitations, such as living persons only, in Who's Who, or deceased people only, in the Dictionary of National Biography). Others are specialized, in that they cover important names in a subject field, such as architecture or engineering.

== History ==
=== Islamic civilization ===
Although various form of biographical compendiums and collections have occupied a prominent place within many culture's histories, (Note: See further: Biography#Historical_biography) biographical dictionaries have been particularly important within the Islamic literary tradition, with Tarif Khalidi going so far as to call the genre a "unique product of Arab Muslim culture".

Early examples of Islamic biographical dictionaries back date back to 9th-century Iraq, and by the 16th-century the genre was a firmly established and well-respected form of historical writing. Many of these Islamic biographical dictionaries are notable for containing more social data for a large segment of the population than other works of that period, making them useful for historical research. While the earliest biographical dictionaries focused on the lives of the prophets of Islam and their companions, with one of the earliest examples being The Book of The Major Classes by Ibn Sa'd al-Baghdadi, later dictionaries would begin to document the lives of many other historical figures (from rulers to scholars) who lived in the medieval Islamic world as well. The largest known biographical dictionary ever produced within the medieval Islamic tradition is called History of Damascus authored by a Muslim historian Ibn Asakir.

Regarding the scope of Islamic biographical dictionaries, American scholar of Islam Richard Bulliet argues that "a brief look at Brockelmann's Geschichte der Arabischen Litteratur is sufficient to convince anyone that the number of individual biographies extant must run into the hundreds of thousands and most likely into the millions."

== See also ==
- List of biographical dictionaries
