= Bibliography of encyclopedias: general biographies =

List of biographical dictionaries and encyclopedias

This is a list of encyclopedias and encyclopedic/biographical dictionaries on general biographies in any language. Entries are in the English language except where noted.

== General ==
- Almanac of famous people. Gale Research, Inc., 1989-. ISSN 1040-127X.
- Anderson, Gerald H. (1999). Biographical Dictionary of Christian Missions. Wm. B. Eerdmans Publishing. ISBN 978-0-8028-4680-8.
- Arnim, Max, Preussische Staatsbibliothek. Internationale Personalbibliographie, 1800–1943. K.W. Hiersemann, 1944–1952.
- Biographical dictionary. S9.com, 1996. Available online here.
- Biographie univrselle (Michaud) (in French) (Nouv. ed.). Paris: Mme. C. Desplaces. 1843–1865.
- Biography in context. Gale Group, 2002-. Available online here.
- Bourne, J. M. Who's who in World War One. Routledge, 2001. ISBN 0415141796.
- Brennan, Elizabeth A., Elizabeth C. Clarage, Seymour Topping. Who's who of Pulitzer Prize winners. Oryx Press, 1999. ISBN 1573561118.
- Burnett, John, David Vincent, David Mayall. The autobiography of the working class: An annotated, critical bibliography. New York University Press, 1984–1989. ISBN 0814710719.
- Cannon, John Ashton. The Blackwell dictionary of historians. Blackwell Reference, 1988. ISBN 063114708X.
- Chambers, ed., Joan Bakewell, introduction: Chambers Biographical Dictionary, 9th edition, 2011, Chambers, 1,278 pages. ISBN 978-0-550-10693-3. Short descriptions of 18,000 people from Britain and the rest of the world.
- Cohn-Sherbok, Dan. The dictionary of Jewish biography. Oxford University Press, 2005. ISBN 0195223918.
- Contemporary black biography. Gale Research Inc., 1992–. ISSN 1058-1316.
- Cooper, Thompson (1890). Biographical Dictionary. Bell.
- Cousin, John W. (1 March 2003). A Short Biographical Dictionary of English Literature. Kessinger Publishing. ISBN 978-0-7661-4348-7.
- Crystal, David. The Cambridge biographical encyclopedia. Cambridge University Press, 1998. ISBN 0521630991.
- Current biography illustrated. EBSCO Publishing. Available online here.
- Editors of the American Heritage Dictionaries (15 July 2003). The Houghton Mifflin Dictionary of Biography. Houghton Mifflin Harcourt. ISBN 978-0-618-25210-7.
- Encyclopedia of world biography. Gale Research, 1998-[2012]. ISBN 9780787622213. ISSN 1099-7326.
- Europa Publications Limited. World Who's Who. Routledge, 2007-. Available online here.
- Gorton, John (1851). A General Biographical Dictionary. Whittaker and co.
- Great lives from history. Salem Press, 2004–. ISBN 1587651521.
- Haan, Francisca de, Krasimira Daskalova, Anna Loutfi. Biographical dictionary of women's movements and feminisms in Central, Eastern, and South Eastern Europe: 19th and 20th centuries. CEU Press/Central European University Press, 2006. ISBN 9789637326394.
- Hale, Sarah Josepha Buell, ed. Woman's record; or, Sketches of all distinguished women, from "the beginning" till A.D. 1850. Arranged in four eras. With selections from female writers of every age. New York: Harper & Brothers (1853), public domain
- Jöcher, Christian Gottlieb. Allgemeines Gelehrten-Lexicon. Johann Friedrich Gleditschens Buchhandlung, 1750–1751.
- Kuehl, Warren F. Biographical dictionary of internationalists. Greenwood Press, 1983. ISBN 0313221294.
- A New and General Biographical Dictionary. Strahan. 1784.
- Jaumann, Herbert. Handbuch gelehrtenkultur der frühen neuzeit. W. de Gruyter, 2004–2005. ISBN 3110160692.
- Jocher, Christian Gottlieb (1750–1751). Allgemeines Gelehrten-Lexikon (in German). Leipzig: Gleditsch.
- Jocher, Christian Gottlieb (1784–1787). Fortsetzung und Erganzungen ... (in German). Leipzig: Selbstverlag der Deutschen Gesellschaft.
- Jones, Barry (2017). Dictionary of World Biography (4 ed.). Acton, A.C.T., Australia: ANU Press. doi:10.22459/DWB.05.2017. ISBN 978-1-76046-126-3.
- Jones, Stephen (1802). A new biographical dictionary: containing a brief account of the lives and writings of the most eminent persons and remarkable characters in every age and nation. Printed by T. Bensley for G. and J. Robinson.
- Khallikān, Ibn (1871). Ibn Khallikan's biographical dictionary. Printed for the Oriental translation fund of Great Britain and Ireland.
- Kramme, U., Ž. Urra Muena. Arab-Islamic biographical archive (AIBA). K. G. Saur, 1994–2002. ISBN 3598338953.
- Lazell, Barry, ed. with Dafydd Rees and Luke Crampton, Rock Movers and Shakers: An A to Z of the People Who Made Rock Happen, Billboard Publications, Inc., New York, 1989
- Lorenz, Clare, Women in Architecture: a contemporary perspective, Rizzoli, New York, 1990
- MacKay, James, The Dictionary of Sculptors in Bronze, Antique Collectors Club, Woodbridge, Suffolk, 1977
- Magill, Frank N. (23 January 2003). Dictionary of World Biography: The Ancient World. Taylor & Francis. ISBN 978-1-57958-040-7.
- Marquis biographies online. Marquis Who's Who, 1985-. Available here.
- Marquis Who's Who. Who's who in the world. Marquis Who's Who, 1971-.
- Marquis Who's Who. Who's who of emerging leaders. Marquis Who's Who, 2006-.
- Merriam-Webster's biographical dictionary. Merriam-Webster. 1995. ISBN 978-0-87779-743-2.
- Naylor, Colin, Contemporary Artists, St. James Press, Chicago and London, 1989
- Nobel Foundation. Nobelprize.org. Nobel Web AB. Available online here.
- Nouvelle biographie generale (in French). Paris: Firmin Didot. 1853–1866.
- Oettinger, Eduard Maria, ed. (1869–1882). Moniteur des dates (in German). Leipzig: Denicke, Hermann.
- Ogilvie, Marilyn; Harvey, Joy (6 July 2000). The Biographical Dictionary of Women in Science: Pioneering Lives From Ancient Times to the Mid-20th Century. Taylor & Francis US. ISBN 978-0-415-92038-4.
- ProQuest obituaries. ProQuest, 1999?-. Available online here.
- Randel, Don Michael (1996). The Harvard Biographical Dictionary of Music. Harvard University Press. ISBN 978-0-674-37299-3.
- Richards, J.M., ed, Adolf K. Placzek, American Consultant, Who’s Who in Architecture from 1400 to the present, Holt, Rinehart and Winston, New York, 1977
- Rollyson, Carl E. Biography: An annotated bibliography. Salem Press, 1992. ISBN 0893566780.
- Saur Verlag, K. G. World biographical information system online. De Gruyter Saur, 2004-. Available online here.
- Schellinger, Paul E. St. James guide to biography. St. James Press, 1991. ISBN 1558621466.
- Sheehy, Noel (30 July 2002). Biographical Dictionary of Psychology. Taylor & Francis. ISBN 978-0-415-28561-2.
- Sherby, Louise S., Wilhelm Odelberg. The who's who of Nobel Prize winners, 1901–2000. Oryx Press, 2002. ISBN 1573564141.
- Slcoum, Robert B. Biographical dictionaries and related works: An international bibliography of more than 16,000 collective biographies . . . Gale Research, 1986. ISBN 0810302438.
- Smith, Bonnie G. The Oxford encyclopedia of women in world history. Oxford University Press, 2008.
- Televski, Nick, Knocking On Heaven’s Door: Rock Obituaries, Omnibus Press, London 2006
- Thomas, Joseph (30 March 2010). The Universal Dictionary of Biography and Mythology. Cosimo, Inc. ISBN 978-1-61640-068-2.
- Union of International Associations. Yearbook of international organizations online. Union of International Associations, 2000-. Available online here.
- Varpreau, Gustave (1893). Dictionnaire universel des contemporains contenant toutes les personnes notables de la France et des pays etrangers... (in French). Paris: Hachette.
- Vernoff, Edward, Rima Shore. The Penguin international dictionary of contemporary biography: From 1900 to the present. Penguin Reference, 2001. ISBN 0670894702.
- Who's who in world Jewry. Pitman, 1955–1988. ISSN 0511-9138.

== Regional ==
=== Africa ===
- The Africa Centre. Africa contemporary database. The Africa Centre, 2001. Available online here.
- African studies. Columbia University, 1999-. Available online here.
- Appiah, Anthony, Henry Louis Gates. Africana: The encyclopedia of the African and African American experience. Oxford University Press, 2005. ISBN 0195170555.
- Cook, Chris. The making of modern Africa: A guide to archives. Facts on File, 1995. ISBN 081602071X.
- Julien, Charles André. Les Africains. Éditions J. A., 1977. ISBN 2852580446.
- Lipschutz, Mark R., R. Kent Rasmussen. Dictionary of African historical biography. University of California Press, 1986. ISBN 0520051793.
- Makers of modern Africa. Africa Journal for Africa Books, 1981–1996. ISSN 0261-1570.
- McIlwaine, John. Africa: A guide to reference material. Hans Zell, 2007. ISBN 9780954102937.
- Mediavilla, Victor Herrero, K. G. Saur Verlag. African biographical archive. K. G. Saur Verlag, 1994–1997. ISBN 978-3-598-33128-2.
- Núnẽz, Benjamín. Dictionary of Portuguese-African civilization. Hans Zell, 1995–1996. ISBN 1873836104.
- Shavit, David. The United States in Africa: A historical dictionary. Greenwood Press, 1989. ISBN 0313258872.
- Weidmann, Conrad. Deutsche männer in Afrika: Lexicon der hervorragensten deutschen Afrika-forscher, missionare, etc. B. Nöhring, 1894.

==== Central Africa ====
- Brockman, Norbert C. An African biographical dictionary. Grey House Publ., 2006. ISBN 1592371124.
- Sheldon, Kathleen E. Historical dictionary of women in sub-Saharan Africa. Scarecrow Press, 2005. ISBN 0810853310.

===== Angola =====
- Núnẽz, Benjamín. Dictionary of Portuguese-African civilization. Hans Zell, 1995–1996. ISBN 1873836104.

===== Cameroon =====
- Echu, George. Who's who au Cameroun: recueil biographique des personnalités du Cameroun. Africana Publications. ISBN 9789956574032.

===== Chad =====
- Rouvreur, Albert Le, Paule Deville, Joseph Tubiana. Eléments pour un dictionnaire biographique du Tchad et du Niger (Téda et Daza). Editions du Centre National de la Recherche Scientifique, 1978. ISBN 2222022290.

===== Democratic Republic of the Congo =====
- Kindulu, Joseph-Roger Mazanza, Cornelis Nlandu-Tsasa. Les nouveaux cadres congolais: Figures d'aujourd'hui et de demain. Harmattan, 2005. ISBN 274758125X.

==== East Africa ====
- Brockman, Norbert C. An African biographical dictionary. Grey House Publ., 2006. ISBN 1592371124.
- Sheldon, Kathleen E. Historical dictionary of women in sub-Saharan Africa. Scarecrow Press, 2005. ISBN 0810853310.

===== Comoros =====
- Jérôme, Daniel Trinquet. 1000 célébrités de la Réunion et les 150 personnalités des îles de l'océan Indien. Dicorphie, 2009. ISBN 9782877635400. ISBN 2877635406. (French).

===== Kenya =====
- Who is who in Kenya. Africa Book Services, 1982–1983.

===== Madagascar =====
- Cornevin, Robert, Jacques Serre, Académie des sciences d'outre-mer. Hommes et destins: Dictionnaire biographique d'outre-mer. Académie des sciences d'outre-mer, 1975–2011. ISBN 2900098033.

===== Mauritius =====
- Who's Who of Southern Africa. Johannesburg: Wootton & Gibson. 1907.

===== Mozambique =====
- Ferreira, Alexandre A. Moçambique, 1489–1975. Prefácio-Edição de Livros e Revistas, Lda, [2007]. ISBN 9789898022042. (Portuguese)
- Núnẽz, Benjamín. Dictionary of Portuguese-African civilization. Hans Zell, 1995–1996. ISBN 1873836104.

===== Réunion =====
- Jérôme, Daniel Trinquet. 1000 célébrités de la Réunion et les 150 personnalités des îles de l'océan Indien. Dicorphie, 2009. ISBN 9782877635400. ISBN 2877635406. (French).

===== Seychelles =====
- Jérôme, Daniel Trinquet. 1000 célébrités de la Réunion et les 150 personnalités des îles de l'océan Indien. Dicorphie, 2009. ISBN 9782877635400. ISBN 2877635406. (French).
- Mancham, James R. Seychelles: Personalities of yesterday. Mahe Publications, 2005. ISBN 9789993180050.

===== Sudan =====
- Hill, Richard (1 May 1967). A Biographical Dictionary of the Sudan. Psychology Press. ISBN 978-0-7146-1037-5.

===== Uganda =====
- Who's who in Uganda. Fountain, 1994. ISBN 9970020277.

==== Horn of Africa ====
- Bidwell, Robin. Arabian personalities of the early twentieth century. Oleander Press, 1986. ISBN 0906672392.
- Brockman, Norbert C. An African biographical dictionary. Grey House Publ., 2006. ISBN 1592371124.
- Sheldon, Kathleen E. Historical dictionary of women in sub-Saharan Africa. Scarecrow Press, 2005. ISBN 0810853310.

===== Ethiopia =====
- Belaynesh, Michael, Stanislaw Chojnacki, Richard Pankhurst. The Dictionary of Ethiopian biography. Institute of Ethiopian Studies, Addis Ababa University, 1975–.

==== North Africa ====
- Bidwell, Robin. Arabian personalities of the early twentieth century. Oleander Press, 1986. ISBN 0906672392.
- Fischbach, Michael R. Biographical encyclopedia of the modern Middle East and North Africa. Gale Group, 2008. ISBN 9781414418896.
- Kramme, U., Z. Urra Muena. Arab-Islamic biographical archive (AIBA). K. G. Saur, 1994–2002. ISBN 3598338953.

===== Egypt =====
- David, A. Rosalie, Antony E. David. A biographical dictionary of ancient Egypt. Seaby, 1992. ISBN 1852640324.
- Goldschmidt, Arthur (2000). Biographical Dictionary of Modern Egypt. Lynne Rienner Publishers. ISBN 978-1-55587-229-8.
- Leick, Gwendolyn. Who's who in the Ancient Near East. Routledge, 1999. ISBN 0415132304.
- Rice, Michael. Who's who in ancient Egypt. Routledge, 1999. ISBN 0415154480.
- Shimoni, Yaacov. The Biographical dictionary of the Middle East. Facts on File, 1991. ISBN 0816024588.
- Ummah Briss lil-Iʻlām wa-al-Nashr. Who's who in Egypt. Ummah Press Service, 1995–.

===== Morocco =====
- Who's who in Morocco. S.l.: Editions Media C.O.P.E., 1998–2001.

===== Sudan =====
- Hill, Richard (1 May 1967). A Biographical Dictionary of the Sudan. Psychology Press. ISBN 978-0-7146-1037-5.

===== Tunisia =====
- Clausen, Ursel. Tunisie: Notes biographiques. Deutsches Orient-Institut, 1976.
- Zmerli, Sadok, Ḥammādī Sāḥilī. Figures tunisiennes. Dar al-Gharb al-Islami, 1993.

==== Southern Africa ====
- Brockman, Norbert C. An African biographical dictionary. Grey House Publ., 2006. ISBN 1592371124.
- Rosenthal, Eric. Southern African dictionary of national biography. Warne, [1966].
- Sheldon, Kathleen E. Historical dictionary of women in sub-Saharan Africa. Scarecrow Press, 2005. ISBN 0810853310.
- Who's who of southern Africa. Who's Who of Southern Africa, 2007-. Available online here.

===== Botswana =====
- Rosenthal, Eric. Southern African dictionary of national biography. Warne, [1966].

===== Comoros =====
- Jérôme, Daniel Trinquet. 1000 célébrités de la Réunion et les 150 personnalités des îles de l'océan Indien. Dicorphie, 2009. ISBN 9782877635400. ISBN 2877635406. (French).

===== Lesotho =====
- Rosenthal, Eric. Southern African dictionary of national biography. Warne, [1966].

===== Malawi =====
- M'Passou, Denis, Mary C. Piringu. Who is who of Malawi. Spot Publications, 1995. ISBN 0797806857.
- Rosenthal, Eric. Southern African dictionary of national biography. Warne, [1966].

===== Mozambique =====
- Ferreira, Alexandre A. Moçambique, 1489–1975. Prefácio-Edição de Livros e Revistas, Lda, [2007]. ISBN 9789898022042. (Portuguese)
- Rosenthal, Eric. Southern African dictionary of national biography. Warne, [1966].

===== Namibia =====
- Rosenthal, Eric. Southern African dictionary of national biography. Warne, [1966].
- Who's Who of Southern Africa. Johannesburg: Wootton & Gibson. 1907.

===== Réunion =====
- Jérôme, Daniel Trinquet. 1000 célébrités de la Réunion et les 150 personnalités des îles de l'océan Indien. Dicorphie, 2009. ISBN 9782877635400. ISBN 2877635406. (French).

===== Seychelles =====
- Jérôme, Daniel Trinquet. 1000 célébrités de la Réunion et les 150 personnalités des îles de l'océan Indien. Dicorphie, 2009. ISBN 9782877635400. ISBN 2877635406. (French).

===== South Africa =====
- Brockman, Norbert C. An African biographical dictionary. Grey House Publ., 2006. ISBN 1592371124.
- Joyce, Peter. A concise dictionary of South African biography. Francolin, 1999. ISBN 1868590372.
- National Council for Social Research (South Africa). Dictionary of South African biography. Nasional Boekhandel Bpk. for National Council for Social Research, Dept. of Higher Education, 1968–1987.
- Rosenthal, Eric. Southern African dictionary of national biography. Warne, [1966].
- Verwey, E. J. (1999). New Dictionary of South African Biography. HSRC Press. ISBN 978-0-7969-1648-8.
- Who's Who of Southern Africa. Johannesburg: Wootton & Gibson. 1907.

===== Swaziland =====
- Jones, Huw M. A biographical register of Swaziland to 1902. University of Natal Press, 1993. ISBN 086980880X.
- Rosenthal, Eric. Southern African dictionary of national biography. Warne, [1966].

===== Zambia =====
- Rosenthal, Eric. Southern African dictionary of national biography. Warne, [1966].

===== Zimbabwe =====
- Baxter, T. W., Eric Edward Burke. Guide to the historical manuscripts in the National Archives of Rhodesia. National Archives of Rhodesia, 1970.
- Rosenthal, Eric. Southern African dictionary of national biography. Warne, [1966].
- Taber, Edward C. Pioneers of Rhodesia. C. Struik, 1966.
- Who's who in Zimbabwe. Roblaw, 1992–[1994?].
- Who's Who of Southern Africa. Johannesburg: Wootton & Gibson. 1907.

==== West Africa ====
- Sheldon, Kathleen E. Historical dictionary of women in sub-Saharan Africa. Scarecrow Press, 2005. ISBN 0810853310.

===== Benin =====
- Institut de recherches appliquées du Dahomey. Dictionnaire bio-bibliographique du Dahomey. I.R.A.D., 1969. ISSN 0420-0438.

===== Cape Verde =====
- Núnẽz, Benjamín. Dictionary of Portuguese-African civilization. Hans Zell, 1995–1996. ISBN 1873836104.

===== Guinea-Bissau =====
- Núnẽz, Benjamín. Dictionary of Portuguese-African civilization. Hans Zell, 1995–1996. ISBN 1873836104.

===== Mali =====
- Ba, Adam Konaré. Dictionnaire des femmes célèbres du Mali: Des temps mythico-légendaires au 26 mars 1991. Editions Jamana, 1993. DEWEY 920.72096623.

===== Niger =====
- Rouvreur, Albert Le, Paule Deville, Joseph Tubiana. Eléments pour un dictionnaire biographique du Tchad et du Niger (Téda et Daza). Editions du Centre National de la Recherche Scientifique, 1978. ISBN 2222022290.

===== Nigeria =====
- Ishaka, Peter. Who's who in Nigeria. NIBC, 2003. ISBN 9783446630.

===== São Tomé and Príncipe =====
- Núnẽz, Benjamín. Dictionary of Portuguese-African civilization. Hans Zell, 1995–1996. ISBN 1873836104.

===== Sierra Leone =====
- Who's who in Sierra Leone. Lyns Publicity, 1981.

=== Americas ===
- Appiah, Anthony, Henry Louis Gates. Africana: The encyclopedia of the African and African American experience. Oxford University Press, 2005. ISBN 0195170555.
- Farris, Phoebe. Women artists of color: A bio-critical sourcebook to 20th century artists in the Americas. Greenwood Press, 1999. ISBN 0313303746.

==== Caribbean ====
- Contemporary Hispanic biography: profiles from the international Hispanic community. Gale, 2002–. ISSN 1541-1524.
- Covington, Paula Hattox, David Block. Latin America and the Caribbean: A critical guide to research sources. Greenwood Press, 1992. ISBN 0313264031.
- Henderson, James D., Helen Delpar, Maurice Philip Brungardt. A reference guide to Latin American history. M. E. Sharpe, 2000. ISBN 1563247445.
- Marting, Diane E. Women writers of Spanish America: An annotated bio-bibliographical guide. Greenwood Press, 1987. ISBN 0313249695.
- Mendez Mendez, Serafín, Gail Cueto. Notable Caribbeans and Caribbean Americans: A biographical dictionary. Greenwood Press, 2003. ISBN 0313314438.
- Shavit, David. The United States in Latin America: A historical dictionary. Greenwood Press, 1992. ISBN 0313275955.
- Who's who in Latin America: Government, politics, banking and industry. Norman Ross, 1993–1997. ISSN 1068-7696.

===== Cuba =====
- Alfonso, Pablo M., Partido Comunista de Cuba. Los fieles de Castro. Ediciones Cambio, 1991. ISBN 096317360X.
- Calcagno, Francisco. Diccionario biográfico cubano. N. Ponce de Leon, 1878–1886.
- Catony, Leonardo Depestre, Luis Ubeda Garrido. Personalidades cubanas: Siglo XX. Editorial de Ciencias Sociales, 2002. ISBN 9789590604485.
- Maratos, Daniel C., Marnesba D. Hill. Escritores de la diáspora cubana: Manual biobibliográfica or Cuban exile writers: A biobibliographic handbook. Scarecrow Press, 1986. ISBN 0810818787.
- Mediavilla, Victor Herrero, L. Rosa Aguayo Nayle. Archivo biográfico de España, Portugal e Iberoamérica. New York: K. G. Saur, 1990. ISBN 3598320469.
- Meier, Matt S., Conchita Franco Serri, Richard A. Garcia. Notable Latino Americans: A biographical dictionary. Greenwood Press, 1997. ISBN 058538908X.
- Sarausa, Fermín Peraza. Diccionario biográfico cubano. Ediciones Anuario Bibliográfico Cubano, 1951–1968.

===== Dominican Republic =====
- Clase, Pablo. 50 biografías de figuras dominicanas. Libreros Dominicanos Unidos, 1990.
- Mediavilla, Victor Herrero, L. Rosa Aguayo Nayle. Archivo biográfico de España, Portugal e Iberoamérica. New York: K. G. Saur, 1990. ISBN 3598320469.
- Vásquez, Pedro R. 150 dominicanos notables. Ediciones Librería La Trinitaria, 2002. ISBN 9993439150.

===== Haiti =====
- Pascal-Trouillot, Ertha, Ertha Trouillot. Encyclopédie biographique d'Haiti. Éditions SEMIS, 2001. ISBN 2922454061.
- Supplice, Daniel. Dictionnaire biographique des personnalités politiques de la République d'Haïti, 1804–2001. D. Supplice, 2001. ISBN 9993562300.

===== Puerto Rico =====
- Mediavilla, Victor Herrero, L. Rosa Aguayo Nayle. Archivo biográfico de España, Portugal e Iberoamérica. New York: K. G. Saur, 1990. ISBN 3598320469.
- Meier, Matt S., Conchita Franco Serri, Richard A. Garcia. Notable Latino Americans: A biographical dictionary. Greenwood Press, 1997. ISBN 058538908X.
- Sarramía, Tomás. Figuras de Puerto Rico: Apuntes y datos biográficos. Publicaciones Puertorriqueñas Editores, 2001. ISBN 0929441141.

===== Trinidad and Tobago =====
- Murray, Eric John. National biography handbook of Trinidad and Tobago: With a memoir of his excellency Noor Mohamed Hassanali, T. C., president and commander-in-chief of the Republic of Trinidad and Tobago. E. J. Murray, 1996. ISBN 9768157119.

==== Central America ====
- Arellano, Jorge Eduardo. Literatura centroamericana: Diccionario de autores contemporáneos; Fuentes para su estudio. Fundación Vida, 2003. ISBN 9992453125.
- Contemporary Hispanic biography: profiles from the international Hispanic community. Gale, 2002–. ISSN 1541-1524.
- Covington, Paula Hattox, David Block. Latin America and the Caribbean: A critical guide to research sources. Greenwood Press, 1992. ISBN 0313264031.
- Henderson, James D., Helen Delpar, Maurice Philip Brungardt. A reference guide to Latin American history. M. E. Sharpe, 2000. ISBN 1563247445.
- Marting, Diane E. Women writers of Spanish America: An annotated bio-bibliographical guide. Greenwood Press, 1987. ISBN 0313249695.
- Shavit, David. The United States in Latin America: A historical dictionary. Greenwood Press, 1992. ISBN 0313275955.
- Who's who in Latin America: Government, politics, banking and industry. Norman Ross, 1993–1997. ISSN 1068-7696.

===== Costa Rica =====
- Mediavilla, Victor Herrero, L. Rosa Aguayo Nayle. Archivo biográfico de España, Portugal e Iberoamérica. New York: K. G. Saur, 1990. ISBN 3598320469.
- Zeledón C., Elias, Yadira Calvo Fajardo. Surcos de lucha: Libro biográfico, histórico y gráfico de la mujer costarricense. Instituto de Estudios de la Mujer, Universidad Nacional, 1997. ISBN 9968983209.

===== El Salvador =====
- Mediavilla, Victor Herrero, L. Rosa Aguayo Nayle. Archivo biográfico de España, Portugal e Iberoamérica. New York: K. G. Saur, 1990. ISBN 3598320469.

===== Guatemala =====
- Lima, Flavio Rojas. Diccionario histórico biográfico de Guatemala. Fundación para la Cultura y el Desarrollo, Asociación de Amigos del País, 2004. ISBN 9992244011.
- Mediavilla, Victor Herrero, L. Rosa Aguayo Nayle. Archivo biográfico de España, Portugal e Iberoamérica. New York: K. G. Saur, 1990. ISBN 3598320469.
- Yela, Carlos C. Haeussler. Diccionario general de Guatemala: Historia, geografía, bibliografía, economía, epigrafía, espeliología, iconografía, himnología, apéndice centroamericano, notas y noticias. s.n., 1983.

===== Honduras =====
- Argueta, Mario. Diccionario histórico-biográfico hondureño. Editorial Universitaria, 1990.
- Mediavilla, Victor Herrero, L. Rosa Aguayo Nayle. Archivo biográfico de España, Portugal e Iberoamérica. New York: K. G. Saur, 1990. ISBN 3598320469.
- Ramiro, Colindres O. Enciclopedia hondureña ilustrada: De personajes históricos y figuras contemporáneos. Graficentro Editores, 1994.

===== Nicaragua =====
- Arellano, Jorge Eduardo. Héroes sin fusil. Editorial Hispamer, 1998.
- Jirón, Manuel Quién es quién en Nicaragua. Ediciones Radio Amor, [1986]. ISBN 9977959005.
- Mediavilla, Victor Herrero, L. Rosa Aguayo Nayle. Archivo biográfico de España, Portugal e Iberoamérica. New York: K. G. Saur, 1990. ISBN 3598320469.
- U. S. Dept. of State, Bureau of Public Affairs. Nicaraguan biographies: A resource book. U.S. Dept. of State, Bureau of Public Affairs, [1988],

===== Panama =====
- Mediavilla, Victor Herrero, L. Rosa Aguayo Nayle. Archivo biográfico de España, Portugal e Iberoamérica. New York: K. G. Saur, 1990. ISBN 3598320469.
- Porras, J. Conte. Diccionario biográfico ilustrado de Panamá. Editorial Diego de Almagro, 1986.
- Zentner, Federico. Nombres y apellidos de forjadores de la patria. Ministerio de Educación, República de Panamá, 1984.

==== North America ====
- Gordon, Peter, Richard Aldrich. Biographical dictionary of North American and European educationists. Woburn Press, 1997. ISBN 0713002050.
- Heller, Jules and Nancy G, Heller, ed., North American Women Artists of the Twentieth Century: A Biographical Dictionary, Garland Reference Library of the Humanities (Vol. 1219), Garland Publishing Company, New York & London, 1995
- Henderson, James D., Helen Delpar, Maurice Philip Brungardt. A reference guide to Latin American history. M. E. Sharpe, 2000. ISBN 1563247445.

===== Canada =====
- Allaire, Jean Baptiste Arthur, ed. (1908–1920). Dictionnaire biographique du clerge canadien-francais (in French). St.-Hyacinthe: Impr. de "La Tribune".
- Ash, Lee, Bernhard A. Uhlendorf, Council of National Library Associations. A biographical directory of librarians in the United States and Canada. American Library Association, 1970. ISBN 0838900844.
- Baillie, Laureen. Canadian biographical archive. K. G. Saur Verlag, 2001–2003. ISBN 3598347340.
- Canadian Dictionary of Biography (online)
- Canadian who's who. Musson Book co., 1910.
- The Canadian who's who: a biographical dictionary of notable living men and women. Toronto: University of Toronto Press, 1910–. ISSN 0068-9963. Available online here.
- Cook, Ramsay, Réal Bélanger, Library and Archives Canada, Université Laval, University of Toronto. Dictionary of Canadian biography online. Library and Archives Canada; Université Laval; University of Toronto, 2003-. Available online here.
- Dale, Doris Cruger. A directory of oral history tapes of librarians in the United States and Canada. American Library Association, 1986. ISBN 0838904432.
- Kelly, Howard A., Walter L. Burrage. Dictionary of American medical biography: Lives of eminent physicians of the United States and Canada, from the earliest times. London: D. Appleton and Co., 1928.
- Morice, Adrien Gabriel (1908). Dictionnaire historique des Canadiens et des Metis francais de l'Ouest (ed.). Biographie Nationale et Nouvelle Biographie Nationale numérisées (in French). Quebec: Garneau.
- Wallace, W. Stewart, William Angus McKay. The Macmillan dictionary of Canadian biography. Macmillan of Canada, 1978. ISBN 0770514626.

===== Mexico =====
- Camp, Roderic A. Mexican political biographies: 1884–1935. University of Texas Press, 1991. ISBN 9780292751194.
- Camp, Roderic Ai. Who's who in Mexico today. Westview Press, 1993. ISBN 0813384524.
- Contemporary Hispanic biography: profiles from the international Hispanic community. Gale, 2002–. ISSN 1541-1524.
- Covington, Paula Hattox, David Block. Latin America and the Caribbean: A critical guide to research sources. Greenwood Press, 1992. ISBN 0313264031.
- Diccionario Porrúa de historia, biografía y geografía de México. Editorial Porrúa, 1995. ISBN 968452904X.
- Gómez, Vázquez Juana. Dictionary of Mexican rulers, 1325–1997. Greenwood Press, 1997. ISBN 0313300496.
- Granados, Rafael García. Diccionario biográfico de historia antigua de Méjico. Instituto de Historia, 1955.
- Marting, Diane E. Women writers of Spanish America: An annotated bio-bibliographical guide. Greenwood Press, 1987. ISBN 0313249695.
- Mediavilla, Victor Herrero, L. Rosa Aguayo Nayle. Archivo biográfico de España, Portugal e Iberoamérica. New York: K. G. Saur, 1990. ISBN 3598320469.
- Meier, Matt S., Conchita Franco Serri, Richard A. Garcia. Notable Latino Americans: A biographical dictionary. Greenwood Press, 1997. ISBN 058538908X.
- Musacchio, Humberto. Quién es quién en la política mexicana: Diccionario. Plaza Janés, 2002. ISBN 9681105826.
- Sierra, Carlos J. Diccionario biográfico de Campeche. Ediciones de la Muralla, 1997. ISBN 9686873732.
- Sosa, Francisco (1884). Secretario de Fomento (ed.). Biografias de Mexicanos distinguidos (in Spanish). Mexico: Oficina Tipografica de la Secretaria de Fomento.
- Tovar, Aurora. Mil quinientas mujeres en nuestra conciencia colectiva: Catálogo biográfico de mujeres de México. Documentación y Estudio de Mujeres, 1996. ISBN 968685116X.

===== United States =====
- Adamson, Lynda G. Notable women in American history: A guide to recommended biographies and autobiographies. Greenwood Press, 1999. ISBN 0313295840.
- African American biographical database (AABD). ProQuest Information and Learning Company, 2001–. Available here.
- Allen, William (1857). The American Biographical Dictionary: Containing an Account of the Lives, Characters, and Writings of the Most Eminent Persons Deceased in North America from Its First Settlement. J.P. Jewett and Company.
- American Council of Learned Societies. Dictionary of American biography. Scribner, 1928–1996.
- American Council of Learned Societies. American national biography online. Oxford University Press, 2000-. Available online here.
- Ash, Lee, Bernhard A. Uhlendorf, Council of National Library Associations. A biographical directory of librarians in the United States and Canada. American Library Association, 1970. ISBN 0838900844.
- Ashley, Perry J. American newspaper journalists, 1873–1900. Gale Research, 1983. ISBN 0810311453.
- Ahsley, Perry J. American newspaper publishers, 1950–1990. Gale Research, 1993. ISBN 0810353865.
- Bailey, Martha J. American women in science: 1950 to the present: a biographical dictionary. ABC-CLIO, 1998. ISBN 0874369215.
- Blake, John Lauris (1859). A biographical dictionary: comprising a summary account of the lives of the most distinguished persons of all ages, nations, and professions; including more than two thousand articles of American biography. H. Cowperthwait & co.
- Bowman, John Stewart. The Cambridge dictionary of American biography. Cambridge University Press, 1995. ISBN 0521402581.
- Briggs, Ward W.; Association, American Philological (1994). Biographical Dictionary of North American Classicists. Greenwood Publishing Group. ISBN 978-0-313-24560-2.
- Cannon, John, Frank Robinson. Biography database: 1680–1830. Romulus Press, 1995–2000.
- Christensen, Lawrence O.; Foley, William E.; Kremer, Gary R.; Winn, Kenneth H. (7 October 1999). Dictionary of Missouri Biography. University of Missouri Press. ISBN 978-0-8262-1222-1.
- Clinton, Catherine, Christine A. Lunardini. The Columbia guide to American women in the nineteenth century. Columbia University Press, 2000. ISBN 0231109202.
- Congressional Medal of Honor Society. Congressional Medal of Honor Society. Available online here.
- Congressional Yellow Book Leadership Connect, Inc., 1975-.
- Contemporary black biography. Gale Research Inc., 1992–. ISSN 1058-1316.
- Contemporary Hispanic biography: profiles from the international Hispanic community. Gale, 2002–. ISSN 1541-1524.
- Contemporary theatre, film, and television. Gale Research, 1984–. ISSN 0749-064X.
- Cross, Mary. 100 people who changed 20th-century America. ABC-CLIO, 2013. ISBN 9781610690850.
- Cummings, Paul, Dictionary of Contemporary American Artists, St. Martin's Press, New York, 1977
- Dale, Doris Cruger. A directory of oral history tapes of librarians in the United States and Canada. American Library Association, 1986. ISBN 0838904432.
- Dematteis, Philip Breed, Leemon B. McHenry. American philosophers, 1950–2000. Gale Group, 2003. ISBN 078766023X.
- Dexter, Franklin Bowditch (1885–1912). Biographical Sketches of the Graduates of Yale College. New York: Holt.
- Dictionary of American Biography. Scribner's, 1928-.
- Dictionary of North Carolina Biography. University of North Carolina Press. available here.
- DuPree, Sherry Sherrod. Biographical dictionary of African-American, Holiness-Pentecostals, 1880–1990. Middle Atlantic Regional Press, 1989. ISBN 0961605693.
- Falk, Peter Hastings, Who Was Who in American Art, Sound View Press, Madison Connecticut, 1985
- Federal Yellow Book Leadership Connect, Inc., 1986-.
- Foner, Eric. Freedom's lawmakers: A directory of black officeholders during Reconstruction. Louisiana State University Press, 1996. ISBN 0807120820.
- Gore, James Howard. American members of foreign orders. W. F. Roberts, 1910.
- Grimm, Robert T. Notable American philanthropists: Biographies of giving and volunteering. Greenwood Press, 2002. ISBN 1573563404.
- Günümüz Türkiyesinde kim kimdir (Who's who in Turkey.) Profesyonel, 1986–2002?.
- Hafner, Arthur Wayne, Fred W. Hunter, B. Michael Tarpey. Directory of deceased American physicians, 1804–1929: A genealogical guide to over 149,000 medical practitioners providing brief biographical sketches drawn from the American Medical Association's Deceased Physician Masterfile. American Medical Association, c1993. ISBN 0899705278.
- Hamilton, Neil A. American business leaders: From colonial times to the present. ABC-CLIO, 1999. ISBN 9781576070024.
- Hannan, Caryn; Herman, Jennifer L.; Dye, Bryan; Mel Ewald; Gloria Genel-Gonzalez (1 December 2008). Michigan Biographical Dictionary. North American Book Dist LLC. ISBN 978-1-878592-95-8.
- Hannan, Caryn (1 December 2008). Wisconsin Biographical Dictionary. North American Book Dist LLC. ISBN 978-1-878592-63-7.
- Hubbell, John T. (1995). Biographical Dictionary of the Union: Northern Leaders of the Civil War. Greenwood Publishing Group. ISBN 978-0-313-20920-8.
- Hyman, Paula, Deborah Dash Moore, Phyllis Holman Weisbard. Jewish women in America: An historical encyclopedia. Routledge, 1997. ISBN 0415919363.
- IFILM. Film directors: A complete guide. Lone Eagle, 1984–. ISSN 0740-2872.
- Ingham, John N. (1983). Biographical Dictionary of American Business Leaders. Greenwood Publishing Group. ISBN 978-0-313-23907-6.
- Ingham, John N.; Feldman, Lynne B. (1990). Contemporary American business leaders: a biographical dictionary. Greenwood Press. ISBN 978-0-313-25743-8.
- Ingham, John N.; Feldman, Lynne B. (1994). African-American Business Leaders: A Biographical Dictionary. Greenwood Publishing Group. p. 257. ISBN 978-0-313-27253-0.
- James, Edward T., Janet Wilson James, Paul S. Boyer. Notable American Women, 1607–1950: A Biographical Dictionary. Belknap Press of Harvard University Press, 1971. ISBN 0674627318.
- Kaufman, Martin, Joellen Watson Hawkins, Loretta P. Higgins, Alice Howell Friedman. Dictionary of American nursing biography. Greenwood Press, 1988. ISBN 0313245207.
- Kelly, Howard A., Walter L. Burrage. Dictionary of American medical biography: Lives of eminent physicians of the United States and Canada, from the earliest times. London: D. Appleton and Co., 1928.
- Krul, Arthur J. American literary journalists, 1945–1995. Gale Research, 1997. ISBN 0787611190.
- Leadership Connect. Leadership Connect, Inc., 2002-. Available online here.
- Leonard, John W. Who's who in New York city and state. Hamersly, 1909.
- Litoff, Judy Barrett, Judith McDonnell. European immigrant women in the United States: A biographical dictionary. Garland Publ., 1994. ISBN 0824053060.
- Marcus, Jacob Rader, Judith M. Daniels. The concise dictionary of American Jewish biography. Carlson Publ., 1994. ISBN 0926019740.
- Marquis, Albert Nelson. Who's Who in America. Marquis, 1899-. ISSN 0083-9396.
- Marquis Who's Who. Who's who of American women. Marquis Who's Who, 1958-.
- Marquis Who's Who. Who was who in America. Marquis Who's Who, 1943-. ISSN 0146-8081.
- Marquis Who's Who. Who's who among human services professionals. Marquis Who's Who, 1986-.
- Marquis Who's Who. Who's who in 20th century America. Marquis Who's Who, 2000.
- McKerns, Joseph P. Biographical dictionary of American journalism. Greenwood Press, 1989. ISBN 0313238189.
- Men and women of America. Hamersley, 1910.
- Meyer, George H., George H. Meyer, Jr., Katherine P. White, Museum of American Folk Art. Folk artists biographical index. Gale Research, 1987. ISBN 0810321459.
- Monroe, Dan, Bruce Tap. Shapers of the great debate on the Civil War: A biographical dictionary. Greenwood Press, 2005. ISBN 0313317453.
- Muccigrosso, Robert, and Suzanne Niemeyer. Research guide to American historical biography. Beacham, 1988–1992. ISBN 0933833091.
- Ohles, John F. (1978). Biographical Dictionary of American Educators. Greenwood Publishing Group. ISBN 978-0-8371-9893-4.
- Ohles, Frederik; Ohles, Shirley M.; Ramsay, John G. (1997). Biographical Dictionary of Modern American Educators. Greenwood Publishing Group. ISBN 978-0-313-29133-3.
- Onofrio, Jan (1 May 2000). Iowa Biographical Dictionary. North American Book Dist LLC. ISBN 978-0-403-09304-5.
- Onofrio, Jan (1 December 2000). Kansas Biographical Dictionary: People of All Times and Places Who Have Been Important to the History and Life of the State. North American Book Dist LLC. ISBN 978-0-403-09313-7.
- Onofrio, Jan (1 June 1999). Tennessee Biographical Dictionary. North American Book Dist LLC. ISBN 978-0-403-09700-5.
- Opitz, Glenn B, Editor, Mantle Fielding's Dictionary of American Painters, Sculptors & Engravers, Apollo Book, Poughkeepsie NY, 1986
- Peel, Albert. The Congregational two hundred, 1530–1948. Independent Press, [1948].
- Polner, Murray. American Jewish biographies. Facts on File, [1982]. ISBN 0871964627.
- Porter, David L. (2000). Biographical Dictionary of American Sports: G-P. Greenwood Publishing Group. ISBN 978-0-313-31175-8.
- Powell, William S., ed. (13 May 1996). Dictionary of North Carolina Biography: Vol. 6, T-Z. Univ of North Carolina Press. ISBN 978-0-8078-2225-8.
- Purcell, L. Edward. Who was who in the American Revolution. Facts on File, 1993. ISBN 0816021074.
- Riley, Sam G. American magazine journalists, 1741–1850. Gale Research, 1988. ISBN 081034551X.
- Riley, Sam. G. Biographical dictionary of American newspaper columnists. Greenwood Press, 1995. ISBN 0313291926.
- Ritter, Charles F., Jon L. Wakelyn. Leaders of the American Civil War: A biographical and historiographical dictionary. Greenwood Press, 1998. ISBN 0313295603.
- Roberts, Nancy L. American peace writers, editors, and periodicals: A dictionary. Greenwood Press, 1991. ISBN 0313268428.
- Roysdon, Christine, Linda A. Khatri. American engineers of the nineteenth century: A biographical index. Garland, 1978. ISBN 0824098277.
- Sabine, Lorenzo (1864). Biographical Sketches of Loyalists of the American Revolution. Boston: Little. ISBN 9780790571409.
- Sammons, Vivian O. Blacks in science and medicine. Hemisphere, 1990. ISBN 0891166653.
- Seller, Maxine. Women educators in the United States, 1820–1993: A bio-bibliographical sourcebook. Greenwood Press, 1994. ISBN 0313279373.
- Shavit, David. The United States in Latin America: A historical dictionary. Greenwood Press, 1992. ISBN 0313275955.
- Shearer, Benjamin F. Home front heroes: A biographical dictionary of Americans during wartime. Greenwood Press, 2007. ISBN 031333420X.
- Sibley, John Langdon, ed. (1873–1975). Biographical Sketches of Those Who Attended Harvard College. Boston: Massachusetts Historical Society.
- Sickels, Robert. 100 entertainers who changed America: an encyclopedia of pop culture luminaries. Greenwood, 2013. ISBN 9781598848304.
- Smith, Ben A., James W. Vining. American geographers, 1784–1812: A bio-bibliographical guide. Praeger, 2003. ISBN 0313323364.
- Sporting News. Baseball register. Sporting News, 1940–. ISSN 0162-542X.
- North Carolina Biographical Dictionary. North American Book Dist LLC. 1 June 1999. ISBN 978-0-403-09735-7.
- Taft, William H. Encyclopedia of twentieth-century journalists. Garland, 1986. ISBN 0824089618.
- Thrapp, Dan L. Encyclopedia of frontier biography. A. H. Clark, 1988–1994. ISBN 0870621912.
- Todd, Janet M. A dictionary of British and American women writers, 1660–1800. Rowman and Allanheld, 1985. ISBN 0847671259.
- Utter, Glenn H., Charles Lockhart, Robert Jervis. American political scientists: A dictionary. Greenwood Press, 2002. ISBN 031331957X.
- Wakelyn, Jon L. Birth of the Bill of Rights: Encyclopedia of the Antifederalists. Greenwood Press, 2004. ISBN 0313317399.
- Waldman, Carl. Biographical dictionary of American Indian history to 1900. Facts on File, 2001. ISBN 0816042527.
- White, James Terry. National cyclopaedia of American biography. J. T. White, 1892–1984.
- Who's who among Hispanic Americans. Gale Research, 1991–1994. ISSN 1052-7354.
- Willard, Frances Elizabeth and Mary A. Livermore, ed. (1893). A Woman of the Century. Buffalo, NY: Charles Wells Moulton.
- Who's who in the Northwest. Western Press association, 1910.
- Wilson, J. G. and John Fiske, ed. (1894–1900). Appleton's Cyclopedia of American Biography. New York: Appleton.
- Witzel, Morgen. The encyclopedia of the history of American management. Thoemmes Continuum, 2005. ISBN 9781843711315.
- Wright, John D. The Routledge encyclopedia of Civil War era biographies. Routledge, 2013. ISBN 9780415878036.
- Zia, Helen, Susan B. Gall, George Takei. Notable Asian Americans. Gale Research, 1995. ISBN 0810396238.

====== Eastern United States ======
- Marquis Who's Who. Who's who the East. Marquis Who's Who, 1943-.

====== New England ======
- Marquis Who's Who. Who's who in New England. Marquis Who's Who, 1909–1949.

====== Midwestern United States ======
- Bentley, Helms and Rospond, Artists in Michigan 1900–1976: A Biographical Dictionary, Introduction by Dennis Barrie, Wayne State University Press, Detroit, 1989
- Gibson, Arthur Hopkin, Artists of Early Michigan: A Biographical Dictionary of Artists Native to or Active in Michigan, 1701–1900, Wayne State University Press, Detroit, 1975
- Marquis Who's Who. Who's Who in the Midwest or Who's Who in the central states. Marquis Who's Who, 1947-.

====== Southern and Southwestern United States ======
- Marquis Who's Who. Who's who in the south and southwest. Marquis Who's Who, 1947-.
- Ortega, Pach, Cook et al., New Mexico Artists, University of New Mexico, Albuquerque 1952

====== Western United States ======
- Marquis Who's Who. Who's who in the West or Who's Who on the Pacific coast. Marquis Who's Who, 1947-.

==== South America ====
- Contemporary Hispanic biography: profiles from the international Hispanic community. Gale, 2002–. ISSN 1541-1524.
- Covington, Paula Hattox, David Block. Latin America and the Caribbean: A critical guide to research sources. Greenwood Press, 1992. ISBN 0313264031.
- Henderson, James D., Helen Delpar, Maurice Philip Brungardt. A reference guide to Latin American history. M. E. Sharpe, 2000. ISBN 1563247445.
- Marting, Diane E. Women writers of Spanish America: An annotated bio-bibliographical guide. Greenwood Press, 1987. ISBN 0313249695.
- Shavit, David. The United States in Latin America: A historical dictionary. Greenwood Press, 1992. ISBN 0313275955.
- Who's who in Latin America: Government, politics, banking and industry. Norman Ross, 1993–1997. ISSN 1068-7696.

===== Argentina =====
- Argento, Analía and Ana Gerschenson1. Quién es quién en la política argentina. Libros Perfil, 1999. ISBN 9506393532.
- Chávez, Fermin, Roberto Vilchez, Enrique Manson, Lorenzo González. Diccionario histórico argentino. Ediciones Fabro, 2005. ISBN 9872166609.
- Cutolo, Vicente Osvaldo. Nuevo diccionario biográfico argentino, 1750–1930. Editorial Elche, 1968–1985.
- Cutolo, Vicente Osvaldo, Federico Pergola. Novisimo diccionario biografico argentino, 1930–1980. Editorial Elche, 2004–.
- Galasso, Norberto. Los malditos: hombres y mujeres excluídos de la historia oficial de los argentinos. Ediciones Madres de Plaza de Mayo, 2005–2009.
- Mediavilla, Victor Herrero, L. Rosa Aguayo Nayle. Archivo biográfico de España, Portugal e Iberoamérica. New York: K. G. Saur, 1990. ISBN 3598320469.
- Muzzio, Julio A. (1920). Diccionario historico y biografico de la Republica Argentina (in Spanish). Buenos Aires: Roldan.
- Publicaciones Referenciales Latinoamericanas. Quién es quién en América del Sur. Publicaciones Referenciales Latinoamericanas, 1982–.
- Udaondo, Enrique, Gregorio Araoz Alfaro. Diccionario biográfico colonial argentino. Editorial Huarpes, 1945.

===== Bolivia =====
- Arze, José Roberto. Diccionario biográfico boliviano. Editorial Los Amigos del Libro, 1984–[1996]. ISBN 8483700689.
- Canedo, Benjamín Hinojosa. Quienes somos: Quién es quién en Bolivia. Secretaría Nacional de Cultura, [1999].
- Editores Quién es Quién en Bolivia. Quién es quién en Bolivia 2003. Editores Quién es Quién en Bolivia, [2003].
- Mediavilla, Victor Herrero, L. Rosa Aguayo Nayle. Archivo biográfico de España, Portugal e Iberoamérica. New York: K. G. Saur, 1990. ISBN 3598320469.
- Romecin, Edmundo Montenegro. Diccionario biográfico de personalidades en Bolivia. La Paz, Bolivia: s.n., 1999–. ISSN 0419-0998.

===== Brazil =====
- Abreu, Alzira Alves de. Dicionário histórico-biográfico da Primeira República: 1889–1930. Centro de Pesquisa e Documentação de História Contemporânea do Brasil. (Portuguese). Available online here.
- Abreu, Alzira Alves de. Dicionário histórico-biográfico brasileiro, pós-1930. FGV Editora: FGV CPDOC, 2001. ISBN 8522503419.
- Bruno, Adriana. Quem é quem na história do Brasil. Abril Multimídia, 2000. ISBN 8587710257. (Portuguese).
- Mediavilla, Victor Herrero, L. Rosa Aguayo Nayle. Archivo biográfico de España, Portugal e Iberoamérica. New York: K. G. Saur, 1990. ISBN 3598320469.
- Paule, Christiane Jalles de, Fernando Lattman-Weltman. Dicionario historico-biografico brasileiro, pos-1930.. Centro de Pesquisa e Documentação de História Contemporânea do Brasil. Also available online as Dicionario historico-biografico brasileiro. here.
- Schumaher, Schuma, Erico Vital Brazil. Dicionário mulheres do Brasil: De 1500 até a atualidade; Com 270 ilustrações. J. Zahar Editor, 2000. ISBN 8571105731.
- Tapajós, Vicente Costa Santos, Instituto Histórico e Geográfico Brasileiro. Dicionário biobibliográfico de historiadores, geógrafos e antropólogos brasileiros. Instituto Histórico e Geográfico Brasileiro, 1991–1998.

===== Chile =====
- Céspedes, Mario, Lelia Garreaud. Gran diccionario de Chile: Biográfico-cultural. Importadora Alfa, 1988.
- Diccionario biográfico de Chile. Empresa Periodística Chile, 1936–1986.
- Infante, Fernando Castillo, Lía Cortés, Jordi Fuentes. Diccionario histórico y biográfico de Chile. Zig-Zag, 1999. ISBN 9561211521.
- Figueroa, Pedro Pablo, ed. (1897–1902). Diccionario biographifico de Chile (in Spanish). Santiago: Impr. y Encuadernacion Barcelona.
- Mediavilla, Victor Herrero, L. Rosa Aguayo Nayle. Archivo biográfico de España, Portugal e Iberoamérica. New York: K. G. Saur, 1990. ISBN 3598320469.
- Medina del Rio, Luis Francisco, ed. (1906). Diccionario biografico colonial de Chile (in Spanish). Santiago: Impr. Elzeviriana.
- Prieto del Rio, Luis Francisco, ed. (1907). Muestras de errores y defectos del "Diccionario biografico colonial de Chile por Jose Toribio Medina" (in Spanish). Santiago: Impr. y Encuadernacion Chile.

===== Colombia =====
- Gómez Pérez, Fernando, Jaime Gómez Pérez. 300 colombianos de todas las épocas. Próyex Editores, 2002. ISBN 9583339776.
- González Toledo, Felipe. Quién es quién en Colombia, 1978: Biografías contemporáneas. Editorial Temis Librería, 1978. ISBN 8482720643.
- Mediavilla, Victor Herrero, L. Rosa Aguayo Nayle. Archivo biográfico de España, Portugal e Iberoamérica. New York: K. G. Saur, 1990. ISBN 3598320469.
- Ospina, Joaquín. Diccionario biográfico y bibliográfico de Colombia. Editorial de Cromos, 1927–39.
- Perozzo, Carlos, Renán Flórez, Eugenio de Bustos Tovar. Forjadores de Colombia contemporánea: Los 81 personajes que más han influido en la formación de nuestro país. Planeta, 1986. ISBN 9586141624.

===== Ecuador =====
- Alarcón Costta, César (2000), Diccionario Biográfico Ecuatoriano, Quito, Ecuador, Ediciones La Tierra, 1,273 pages. ISBN 978-9978-41-083-7. (in Spanish)
- Costta, César Alarcón. Diccionario biográfico ecuatoriano. Fundación Ecuatoriana de Desarrollo; Editorial Raíces, 2000. ISBN 997841083X.
- Mediavilla, Victor Herrero, L. Rosa Aguayo Nayle. Archivo biográfico de España, Portugal e Iberoamérica. New York: K. G. Saur, 1990. ISBN 3598320469.
- Noboa, Fernando Jurado. Diccionario histórico genealógico de apellidos y familias de origen quechua, aymara y araucano (Ecuador). Temístocles Hernández, 2002. ISBN 9978424075.
- Pimentel, Rodolfo Pérez. Diccionario biográfico del Ecuador. Litografía e Imprenta de la Universidad de Guayaquil, 1987–.
- Pimentel, Rodolfo Pérez (2001): Diccionario biográfico del Ecuador, Guayaquil, Ecuador : Litografía e Imp. de la Universidad de Guayaquil, Vol 1 to 22. Free access to all volumes (1,600 articles) online. (in Spanish)

===== Falkland Islands =====
- Tatham, David. The dictionary of Falklands biography (including South Georgia): from discovery up to 1981. D. Tatham, 2008.

===== Guyana =====
- Seymour, Arthur J., Elma Seymour. Dictionary of Guyanese biography. [s.n.], 1985–1986.

===== Paraguay =====
- Amaral, Raúl. Forjadores del Paraguay: Diccionario biográfico. Distribuidora Quevedo de Ediciones, 2000. ISBN 9879246098.
- Cardozo, Lisandro. Diccionario de las artes visuales del Paraguay. L. Cardozo, [2005]. ISBN 9992590750.
- Mediavilla, Victor Herrero, L. Rosa Aguayo Nayle. Archivo biográfico de España, Portugal e Iberoamérica. New York: K. G. Saur, 1990. ISBN 3598320469.
- Quién es quién en el Paraguay?. Editorial F. Monte Domecq, v.1-16; 1941–2005.
- Verón, Luis. Enciclopedia biográfica paraguaya del bicentenario. Álvaro Ayala Producciones: Itaipu Binacional: Centro Cultural de la República Cabildo, 2009.

===== Peru =====
- Batres, Carlos Milla. Diccionario histórico y biográfico del Perú, siglos XV–XX. Editorial Milla Batres, 1986. ISBN 8459918203.
- Mediavilla, Victor Herrero, L. Rosa Aguayo Nayle. Archivo biográfico de España, Portugal e Iberoamérica. New York: K. G. Saur, 1990. ISBN 3598320469.
- Paz-Soldan, Juan Pedro (1921). Diccionario biografico de peruanos contemporaneos (in Spanish) (Nueva ed.). Lima: Lib. e. Impr. Gil.
- Requejo, Juan Vicente. Quién es quién en el Perú. Centro de Documentación Andina, [1990].
- Seviliano, Alfonso Cueva. Diccionario histórico biográfico: Peruanos ilustres. A.F.A. Editores Importadores, 2004.

===== Uruguay =====
- Campodónico, Miguel Angel. Nuevo diccionario de la cultura uruguaya: Sepa quién es quién en artes visuales, música, cine y video, teatro, letras y periodismo. Linardi y Risso, 2003. ISBN 9974559316.
- Castiglioni, Efrain Mannise, Jacobo Swier Grafner. Quién es quién en el Uruguay. Promociones y Ediciones Panamericana, 1997.
- Fraire, Osvaldo A. Diccionario biográfico de la mujer en el Uruguay. s.l.: s.n., 1999.
- Mediavilla, Victor Herrero, L. Rosa Aguayo Nayle. Archivo biográfico de España, Portugal e Iberoamérica. New York: K. G. Saur, 1990. ISBN 3598320469.
- Rela, Walter. Personalidades de la cultura en el Uruguay: Humanistas y científicos. Ediciones de la Plaza, 2001. ISBN 9974480418.
- Saldaña, José María Fernández. Diccionario uruguayo de biografías, 1810–1940. Editorial Amerindia, 1945.

===== Venezuela =====
- Dugarte, Rafael Angel Rivas, Gladys García Riera, Francisco Javier Pérez. Quiénes escriben en Venezuela: Diccionario de escritores venezolanos; Siglos XVIII a XXI. Caracas [Venezuela], 2006.
- Galería de Arte Nacional (Venezuela). Diccionario biográfico de las artes visuales en Venezuela. Fundación Galería de Arte Nacional, 2005. ISBN 9806420187.
- Mediavilla, Victor Herrero, L. Rosa Aguayo Nayle. Archivo biográfico de España, Portugal e Iberoamérica. New York: K. G. Saur, 1990. ISBN 3598320469.
- Montañés, Ismael Silva. Hombres y mujeres del siglo XVI venezolano. Academia Nacional de la Historia, 1983.
- Parilli, Jorge Maldonado. Gente de Venezuela: 500 años, 585 venezolanos. M. A. García, 1992.
- Quién es quién en Venezuela. Editorial Quiénes Somos en Venezuela, 1988–.
- Venezuela Tuya (2012), Biografías de Venezuela, online database of Venezuelan biographies, classified by area of interest and also alphabetically. No print edition. (in Spanish)

=== Asia ===
- Marquis Who's Who. Who's who in Asia. Marquis Who's Who, 2007-. ISSN 1930-1227.

==== Central Asia ====
- Thiébaud, Jean-Marie. Personnages marquants d'Asie centrale, du Turkestan et de l'Ouzbekistan: Dictionnaire biographique. Harmattan, 2004. ISBN 2747570177.

===== Afghanistan =====
- Adamec, Ludwig W. Biographical encyclopedia of Afghanistan. Pentagon Press, 2008. ISBN 9788182743212; ISBN 8182743214.
- Adamec, Ludwig W. Historical and political who's who of Afghanistan. Akademische Druck-u. Verlagsanstalt, 1975. ISBN 3201009210.

===== Kazakhstan =====
- Geron, Leonard, Alex Pravda. Who's who in Russia and the new states. I. B. Tauris, 1993. ISBN 1850434875.

===== Kyrgyzstan =====
- Geron, Leonard, Alex Pravda. Who's who in Russia and the new states. I. B. Tauris, 1993. ISBN 1850434875.

===== Tajikistan =====
- Geron, Leonard, Alex Pravda. Who's who in Russia and the new states. I. B. Tauris, 1993. ISBN 1850434875.

===== Turkmenistan =====
- Geron, Leonard, Alex Pravda. Who's who in Russia and the new states. I. B. Tauris, 1993. ISBN 1850434875.

===== Uzbekistan =====
- Geron, Leonard, Alex Pravda. Who's who in Russia and the new states. I. B. Tauris, 1993. ISBN 1850434875.
- Thiébaud, Jean-Marie. Personnages marquants d'Asie centrale, du Turkestan et de l'Ouzbekistan: Dictionnaire biographique. Harmattan, 2004. ISBN 2747570177.

==== East Asia ====
===== China =====
- Bartke, Wolfgang. Who's who in the People's Republic of China. K. G. Saur, [1981–1991]. ISBN 3598107714.
- Boorman, Howard L., ed. (1967). Biographical Dictionary of Republican China. Columbia University Press. ISBN 978-0-231-08955-5. Online at Internet Archive.
- Antoine Brébion, Antoine Cabaton. Dictionnaire de bio-bibliographie générale, ancienne et moderne de l'Indochine française. Société d'Éditions Géographiques, Maritimes et Coloniales, 1935.
- Brown, Kerry. Berkshire dictionary of Chinese biography. Berkshire Publishing Group, 2014. ISBN 9781933782669.
- Cavanaugh, Jerome. Who's who in China, 1918–1950: With an index. Chinese Materials Center, 1982. ISBN 0896446263.
- China vitae. China Vitae, Wen Wei Publ. Co. Ltd., 2003-. Available online here.
- De Crespigny, Rafe. A biographical dictionary of Later Han to the Three Kingdoms (23–220 AD). Brill, 2007. ISBN 9004156054.
- Fairbank Center for Chinese Studies. China Biographical Database Project. Harvard College. Available online here.
- Franke, Herbert. Sung biographies.`Steiner, 1976. ISBN 3515024123.
- Giles, Herbert Allen (1897–1902). A Chinese Biographical Dictionary. London: Quaritch.
- Goldfiem, Jacques de. Personnalités chinoises d'aujourd'hui. L'Harmattan, 1989. ISBN 9782738405098. (French).
- Goodman, David S. G. China's provincial leaders, 1949–1985. Humanities Press, 1986–. ISBN 0391034871.
- Goodrich, Luther Carrington; Fang, Chao-ying (1976). Dictionary of Ming Biography, 1368–1644. Association for Asian Studies. Ming Biographical History Project Committee, Columbia University Press. ISBN 978-0-231-03801-0.
- Hummel, Arthur W. Eminent Chinese of the Chʻing Period (1644–1912). U.S. Govt. Print. Off., 1943–1944; various reprints.
- Klein, Donald W., Anne B. Clark. Biographic dictionary of Chinese communism, 1921–1965. Harvard University Press, 1971. ISBN 0674074106.
- Lee, Lily Xiao Hong; Stefanowska, A. D. (2007). Biographical Dictionary of Chinese Women: Antiquity Through Sui, 1600 B.C.E.-618 C.E. M.E. Sharpe. ISBN 978-0-7656-1750-7.
- Lecher, Hanno E. Internet guide for Chinese studies. Sinological Institute, Leiden University, 1995–. Available here.
- Lee, Lily Xiao Hong, A. D. Stefanowska, Sue Wiles. Biographical dictionary of Chinese women. M. E. Sharpe, 1998–2007. ISBN 0765600439.
- Loewe, Michael. A biographical dictionary of the Qin, former Han and Xin periods, 221 BC–AD 24. Brill, 2000. ISBN 9004103643.
- Minden, Stephan von. Chinese biographical archive (CBA) (Chinesisches biographisches archiv.), K. G. Saur, 1996–1999. ISBN 3598339259.
- Song, Yuwu. Biographical dictionary of the People's Republic of China. McFarland & Company, Inc., Publishers, 2013.
- Zhang, Wenxian; Alon, Ilan (30 July 2009). Biographical Dictionary of New Chinese Entrepreneurs and Business Leaders. Edward Elgar Publishing. ISBN 978-1-84720-636-7.
- Zhongguo dang zheng jun gao ji ling dao ren ci dian 中国党政军高级领导人词典 [Who's who current Chinese leaders] (in Chinese and English). Shanghai: Wen Wei. 1998. ISBN 9623741189.
- Who's Who in China. Shanghai: China Weekly Review. 1918–1950.
- Who's who in China. Who's Who in Italy, 2006. Available online here.

====== Hong Kong ======
- Holdsworth, May, Christopher Munn. Dictionary of Hong Kong biography. Hong Kong University Press, 2012. ISBN 9789888083664.

====== Macau ======
- Mediavilla, Victor Herrero, L. Rosa Aguayo Nayle. Archivo biográfico de España, Portugal e Iberoamérica. New York: K. G. Saur, 1990. ISBN 3598320469.

===== Japan =====
- Dai-Nihon hakushi roku (1921–1930). Who's Who in "Hakushi" in Great Japan. Tokyo: Hattensha.
- Gessel, Van C. Japanese fiction writers, 1868–1945. Gale Research, 1997. ISBN 0787610682.
- International Culture Institute (Hong Kong). Who's who in Japan. International Culture Institute, 1984–1991.
- Iwao, Seiichi, Burton Watson. Biographical dictionary of Japanese history. International Society for Educational Information, 1978. ISBN 0870112740.
- Japan Biographical Research Dept. The Japan biographical encyclopedia and who's who. Rengo Press, 1958–1965.
- Jinji koshin roku. Tokyo: Jinji Koshinsha. 1903.
- Nichigani Associates. whoplus = Nichigai Asoshietsu Jinbutsu bunken joho. Nichigai Asoshietsu, 2001. available online here.
- Who's Who in Japan. Tokyo: Who's Who in Japan Publ. Office. 1912–1941.
- Wispelwey, Berend. Japanese biographical archive (JBA). K. G. Saur Verlag, 2000–2003. ISBN 3598340028. (Japanese, English, French, German, and other European languages).

===== North Korea =====
- Frey, Axel. Korean biographical archive (KBA). K. G. Saur, 2000–2004. ISBN 3598342543. (Korean, English, French, German, and Russian).
- Korea annual. Hapdong News Agency, 1964–2004. ISSN 1225-0147.

===== Republic of China =====
- Ontess, Harold M. One thousand westerners in Taiwan to 1945: A biographical and bibliographical dictionary. Institute of Taiwan History, Preparatory Office, Academic Sinica, 1999. ISBN 9576716187.
- Who's who in the Republic of China, Taiwan. Government Information Office, [2001– ].
- Zhaowei Zhang. Zhonghua min guo xian dai ming ren lu. Zhongguo min ren zhuan ji zhong xin, 1998. ISBN 9579107033.

===== South Korea =====
- Frey, Axel. Korean biographical archive (KBA). K. G. Saur, 2000–2004. ISBN 3598342543. (Korean, English, French, German, and Russian).
- Korea annual. Hapdong News Agency, 1964–2004. ISSN 1225-0147.

==== North Asia ====
===== Russia/Soviet Union =====
- Akademia Nauk, SSSR, ed. (1899–1914). Matieraly dlia biographicheskago slavaria dicistvitel'nykh chlenov Imperatorskoi Akademii Nauk (in Russian). Petrograd: Imperatorskaia Akademiia Nauk.
- Chuvakov, V. N. Nezabytye mogily: Rossiĭskoe zarubezhʹe: Nekrologi 1917–1997: V shesti tomakh. Rossiĭskaia͡ gos. biblioteka, 1999–. ISBN 5751001699.
- de Boer, S. P., E. J. Driessen, H. L. Verhaar, Universiteit van Amsterdam. Biographical dictionary of dissidents in the Soviet Union, 1956–1975. M. Nijhoff, 1982. ISBN 9024725380.
- Frey, Axel, K. G. Saur Verlag. Biographisches archiv der Sowjetunion (1917–1991). K. G. Saur Verlag, 2000–2003. ISBN 3598347049.
- Frey, Axel, K. G. Saur Verlag. Russisches biographisches archiv. K. G. Saur Verlag, 1997–2000. ISBN 9783598340611. (English, French, German, Russian).
- Geron, Leonard, Alex Pravda. Who's who in Russia and the new states. I. B. Tauris, 1993. ISBN 1850434875.
- Hoover Institution on War, Revolution, and Peace., RFE-RL, inc. The Soviet biographic archive, 1954–1985. Chadwyck-Healey, 1986.
- Institut zur Erforschung der UdSSR. Prominent personalities in the USSR. Scarecrow Press, 1968. ISSN 0555-4632.
- Kallinikov, Pavel. Russkii biograficheskii slovar. Pavel Kallinikov, 1997-. Available here.
- Kaufman, Isaak Mikhaĭlovich. Russkie biograficheskie i biobibliograficheskie slovari. Gos. izd-vo kul'turno-prosvetitel'noi lit-ry, 1955.
- Lewytzkyi, Dorys. Who's who in the Soviet Union: A biographical encyclopedia of 5,000 leading personalities in the Soviet Union. K. G. Saur Verlag, 1984. ISBN 3598104677.
- Russkii biograficheskii slovar' (in Russian). S.-Peterburg: Kadima. 1896–1918.
- Polovtsov, Aleksandr Aleksandrovich, B. L. Modzalevskiĭ, M. G Kurd. Russkīĭ bīograficheskīĭ slovar. Tipografiia I.N. Slorokholova [etc.], 1896–1918.
- Schulz-Torge, Ulrich-Joachim. Who was who in the Soviet Union: A biographical dictionary of more than 4,600 leading officials from the central apparatus and the republics to 1991. K. G. Saur, 1992. ISBN 3598108109.
- Soviet biographical service. J. L. Scherer, 1985–2002.
- Sov. ėnts͡iklopediia͡. Deia͡teli SSSR i revoliu͡ts͡ionnogo dvizheniia͡ Rossii: Ents͡iklopedicheskiĭ slovarʹ Granat. Sov. ėnts͡iklopediia͡, 1989. ISBN 5852700282.
- Who's Who Strategic Area. Who's who in Russia. Who's Who Strategic Area, 1998–2007. Available online here.
- Zealesskiĭ, K. A. Kto estʹ kto v istorii SSSR: 1953–1991. Veche, 2010. ISBN 9785953340472.

==== South Asia ====
===== Afghanistan =====
- Scholberg, Henry. The biographical dictionary of greater India. Promilla, 1998. ISBN 8185002231.

===== Bangladesh =====
- Baillie, Laureen, K. G. Saur Verlag. Indian biographical archive. K. G. Saur Verlag, 1997–2000. ISBN 3598341040.
- Śamasujjāmāna, Ābula Phajala. Who's who in Bangladesh art, culture, literature, 1901–1991. Tribhuj Prakashani, 1992.
- Scholberg, Henry. The biographical dictionary of greater India. Promilla, 1998. ISBN 8185002231.
- Singh, Nagendra Kr. Encyclopaedia of Muslim biography: India, Pakistan, Bangladesh. A. P. H., 2001. ISBN 8176482307.
- Who's who in Bangladesh. Times Publications, 1982–1984.
- Who's who in Bangladesh, 2000. Manu Islam Centre for Bangladesh Culture, 2001.

===== India =====
- Baillie, Laureen, K. G. Saur Verlag. Indian biographical archive. K. G. Saur Verlag, 1997–2000. ISBN 3598341040.
- Buckland, Charles Edward (1906). Dictionary of Indian Biography. London: Sonnenschein.
- Hayavadana Rao, Conjeeveram (1915). Indian Biographical Dictionary. Madras: Pillar.
- India who's who. INFA Publications, 1969–. ISSN 0073-6244.
- Indian Bibliographic Centre. Dictionary of Indian biography. Indian Bibliographic Centre, 2000. ISBN 8185131155.
- Riddick, John F. Who was who in British India. Greenwood Press, 1998. ISBN 0313292329.
- Scholberg, Henry. The biographical dictionary of greater India. Promilla, 1998. ISBN 8185002231.
- Sen, Siba Pada. Dictionary of national biography. Institute of Historical Studies, 1972–1974.
- Singh, Nagendra Kr. Encyclopaedia of Muslim biography: India, Pakistan, Bangladesh. A. P. H., 2001. ISBN 8176482307.
- Who's Who in India (Popular ed.). Lucknow: Newul Kishore Pr. 1911–1914.
- Who's Who in India, Burma and Ceylon. Poona: Sun Pub. House. 1911–1938.

===== Nepal =====
- Research Centre for Communication and Development (Kathmandu, Nepal). Nepal who's who. Research Centre for Communication and Development, 1997–2003.
- Scholberg, Henry. The biographical dictionary of greater India. Promilla, 1998. ISBN 8185002231.

===== Pakistan =====
- Baillie, Laureen, K. G. Saur Verlag. Indian biographical archive. K. G. Saur Verlag, 1997–2000. ISBN 3598341040.
- Research Institute of Historiography, Biography and Philosophy. Biographical encyclopedia of Pakistan. Research Institute of Historiography, Biography and Philosophy, 1956–. ISSN 0067-8732.
- Scholberg, Henry. The biographical dictionary of greater India. Promilla, 1998. ISBN 8185002231.
- Singh, Nagendra Kr. Encyclopaedia of Muslim biography: India, Pakistan, Bangladesh. A. P. H., 2001. ISBN 8176482307.

===== Sri Lanka =====
- Baillie, Laureen, K. G. Saur Verlag. Indian biographical archive. K. G. Saur Verlag, 1997–2000. ISBN 3598341040.
- Scholberg, Henry. The biographical dictionary of greater India. Promilla, 1998. ISBN 8185002231.
- Who's Who in India, Burma and Ceylon. Poona: Sun Pub. House. 1911–1938.
- Wimalaratne, K. D. G. Personalities, Sri Lanka: A biographical study (15th–20th century), 1490–1990 A.D., A–Z. Ceylon Business Appliances, 1994. ISBN 9559287001.

==== Southeast Asia ====
- Wispelwey, Berend. South-East Asian biographical archive. K. G. Saur, 1997–2000. ISBN 3598342241.

===== Brunei =====
- Horton, A. V. M. A biographical dictionary of Negara Brunei Darussalam, 1841–1998. A. V. M. Horton, 1999. ISBN 1900789256.
- Wispelwey, Berend. South-East Asian biographical archive. K. G. Saur, 1997–2000. ISBN 3598342241.

===== Cambodia =====
- Brébion, Antoine, Antoine Cabaton. Dictionnaire de bio-bibliographie générale, ancienne et moderne de l'Indochine française. Société d'Éditions Géographiques, Maritimes et Coloniales, 1935.
- Jennar, Raoul Marc, Jean Lacouture. Les clés du Cambodge. Maisonneuve et Larose, 1995. ISBN 2706811501.
- Wispelwey, Berend. South-East Asian biographical archive. K. G. Saur, 1997–2000. ISBN 3598342241.

===== East Timor =====
- Wispelwey, Berend. South-East Asian biographical archive. K. G. Saur, 1997–2000. ISBN 3598342241.

===== Indonesia =====
- Wispelwey, Berend. South-East Asian biographical archive. K. G. Saur, 1997–2000. ISBN 3598342241.

===== Laos =====
- Brébion, Antoine, Antoine Cabaton. Dictionnaire de bio-bibliographie générale, ancienne et moderne de l'Indochine française. Société d'Éditions Géographiques, Maritimes et Coloniales, 1935.
- Wispelwey, Berend. South-East Asian biographical archive. K. G. Saur, 1997–2000. ISBN 3598342241.

===== Malaysia =====
- New Malaysian who's who. Kasuya Publishing Sdn. Bhd., 1990–2005. ISBN 9839624024.
- People at the peak: the who's who of Malaysia. MI Pub. Sdn. Bhd, 2004-. ISSN 1823-3317.
- Wispelwey, Berend. South-East Asian biographical archive. K. G. Saur, 1997–2000. ISBN 3598342241.

===== Myanmar (Burma) =====
- Who's Who in India, Burma and Ceylon. Poona: Sun Pub. House. 1911–1938.
- Wispelwey, Berend. South-East Asian biographical archive. K. G. Saur, 1997–2000. ISBN 3598342241.

===== Philippines =====
- Manuel, E. Arsenio, Magdalena Avenir Manuel. Dictionary of Philippine biography. Filipiniana Publications, 1955–1995.
- Mediavilla, Victor Herrero, L. Rosa Aguayo Nayle. Archivo biográfico de España, Portugal e Iberoamérica. New York: K. G. Saur, 1990. ISBN 3598320469.
- Wispelwey, Berend. South-East Asian biographical archive. K. G. Saur, 1997–2000. ISBN 3598342241.

===== Singapore =====
- Who's who in Singapore. City Who's Who, 1981–.
- Wispelwey, Berend. South-East Asian biographical archive. K. G. Saur, 1997–2000. ISBN 3598342241.

===== Thailand =====
- Wispelwey, Berend. South-East Asian biographical archive. K. G. Saur, 1997–2000. ISBN 3598342241.

===== Vietnam =====
- Brébion, Antoine, Antoine Cabaton. Dictionnaire de bio-bibliographie générale, ancienne et moderne de l'Indochine française. Société d'Éditions Géographiques, Maritimes et Coloniales, 1935.
- Who's who in Vietnam. Barons Who's Who, 1998/1999–.
- Wispelwey, Berend. South-East Asian biographical archive. K. G. Saur, 1997–2000. ISBN 3598342241.

==== Western Asia ====
- Bidwell, Robin. Arabian personalities of the early twentieth century. Oleander Press, 1986. ISBN 0906672392.
- Fischbach, Michael R. Biographical encyclopedia of the modern Middle East and North Africa. Gale Group, 2008. ISBN 9781414418896.
- Kramme, U., Z. Urra Muena. Arab-Islamic biographical archive (AIBA). K. G. Saur, 1994–2002. ISBN 3598338953.
- Leick, Gwendolyn. Who's who in the Ancient Near East. Routledge, 1999. ISBN 0415132304.
- Salisbury, Joyce E., Mary Lefkowitz. Encyclopedia of women in the ancient world. ABC-CLIO, 2001. ISBN 1576070921.
- Shimoni, Yaacov. The Biographical dictionary of the Middle East. Facts on File, 1991. ISBN 0816024588.
- Who's who in the Arab world. Publitec Editions, 1966–. ISSN 0083-9752.

===== Armenia =====
- Geron, Leonard, Alex Pravda. Who's who in Russia and the new states. I. B. Tauris, 1993. ISBN 1850434875.
- Mouradian, George. Armenian infotext. Bookshelf Publishers, 1995. ISBN 0963450921.

===== Azerbaijan =====
- Geron, Leonard, Alex Pravda. Who's who in Russia and the new states. I. B. Tauris, 1993. ISBN 1850434875.

===== Bahrain =====
- Asia Pacific InfoServ Pty Ltd. Who's who in Bahrain. Asia Pacific Infoserv, 2006-.

===== Cyprus =====
- Günümüz Türkiyesinde kim kimdir (Who's who in Turkey.) Profesyonel, 1986–2002?.
- Koudounarēs, Aristeidēs L. Viographikon lexikon Kypriōn, 1800–1920. [s.n.], Typogr. St. Leivadiōtē, 2010. ISBN 9789963785636; ISBN 9963785638.
- Koukounas, Dēmosthenēs, Natasa Koukouna. Viographikē enkyklopaideia tou neōterou Hellēnismou, 1830–2010: archeia hellēnikēs viographias. Ekdoseis Metron, 2011. ISBN 9789607201799.

===== Georgia =====
- Geron, Leonard, Alex Pravda. Who's who in Russia and the new states. I. B. Tauris, 1993. ISBN 1850434875.

===== Iran =====
- Iran who's who. Echo of Iran, 1972–. ISSN 0301-0341.
- Milani, Abbas. Eminent Persians: The men and women who made modern Iran, 1941–1979: In two volumes. Syracuse University Press; Persian World Press, 2008. ISBN 9780815609070.

===== Israel =====
- Who's who in Israel and Jewish personalities from all over the world. Bronfman, 1945–2001.

===== Lebanon =====
- Who's who in Lebanon. Les Editions Publitec, 1963–. ISSN 0083-9612.

===== Saudi Arabia =====
- Who's who in the Saudi Arabia. Asia Pacific InfoServ, 2006–.

===== Syria =====
- Moubayed, Sami M. Steel and silk: Men and women who shaped Syria, 1900–2000. Cune, 2006. ISBN 1885942400.

===== Turkey =====
- Bey, Mehmet Süreyya, Nuri Akbayar, Seyit Ali Kahraman. Sicill-i Osmanî. Kültür Bakanligi ile Türkiye Ekonomik ve Toplumsal Tarih Vakfi'nin ortak yayinidir, 1996–1998. ISBN 9753330383.
- Günümüz Türkiyesinde kim kimdir (Who's who in Turkey.) Profesyonel, 1986–2002?.
- Mitler, Louis. Ottoman Turkish writers: A bibliographical dictionary of significant figures in pre-Republican Turkish literature. P. Lang, 1988. ISBN 0820406333.
- Nicol, Donald MacGillivray. A biographical dictionary of the Byzantine Empire. Seaby, 1991. ISBN 1852640480.
- Sauer, Jutta. Türkisches biographisches archiv (TBA) or Turkish biographical archive. K. G. Saur, 1999–2002. (Turkish, English, French, German, Italian, Latin). ISBN 3598342845.

=== Europe ===
- Emmerson, Richard Kenneth, Sandra Clayton-Emmerson. Key figures in medieval Europe: An encyclopedia. Routledge, 2006. ISBN 0415973856.
- Gordon, Peter, Richard Aldrich. Biographical dictionary of North American and European educationists. Woburn Press, 1997. ISBN 0713002050.
- Kamen, Henry Arthur Francis. Who's who in Europe, 1450–1750. Routledge, 2000. ISBN 0415147271.
- Raineval, Melville Henry Massue Ruvigny de. The titled nobility of Europe: An international peerage, or "Who's Who," of the sovereigns, princes, and nobles of Europe. Burke's Peerage, 1980. ISBN 0850110289.
- Salisbury, Joyce E., Mary Lefkowitz. Encyclopedia of women in the ancient world. ABC-CLIO, 2001. ISBN 1576070921.

==== Caucasus ====
===== Armenia =====
- Mouradian, George. Armenian infotext. Bookshelf Publishers, 1995. ISBN 0963450921.

==== Central Europe ====
- Köhler-Lutterbeck, Ursula, Monika Siedentopf. Lexikon der 1000 Frauen. Dietz, 2000. ISBN 3801202763.
- Röder, Werner, Herbert Arthur Strauss. Biographisches Handbuch der deutschsprachigen Emigration nach 1933. K. G. Saur, 1980–1983. ISBN 3598100876.
- Roszkowski, Wojciech, Jan Kofman. Biographical dictionary of central and eastern Europe in the twentieth century. M.E. Sharpe, 2008. ISBN 9780765610270.
- Taylor, Stephen. Who's who in central and east-Europe. Central European Times, 1934–.

===== Austria =====
- Ackerl, Isabella, Friedrich Weissensteiner. Österreichisches personen lexikon. Ueberreuter, 1992. ISBN 3800034646.
- Austrian Academy of Sciences (2012): Österreichisches Biographisches Lexikon 1815–1950, Vienna, 12 volumes containing 120,000 biographies (A–Spa) now published. ISBN 978-3-7001-1327-0 (Vol 1). Subscription-based online access available. (in German)
- Bruckmüller, Ernst. Personenlexikon Österreich. Verlagsgemeinschaft Österreich-Lexikon, 2001. ISBN 395004387X.
- Killy, Walther, Rudolf Vierhaus, Dietrich von Engelhardt, Christiane Banerji. Dictionary of German biography. K. G. Saur, 2001–2006. ISBN 9783598232909.
- Österreichische Akademie der Wissenschaften. Österreichisches biographisches lexikon und biographische dokumentation. Verlag der Österreichischen Akademie der Wissenschaften. Available online here.
- Stock, Karl F., Rudolf Heilinger, Marylène Stock. Personalbibliographien österreichischer Persönlichkeiten. K. G. Saur, 1987–2010. ISBN 9783598247804.
- Taylor, Stephen. Who's who in central and east-Europe. Central European Times, 1934–.
- Wurzbach, Constantin (1856–1891). Biographisches Lexikon des Kaiserhums Osterreich (in German). Vienna: Zamarski.

===== Croatia =====
- Bernath, Mathias, Felix von Schroeder. Biographisches Lexikon zur Geschichte Südosteuropas. Oldenbourg, 1970–1981.
- Roszkowski, Wojciech, Jan Kofman. Biographical dictionary of central and eastern Europe in the twentieth century. M.E. Sharpe, 2008. ISBN 9780765610270.
- Stroynowski, Juliusz. Who's who in the socialist countries of Europe: A biographical encyclopedia of more than 12,600 leading personalities in Albania, Bulgaria, Czechoslovakia, German Democratic Republic, Hungary, Poland, Romania, Yugoslavia. K. G. Saur, 1989. ISBN 359810636X.
- Taylor, Stephen. Who's who in central and east-Europe. Central European Times, 1934–.

===== Czech Republic =====
- Churaň, Milan. Kdo byl kdo v našich dějinách ve 20. století. Libri, 1994. Available online here.
- Kramme, Ulrike, Želmíra Urra Muena. Český biografický archiv a slovenský biografický archív (CSBA): Tschechisches und slowakisches biographisches archiv: Eine kumulation aus 206 der wichtigsten biographischen nachschlagewerke für den tschechischen und slowakischen bereich bis zur gegenwart. K. G. Saur, 1993–1999. ISBN 3598334451. (Czech, English, French, German, Hungarian, Latin, and Slovak)
- Mináč, Vladimír. Slovenský biografický slovník: Od roku 833 do roku 1990. Matica slovenská, 1986–1994. ISBN 9788070900703.
- Roszkowski, Wojciech, Jan Kofman. Biographical dictionary of central and eastern Europe in the twentieth century. M.E. Sharpe, 2008. ISBN 9780765610270.
- Stroynowski, Juliusz. Who's who in the socialist countries of Europe: A biographical encyclopedia of more than 12,600 leading personalities in Albania, Bulgaria, Czechoslovakia, German Democratic Republic, Hungary, Poland, Romania, Yugoslavia. K. G. Saur, 1989. ISBN 359810636X.
- Taylor, Stephen. Who's who in central and east-Europe. Central European Times, 1934–.
- Tomeš, Josef. Český biografický slovník XX. století. Paseka, 1999. ISBN 8071852465.
- Trestik, Michael. Kdo je kdo: Osobnosti ceské soucasnosti: 5000 zivotopisu. Agentura Kdo je Kdo, 2005. ISBN 8090258697.

===== Hungary =====
- Bernath, Mathias, Felix von Schroeder. Biographisches Lexikon zur Geschichte Südosteuropas. Oldenbourg, 1970–1981.
- Biográf ki kicsoda. Enciklopédia Kiadó, 2002–. ISBN 9638477679.
- Jasznigi, Alexander and Imre Parlagi (1918). Das Geistige Ungarn (in German). Vienna: Braumuller.
- Kenyeres, Ágnes, Bortnyik Sándor. Magyar életrajzi lexikon: főszerkesztő Kenyeres Ágnes. Akadémiai Kiadó, 1967–1994. (Hungarian) ISBN 963052497X. Also available online here.
- Kramme, U., Ž. Urra Muena. Ungarisches biographisches archiv. K. G. Saur, 1993–1999. ISBN 3598337817. (Hungarian, English, German, Latin).
- Marako, Laszlo. Ki kicsoda a magyar történelemben. Helikon, 2005. ISBN 9632088638; ISBN 9789632088631.
- Roszkowski, Wojciech, Jan Kofman. Biographical dictionary of central and eastern Europe in the twentieth century. M.E. Sharpe, 2008. ISBN 9780765610270.
- Stroynowski, Juliusz. Who's who in the socialist countries of Europe: A biographical encyclopedia of more than 12,600 leading personalities in Albania, Bulgaria, Czechoslovakia, German Democratic Republic, Hungary, Poland, Romania, Yugoslavia. K. G. Saur, 1989. ISBN 359810636X.
- Szinnyei, József (1891–1914). Magyar írók élete és munkái (in Hungarian). Vol. I–XIV. Budapest: Hornyánszky.
- Taylor, Stephen. Who's who in central and east-Europe. Central European Times, 1934–.

===== Kosovo =====
- Stroynowski, Juliusz. Who's who in the socialist countries of Europe: A biographical encyclopedia of more than 12,600 leading personalities in Albania, Bulgaria, Czechoslovakia, German Democratic Republic, Hungary, Poland, Romania, Yugoslavia. K. G. Saur, 1989. ISBN 359810636X.

===== Poland =====
- Cyniker, Beata. Kto jest kim w Polsce. PAI, 2001. ISBN 8322326912.
- Hebig, Dieter, Oswald Balzer. Polskie archiwum biograficzne = Polnisches biographisches archiv. K. G. Saur, 1992–1995. ISBN 9783598327018. (Polish, English, French, German, Latin, and Russian).
- Konopczyński, Władysław (1935). Polski słownik biograficzny (in Polish). Zakład Narodowy im. Ossolińskich.
- Majchrowski, Jacek, Grzegorz Mazur, Kamil Stepan. Kto był kim w Drugiej Rzeczypospolitej. Polska Oficyna Wydawnicza "BGW", 1994. ISBN 8370665691.
- Roszkowski, Wojciech, Jan Kofman. Biographical dictionary of central and eastern Europe in the twentieth century. M.E. Sharpe, 2008. ISBN 9780765610270.
- Sokol, Stanley S., Sharon F. Mrotek Kissane, Alfred L. Abramowicz. The Polish biographical dictionary: Profiles of nearly 900 Poles who have made lasting contributions to world civilization. Bolchazy-Carducci, 1992. ISBN 086516245X.
- Stroynowski, Juliusz. Who's who in the socialist countries of Europe: A biographical encyclopedia of more than 12,600 leading personalities in Albania, Bulgaria, Czechoslovakia, German Democratic Republic, Hungary, Poland, Romania, Yugoslavia. K. G. Saur, 1989. ISBN 359810636X.
- Taylor, Stephen. Who's who in central and east-Europe. Central European Times, 1934–.

===== Romania =====
- Bernath, Mathias, Felix von Schroeder. Biographisches Lexikon zur Geschichte Südosteuropas. Oldenbourg, 1970–1981.
- Roszkowski, Wojciech, Jan Kofman. Biographical dictionary of central and eastern Europe in the twentieth century. M.E. Sharpe, 2008. ISBN 9780765610270.
- Stoica, Stan. Dicționar biografic de istorie a României. Editura Meronia, 2008.
- Stroynowski, Juliusz. Who's who in the socialist countries of Europe: A biographical encyclopedia of more than 12,600 leading personalities in Albania, Bulgaria, Czechoslovakia, German Democratic Republic, Hungary, Poland, Romania, Yugoslavia. K. G. Saur, 1989. ISBN 359810636X.
- Taylor, Stephen. Who's who in central and east-Europe. Central European Times, 1934–.

===== Serbia =====
- Leskovac, Mladen, Aleksandar Forišković, Čedomir Popov. Srpski biografski rečnik. Budućnost, 2004–2007. ISBN 8683651495. (Serbian).
- Roszkowski, Wojciech, Jan Kofman. Biographical dictionary of central and eastern Europe in the twentieth century. M.E. Sharpe, 2008. ISBN 9780765610270.
- Taylor, Stephen. Who's who in central and east-Europe. Central European Times, 1934–.

===== Slovakia =====
- Churaň, Milan. Kdo byl kdo v našich dějinách ve 20. století. Libri, 1994. Available online here.
- Kramme, Ulrike, Želmíra Urra Muena. Český biografický archiv a slovenský biografický archív (CSBA): Tschechisches und slowakisches biographisches archiv: Eine kumulation aus 206 der wichtigsten biographischen nachschlagewerke für den tschechischen und slowakischen bereich bis zur gegenwart. K. G. Saur, 1993–1999. ISBN 3598334451. (Czech, English, French, German, Hungarian, Latin, and Slovak)
- Mat'ovčík, Augustín, L'udmila Ďuranová, Anna Šourková. Lexikón slovenských žien. Slovenská národná knižnica, Národný biografický ústav, 2003. ISBN 8089023304.
- Mináč, Vladimír. Slovenský biografický slovník: Od roku 833 do roku 1990. Matica slovenská, 1986–1994. ISBN 9788070900703.
- Parenicka, Pavol. Biografický lexikón Slovenska. Slovenská Národná Kniznica, Národný biografický ústav, 2002–. ISBN 8089023150.
- Roszkowski, Wojciech, Jan Kofman. Biographical dictionary of central and eastern Europe in the twentieth century. M.E. Sharpe, 2008. ISBN 9780765610270.
- Stroynowski, Juliusz. Who's who in the socialist countries of Europe: A biographical encyclopedia of more than 12,600 leading personalities in Albania, Bulgaria, Czechoslovakia, German Democratic Republic, Hungary, Poland, Romania, Yugoslavia. K. G. Saur, 1989. ISBN 359810636X.
- Taylor, Stephen. Who's who in central and east-Europe. Central European Times, 1934–.

===== Slovenia =====
- Bajt, Drago. Slovenski kdo je kdo. Nova revija, 1999. ISBN 961601790X.
- Bernath, Mathias, Felix von Schroeder. Biographisches Lexikon zur Geschichte Südosteuropas. Oldenbourg, 1970–1981.
- Roszkowski, Wojciech, Jan Kofman. Biographical dictionary of central and eastern Europe in the twentieth century. M.E. Sharpe, 2008. ISBN 9780765610270.
- Stanonik, Tončka, Lan Brenk. Osebnosti: veliki slovenski biografski leksikon. Mladinska knjiga, 2008. ISBN 9789610105046.
- Stroynowski, Juliusz. Who's who in the socialist countries of Europe: A biographical encyclopedia of more than 12,600 leading personalities in Albania, Bulgaria, Czechoslovakia, German Democratic Republic, Hungary, Poland, Romania, Yugoslavia. K. G. Saur, 1989. ISBN 359810636X.
- Taylor, Stephen. Who's who in central and east-Europe. Central European Times, 1934–.

==== Eastern Europe ====
- Roszkowski, Wojciech, Jan Kofman. Biographical dictionary of central and eastern Europe in the twentieth century. M.E. Sharpe, 2008. ISBN 9780765610270.
- Taylor, Stephen. Who's who in central and east-Europe. Central European Times, 1934–.

===== Albania =====
- Bernath, Mathias, Felix von Schroeder. Biographisches Lexikon zur Geschichte Südosteuropas. Oldenbourg, 1970–1981.
- Elsie, Robert. A biographical dictionary of Albanian history. I.B. Tauris in association with The Centre for Albanian Studies, 2013. ISBN 9781780764313; ISBN 1780764316.
- Roszkowski, Wojciech, Jan Kofman. Biographical dictionary of central and eastern Europe in the twentieth century. M.E. Sharpe, 2008. ISBN 9780765610270.
- Stroynowski, Juliusz. Who's who in the socialist countries of Europe: A biographical encyclopedia of more than 12,600 leading personalities in Albania, Bulgaria, Czechoslovakia, German Democratic Republic, Hungary, Poland, Romania, Yugoslavia. K. G. Saur, 1989. ISBN 359810636X.
- Taylor, Stephen. Who's who in central and east-Europe. Central European Times, 1934–.

===== Belarus =====
- Geron, Leonard, Alex Pravda. Who's who in Russia and the new states. I. B. Tauris, 1993. ISBN 1850434875.
- Roszkowski, Wojciech, Jan Kofman. Biographical dictionary of central and eastern Europe in the twentieth century. M.E. Sharpe, 2008. ISBN 9780765610270.

===== Bosnia and Herzegovina =====
- Bernath, Mathias, Felix von Schroeder. Biographisches Lexikon zur Geschichte Südosteuropas. Oldenbourg, 1970–1981.
- Roszkowski, Wojciech, Jan Kofman. Biographical dictionary of central and eastern Europe in the twentieth century. M.E. Sharpe, 2008. ISBN 9780765610270.
- Stroynowski, Juliusz. Who's who in the socialist countries of Europe: A biographical encyclopedia of more than 12,600 leading personalities in Albania, Bulgaria, Czechoslovakia, German Democratic Republic, Hungary, Poland, Romania, Yugoslavia. K. G. Saur, 1989. ISBN 359810636X.
- Taylor, Stephen. Who's who in central and east-Europe. Central European Times, 1934–.

===== Bulgaria =====
- Bernath, Mathias, Felix von Schroeder. Biographisches Lexikon zur Geschichte Südosteuropas. Oldenbourg, 1970–1981.
- Cholpanov, Boris, Vasil Giu͡zelev, Simeon Mitev. Belezhiti bŭlgari. Dŭrzh voenno izd-vo, 1968–1984.
- Kitsevski, Nikola, Raicho Radulov. Koi koi e v Bulgariia. Trud, 1998–.
- Stroynowski, Juliusz. Who's who in the socialist countries of Europe: A biographical encyclopedia of more than 12,600 leading personalities in Albania, Bulgaria, Czechoslovakia, German Democratic Republic, Hungary, Poland, Romania, Yugoslavia. K. G. Saur, 1989. ISBN 359810636X.
- Taylor, Stephen. Who's who in central and east-Europe. Central European Times, 1934–.

===== Macedonia =====
- Stroynowski, Juliusz. Who's who in the socialist countries of Europe: A biographical encyclopedia of more than 12,600 leading personalities in Albania, Bulgaria, Czechoslovakia, German Democratic Republic, Hungary, Poland, Romania, Yugoslavia. K. G. Saur, 1989. ISBN 359810636X.

===== Moldova =====
- Geron, Leonard, Alex Pravda. Who's who in Russia and the new states. I. B. Tauris, 1993. ISBN 1850434875.
- Roszkowski, Wojciech, Jan Kofman. Biographical dictionary of central and eastern Europe in the twentieth century. M.E. Sharpe, 2008. ISBN 9780765610270.

===== Montenegro =====
- Stroynowski, Juliusz. Who's who in the socialist countries of Europe: A biographical encyclopedia of more than 12,600 leading personalities in Albania, Bulgaria, Czechoslovakia, German Democratic Republic, Hungary, Poland, Romania, Yugoslavia. K. G. Saur, 1989. ISBN 359810636X.

===== Serbia =====
- Stroynowski, Juliusz. Who's who in the socialist countries of Europe: A biographical encyclopedia of more than 12,600 leading personalities in Albania, Bulgaria, Czechoslovakia, German Democratic Republic, Hungary, Poland, Romania, Yugoslavia. K. G. Saur, 1989. ISBN 359810636X.

===== Ukraine =====
- Geron, Leonard, Alex Pravda. Who's who in Russia and the new states. I. B. Tauris, 1993. ISBN 1850434875.
- Roszkowski, Wojciech, Jan Kofman. Biographical dictionary of central and eastern Europe in the twentieth century. M.E. Sharpe, 2008. ISBN 9780765610270.

==== Northern Europe ====
- Kay, Ernest, Editorial Director, Dictionary of Scandinavian Biography, International Biographic Centre, Cambridge, England 1976

===== Denmark =====
- Engelstoft, Povl; Dahl, Svend, ed. (1979–84): Dansk biografisk leksikon (Danish Biographical Dictionary), 3rd edition in 16 volumes, Copenhagen, Gyldendal, ISBN 978-87-00-05551-3. Free searchable online access to the current updated version, is available from Gyldendal's Den Store Danske website. (in Danish)
- Erichsen, Balder Vermund Aage, Alfred Krarup. Dansk historisk bibliografi: Systematisk fortegnelse over bidrag til Danmarks historie til udgangen af 1912, i tilslutning til Bibliotheca Danica. I kommission hos G. E. C. Gad, 1929.
- Ilsøe, Harald. 555 danske selvbiografier og erindringer: En kronologisk fører med referater til trykte selvbiografier forfattet af personer født før 1790. Danske sprog- og litteraturselskab: C. A. Reitzel, 1987. ISBN 8774215477.
- Larsen, Jytte (ed) (2001), Dansk kvindebiografisk leksikon (Biographical Encyclopedia of Danish Women), Volumes 1-3, Copenhagen, Rosinante. ISBN 978-87-7357-487-4. The searchable online edition contains over 1,900 biographies from the Middle Ages to the present. (in Danish)
- Kraks Blå Bog (Who's Who in Denmark) online edition, 8219 biographies as of 2012-3, (in Danish)
- Metherell, David, Paul Guthrie. Scandinavian biographical archive. K. G. Saur, 1989–1991. ISBN 086291843X.

===== Estonia =====
- Alakula, Allan. Kes on kes? Ekspresskataloogide AS, 2000. ISBN 9985607899.
- Bayerische Staatsbibliothek, Universitätsbibliothek Tartu. Baltische biographische lexika. Münchener Digitalisierungszentrum, Available online here.
- Geron, Leonard, Alex Pravda. Who's who in Russia and the new states. I. B. Tauris, 1993. ISBN 1850434875.
- Korobov, Igorʹ, Li͡udmila Raudtits. Ėstonskiĭ biograficheskiĭ slovarʹ. KRK, 2002. ISBN 9789985840122.
- Nirk, Endel, Arthur Robert Hone, Oleg Mutt. Estonian literature: Historical survey with biobibliographical appendix. Perioodika, 1987.
- Roszkowski, Wojciech, Jan Kofman. Biographical dictionary of central and eastern Europe in the twentieth century. M.E. Sharpe, 2008. ISBN 9780765610270.
- Taylor, Stephen. Who's who in central and east-Europe. Central European Times, 1934–.
- Welding, Olaf, Wilhelm Lenz. Deutschbaltisches biographisches Lexikon 1710–1960. Böhlau Verlag, 1970. ISBN 3412426709; ISBN 9783412426705. Available free online here.

===== Finland =====
- Finsk biograpfisk handbok (in Finnish). Helsingfors: Edlunds Forlag. 1903.
- Klinge, Matti. Suomen kansallisbiografia. Suomalaisen Kirjallisuuden Seura, 2003–. ISBN 9789517464413.
- Kuka kukin on. Kustannusosakeyhtiö Otava, [etc.], 1920–. (Finnish).
- Metherell, David, Paul Guthrie. Scandinavian biographical archive. K. G. Saur, 1989–1991. ISBN 086291843X.
- Taylor, Stephen. Who's who in central and east-Europe. Central European Times, 1934–.
- Vem och vad: Biografisk handbok. Schildt, 1920–. ISSN 0789-3272.

===== Iceland =====
- Guðnason, Jón, Pétur Haraldsson. Íslenzkir samtíðarmenn. Bókaútgáfan samtíðarmenn, 1965–.
- Metherell, David, Paul Guthrie. Scandinavian biographical archive. K. G. Saur, 1989–1991. ISBN 086291843X.

===== Ireland =====
- Jacobs, Phyllis M. Registers of the universities, colleges, and schools of Great Britain and Ireland. Athlone Press, 1964.
- Jones, David Lewis. British and Irish biographies, 1840–1940. Chadwick-Healey, 1984–.
- McGuire, J. I., James Quinn. Dictionary of Irish biography. Cambridge University Press, 2009. Available here.
- O'Donoughue, D. J. The poets of Ireland: A biographical and bibliographical dictionary of Irish writers of English verse. Hodges, Figgis and Company, 1912.
- Phelan, Angela. Who's who in Ireland: The influential Irish. Madison Publications, 2006. ISBN 0951872834.
- Ryan, Richard (1819–1821). Biographia hibernica. London: Ryan.

===== Latvia =====
- Apinis, Peteris. A hundred great Latvians. Lauku Avize, 2006. ISBN 9789984262888.
- Bayerische Staatsbibliothek, Universitätsbibliothek Tartu. Baltische biographische lexika. Münchener Digitalisierungszentrum, Available online here.
- Geron, Leonard, Alex Pravda. Who's who in Russia and the new states. I. B. Tauris, 1993. ISBN 1850434875.
- Roszkowski, Wojciech, Jan Kofman. Biographical dictionary of central and eastern Europe in the twentieth century. M.E. Sharpe, 2008. ISBN 9780765610270.
- Taylor, Stephen. Who's who in central and east-Europe. Central European Times, 1934–.
- Welding, Olaf, Wilhelm Lenz. Deutschbaltisches biographisches Lexikon 1710–1960. Böhlau Verlag, 1970. ISBN 3412426709; ISBN 9783412426705. Available free online here.

===== Lithuania =====
- Bayerische Staatsbibliothek, Universitätsbibliothek Tartu. Baltische biographische lexika. Münchener Digitalisierungszentrum, Available online here.
- Biržiška, Vaclovas. Aleksandrynas; senųjų lietuvių rašytojų, rašiusių prieš 1865 m., biografijos, bibliografijos ir biobibliografijos (Aleksandrynas; biographies, bibliographies, and bio-bibliographies of old Lithuanian authors to 1865.) Išleido JAV LB Kultūros fondas, 1960–1965.
- Geron, Leonard, Alex Pravda. Who's who in Russia and the new states. I. B. Tauris, 1993. ISBN 1850434875.
- Roszkowski, Wojciech, Jan Kofman. Biographical dictionary of central and eastern Europe in the twentieth century. M.E. Sharpe, 2008. ISBN 9780765610270.
- Taylor, Stephen. Who's who in central and east-Europe. Central European Times, 1934–.
- Welding, Olaf, Wilhelm Lenz. Deutschbaltisches biographisches Lexikon 1710–1960. Böhlau Verlag, 1970. ISBN 3412426709; ISBN 9783412426705. Available free online here.

===== Norway =====
- Andersen, Alf G., Hans-Erik Hensen. 500 som preget Norge: Norske kvinner og menn i det 20. århundre. Millennium, 1999. ISBN 8251787890. (in Norwegian)
- Arntzen, Jon Gunnar, ed. (2009). Norsk biografisk leksikon (Norwegian Biographical Dictionary). Oslo: Kunnskapsforlaget. The print edition (1985) in 19 volumes contains 5,100 articles. ISBN 978-82-573-0734-9. The searchable online edition is a component of the Store norske leksikon. (in Norwegian)
- Hvem er hvem? (in Norwegian). Oslo: Aschehoug. 1912.
- Metherell, David, Paul Guthrie. Scandinavian biographical archive. K. G. Saur, 1989–1991. ISBN 086291843X.

===== Sweden =====
- Hofberg, Herman (2010). Svenskt Biografiskt Handlexikon: Alfabetiskt Ordnade Lefnadsteckningar Af Sveriges Namnkunniga Män Och Qvinnor Från Reformationen Till Närvarande Tid. BiblioBazaar. ISBN 978-1-143-13016-8. Freely accessible facsimile at the Project Runeberg website.
- Karlsson, Åsa, ed. (1917). Svenskt biografiskt lexikon. Stockholm: Riksarkivet. The Dictionary of Swedish National Biography, first published in 1917 (volume 1). Today there are 33 volumes containing some 14,000 articles. Free searchable online access is available from Riksarkivet.
- Metherell, David, Paul Guthrie. Scandinavian biographical archive. K. G. Saur, 1989–1991. ISBN 086291843X.
- Personhnistoriska samfundet. Personhistorisk tidskrift. Personhistoriska samfundet, 1898/99–. ISSN 0031-5699.
- Thyselius, Erik, Göran Lindblad. Vem är det? Norstedt, 1912–. (Swedish)

===== United Kingdom =====
- Alexander, Marc. A companion to the royal heritage of Britain. Sutton, 2005. ISBN 0750932686; ISBN 9780750932684.
- Baile, Laureen, Paul Sieveking. British biographical archive: A one-alphabet cumulation of 324 of the most important English-language biographical reference works originally published between 1601 and 1929. K. G. Saur, 1984–1989. ISBN 0862913667.
- Banks, Olive. The biographical dictionary of British feminists. New York University Press, 1985–1990. ISBN 0814710786.
- Black, A and C. Who's who and who was who. Oxford University Press, 2007. Available online here.
- Cannon, John, Frank Robinson. Biography database: 1680–1830. Romulus Press, 1995–2000.
- Contemporary theatre, film, and television. Gale Research, 1984–. ISSN 0749-064X.
- Gillow, Joseph (1892–1921). A Literary and Biographical History. London: Burns.
- Herbert, Stephen, Luke McKernan, British Film Institute. Who's who of Victorian cinema. British Film Institute, 1996. Available online here.
- Hole, Charles (1866). A Brief Biographical Dictionary. Hurd and Houghton.
- Jacobs, Phyllis M. Registers of the universities, colleges, and schools of Great Britain and Ireland. Athlone Press, 1964.
- Jenkins, Ellen J. Eighteenth-Century British Historians. Thomson Gale, 2007. ISBN 9780787681548.
- Jones, David Lewis. British and Irish biographies, 1840–1940. Chadwick-Healey, 1984–.
- Kelly's Handbook to the Titled, Landed, and Official Classes. London: Kelly Directories. 1880–1977.
- Kirby, D.P. (3 June 1997). A Biographical Dictionary of Dark Age Britain. Psychology Press. ISBN 978-1-85264-047-7.
- Mander, W. J., Alan P. F. Sell. The dictionary of nineteenth-century British philosophers. Thoemmes, 2002. ISBN 1855069555.
- Matthews, William. British autobiographies: An annotated bibliography of British autobiographies published or written before 1951. University of California Press, 1955.
- Methodist who's who. Culley, 1910.
- Munk, William, G. H. Brown, Richard Robertson Trail. The roll of the Royal College of Physicians of London: Comprising biographical sketches of all the eminent physicians whose names are recorded in the Annals... Royal College of Physicians of London, 1878–.
- Peel, Albert. The Congregational two hundred, 1530–1948. Independent Press, [1948].
- Royal Society (Great Britain). Biographical memoirs of fellows of the royal society. Royal Society, 1955–. ISSN 0080-4606.
- Skempton, A. W. (2002). A Biographical Dictionary of Civil Engineers in Great Britain and Ireland: 1500–1830. Thomas Telford. ISBN 978-0-7277-2939-2.
- Stephen, Sir Leslie (1885). Dictionary of National Biography, ed. by L. Stephen (and S. Lee). (All 63 volumes available (1885–1900) in Wikisource, with some of the supplement volumes)
- Oxford Dictionary of National Biography (online) (subscription required)
- Stewart, William. British and Irish poets: a biographical dictionary, 449-2006. McFarland, 2007. ISBN 9780786428915.
- Thrope, Arthur Winton (1921). Burke's Handbook to the Most Excellent. London: Burke.
- Todd, Janet M. A dictionary of British and American women writers, 1660–1800. Rowman and Allanheld, 1985. ISBN 0847671259.
- Treasure, Geoffrey, Ian Dawson. Who's who in British history: Beginnings to 1901. Fitzroy Dearborn, 1998. ISBN 1884964907.
- Valentine, Alan Chester. The British establishment, 1760–1784: An eighteenth-century biographical dictionary. University of Oklahoma Press, [1970]. ISBN 0806108770.
- Ward, Thomas Humphrey (1885). Men of the Reign. London: Routledge.
- Who's Who. London: Black. 1849.

====== England ======
- Boase, Frederic (1892–1921). Modern English Biography. Truro: Netherton.
- Kirk, John (1909). Biographies of English Catholics in the Eighteenth Century. London: Burns.
- Oldfield, Sybil. Collective biography of women in England, 1550–1900: A select annotated bibliography. Mansell, 1999. ISBN 0720123216.
- Robin, Diana Maury, Anne R. Larsen, Carole Levin. Encyclopedia of women in the Renaissance: Italy, France, and England. ABC-CLIO, 2007. ISBN 1851097724.
- Talbot, C. H., Eugene Ashby Hammond. The medical practitioners in medieval England: A biographical register. Wellcome Historical Medical Library, 1965.

====== Northern Ireland ======
- Newmann, Kate. Dictionary of Ulster biography. Ulster History Circle, 2007-. Available online here.
- Who's who in Northern Ireland. Inglewood Books, 1998–. ISBN 0953212475.

====== Scotland ======
- Anderson, William (1878–1880). The Scottish Nation. Edinburgh: Fullarton.
- Ewan, Elizabeth, Sue Innes, Siân Reynolds, Rose Pipes. The biographical dictionary of Scottish women: from the earliest times to 2004. Edinburgh University Press, 2006. ISBN 0748617132.
- Goring, Rosemary. Chambers Scottish biographical dictionary. Chambers, 1992. ISBN 0550160434.
- Dictionary of Scottish Architects (online)
- National Library of Scotland. Scottish book trade index. National Library of Scotland. Available online here.
- Thomson, Thomas (1855). A Biographical Dictionary of Eminent Scotsmen. Blackie.
- Who's who in Scotland. Carrick Media, 1986–. ISBN 9780954663155.

====== Wales ======
- National Library of Wales. Welsh biography online. National Library of Wales, 2004. Available at .

==== Southern Europe ====
- Kramme, U., Ž. Urra Muena. Südosteuropäisches biographisches archiv (SOBA). K. G. Saur, 1998–2004. ISBN 3598341342.

===== Albania =====
- Kramme, U., Ž. Urra Muena. Südosteuropäisches biographisches archiv (SOBA). K. G. Saur, 1998–2004. ISBN 3598341342.

===== Bosnia and Herzegovina =====
- Kramme, U., Ž. Urra Muena. Südosteuropäisches biographisches archiv (SOBA). K. G. Saur, 1998–2004. ISBN 3598341342.

===== Bulgaria =====
- Kramme, U., Ž. Urra Muena. Südosteuropäisches biographisches archiv (SOBA). K. G. Saur, 1998–2004. ISBN 3598341342.

===== Croatia =====
- Kramme, U., Ž. Urra Muena. Südosteuropäisches biographisches archiv (SOBA). K. G. Saur, 1998–2004. ISBN 3598341342.

===== Cyprus =====
- Koudounarēs, Aristeidēs L. Viographikon lexikon Kypriōn, 1800–1920. [s.n.], Typogr. St. Leivadiōtē, 2010. ISBN 9789963785636; ISBN 9963785638.

===== Greece =====
- Bernath, Mathias, Felix von Schroeder. Biographisches Lexikon zur Geschichte Südosteuropas. Oldenbourg, 1970–1981.
- Koukounas, Dēmosthenēs, Natasa Koukouna. Viographikē enkyklopaideia tou neōterou Hellēnismou, 1830–2010: archeia hellēnikēs viographias. Ekdoseis Metron, 2011. ISBN 9789607201799.
- Schmuck, Hilmar. Griechisches biographisches archiv (GBA) or Greek biographical archive. K. G. Saur, 1998–2001. ISBN 3598341946.
- Taylor, Stephen. Who's who in central and east-Europe. Central European Times, 1934–.
- Who's who in Greece. Metron, 1996/97–. ISSN 1108-4294.

===== Italy =====
- Ascarelli, Fernanda. La tipografia cinquecentina italiana. Sansoni antiquariato, 1953. (Italian)
- Cosenza, Mario Emilio. Biographical and bibliographical dictionary of the Italian humanists and of the world of classical scholarship in Italy, 1300–1800. G. K. Hall, [1962]–1967.
- Dell'Arti, Giorgio, Massimo Perrini. Catalogo dei viventi 2009: 7247 italiani notevoli. Marsilio, 2008. ISBN 9788831795999.
- Ghisalberti, Alberto M.; Romanelli, Raffaele, ed. (1960), Dizionario Biografico degli Italiani (Biographical Dictionary of Italians), Rome, Istituto dell'Enciclopedia italiana, 76 volumes covering A-Mor. Free searchable online access is available from Treccani.it. (in Italian)
- Hazel, John. Who's who in the Roman world. Routledge. ISBN 0415224101.
- Mafai, Miriam, Natalia Aspesi. Le Donne italiane: Il chi e del '900. Rizzoli, 1993. ISBN 978-88-17-84229-7. (Italian)
- Manzoni, Cesare. Biografia italica: Saggio bibliografico di opere italiane a stampa per servire alla biografia degli Italiani. Biblio Verlag, 1981. ISBN 3764811943.
- Moroni, Gaetano (1859). Dizionario di erudizione storico-ecclesiastica da S. Pietro sino ai nostri giorni ... (in Italian). Tipografia Emiliana.
- Nappo, Tommaso, Silvio Furlani. Archivio biografico italiano: Cumulativo di 321 repertori biografici fra i più importanti a partire dal sec. XVII sino all'inizio del sec. XX. Saur, 1987–1990. ISBN 3598315201.
- Robin, Diana Maury, Anne R. Larsen, Carole Levin. Encyclopedia of women in the Renaissance: Italy, France, and England. ABC-CLIO, 2007. ISBN 1851097724.
- Roccella, Eugenia, Lucetta Scaraffia. Italiane. Dipartimento per l'informazione e l'editoria, [2004]. (Italian)
- Spreti, Vittorio. Enciclopedia storico-nobiliare italiana. Ed. Enciclopedia storico-nobiliare italiana, 1928–1936.
- Who's who in Italy. Who's Who in Italy S. r. l. Available online here.

===== Macedonia =====
- Bernath, Mathias, Felix von Schroeder. Biographisches Lexikon zur Geschichte Südosteuropas. Oldenbourg, 1970–1981.
- Kramme, U., Ž. Urra Muena. Südosteuropäisches biographisches archiv (SOBA). K. G. Saur, 1998–2004. ISBN 3598341342.
- Roszkowski, Wojciech, Jan Kofman. Biographical dictionary of central and eastern Europe in the twentieth century. M.E. Sharpe, 2008. ISBN 9780765610270.
- Taylor, Stephen. Who's who in central and east-Europe. Central European Times, 1934–.

===== Malta =====
- Schiavone, Michael J. Dictionary of Maltese biographies. Pubblikazzjonijiet Indipendenza, 2009. ISBN 9789993291329.

===== Montenegro =====
- Bernath, Mathias, Felix von Schroeder. Biographisches Lexikon zur Geschichte Südosteuropas. Oldenbourg, 1970–1981.
- Kramme, U., Ž. Urra Muena. Südosteuropäisches biographisches archiv (SOBA). K. G. Saur, 1998–2004. ISBN 3598341342.
- Roszkowski, Wojciech, Jan Kofman. Biographical dictionary of central and eastern Europe in the twentieth century. M.E. Sharpe, 2008. ISBN 9780765610270.
- Taylor, Stephen. Who's who in central and east-Europe. Central European Times, 1934–.

===== Portugal =====
- Mediavilla, Victor Herrero, L. Rosa Aguayo Nayle. Archivo biográfico de España, Portugal e Iberoamérica. New York: K. G. Saur, 1990. ISBN 3598320469.
- Rector, Monica, Fred M. Clark. Portuguese writers. Gale Group, 2004. ISBN 0787668249.

===== Romania =====
- Kramme, U., Ž. Urra Muena. Südosteuropäisches biographisches archiv (SOBA). K. G. Saur, 1998–2004. ISBN 3598341342.

===== Serbia =====
- Bernath, Mathias, Felix von Schroeder. Biographisches Lexikon zur Geschichte Südosteuropas. Oldenbourg, 1970–1981.
- Kramme, U., Ž. Urra Muena. Südosteuropäisches biographisches archiv (SOBA). K. G. Saur, 1998–2004. ISBN 3598341342.

===== Slovenia =====
- Kramme, U., Ž. Urra Muena. Südosteuropäisches biographisches archiv (SOBA). K. G. Saur, 1998–2004. ISBN 3598341342.

===== Spain =====
- Casado, Juan Delgado. Diccionario de impresores españoles, siglos XV-XVII. Arco-Libros, 1996. ISBN 8476351984.
- Contemporary Hispanic biography: profiles from the international Hispanic community. Gale, 2002–. ISSN 1541-1524.
- Mediavilla, Victor Herrero, L. Rosa Aguayo Nayle. Archivo biográfico de España, Portugal e Iberoamérica. New York: K. G. Saur, 1990. ISBN 3598320469.
- Quién es quién en España. Editorial Campillo, 1981–.
- Real Academía de la Historia (2011), Diccionario Biográfico Español (Spanish Biographical Dictionary). ISBN 978-84-96849-56-3 (set of 20 volumes). (in Spanish)
- Who's who in Spain. Who's Who in Italy, 1987–. Available online here.

====== Catalonia ======
- Diccionari biogràfic. Alberti, [1966–1970].

===== Turkey =====
- Bernath, Mathias, Felix von Schroeder. Biographisches Lexikon zur Geschichte Südosteuropas. Oldenbourg, 1970–1981.
- Taylor, Stephen. Who's who in central and east-Europe. Central European Times, 1934–.
- Turkish Cultural Foundation. Who's who in Turkish culture and art. Turkish Cultural Foundation. Available online here.

==== Western Europe ====
===== Belgium =====
- Académie royale des Sciences, des Lettres et des Beaux-Arts de Belgique, ed. (1845). Biographie Nationale et Nouvelle Biographie Nationale numérisées (in French). Brussels: Bruyland-Christophe. The Biographie Nationale, Brussels, 1986, consists of 44 volumes and the Nouvelle Biographie Nationale (2012) of nine volumes. Online access is available. The biography includes famous Belgians and foreigners who played an important role while living in Belgium. Only those who had died before the date of publication are included. Biographie Nationale et Nouvelle Biographie Nationale numérisées. The Biographie Nationale
- Académie royale des Sciences, des Lettres et des Beaux-Arts de Belgique, ed. (1855–1909). Notices biographiques et bibliographiques concernant les membres, les correspondants et les associes (in French). Brussels: Hayez.
- Académie royale des sciences, des lettres et des beaux-arts de Belgique. Nouvelle biographie nationale. Académie royale des sciences, des lettres et des beaux-arts de Belgique: Diffusion, P. Mardaga, 1988–2005.
- Delzenne, Yves-William, Jean Houyoux. Le nouveau dictionnaire des Belges. Le Cri éditions: La Libre Belgique, [1998]. ISBN 2871062129.
- Duverger, Jozef. Nationaal biografisch woordenboek. Paleis der Academiën, 1964–.
- Gorzny, Willi, Willemina van der Meer. Biografisch archief van de Benelux: Archives biographiques des pays du Benelux = Biographical archive of the Benelux countries = Biographisches archiv der Benelux-Länder (BAB). Saur, 1992–1994. (Dutch, French, and German). ISBN 3598326319.
- Makrotest, Cegos. Wie is wie in Vlaanderen. Cegos Makrotest, 1980–.
- Rouzet, Anne, Micheline Colin-Boon. Dictionnaire des imprimeurs, libraires et éditeurs des XVe et XVIe siècles dans les limites géographiques de la Belgique actuelle. B. de Graaf, 1975. ISBN 9060043227.

===== Estonian =====
- Eesti Spordi Biograafiline Leksikon (in Estonian) (online)

===== France =====
- Balteau, J., Michel Prévost, Roman d'Amat, M. Barroux. Dictionnaire de biographie française. Letouzey et Ané, 1933–[2012].
- Caratini, Roger. Dictionnaire des personnages de la Révolution. Le Pré aux Clercs, 1988. ISBN 2714422322.
- Cornevin, Robert, Jacques Serre, Académie des sciences d'outre-mer. Hommes et destins: Dictionnaire biographique d'outre-mer. Académie des sciences d'outre-mer, 1975–2011. ISBN 2900098033.
- Dittmar, Gérald. Dictionnaire biographique illustré de la Commune de Paris de 1871. Dittmar, 2004. ISBN 2951919247.
- Haag, Eugene and Emile Haag (1846–1859). La France Protestante (in French). Paris, Geneva: Cherbuliez.
- Julliard, Jacques, Michel Winock, Pascal Balmand. Dictionnaire des intellectuels francais: Les personnes, les lieux, les moments. Seuil, 2002. ISBN 2020323621. (French)
- Kuscinski, August (1916–1919). Dictionnaire des conventionnels (in French). Paris: Au Siege de la Societe.
- Lafitte, J. Who's who in France. J. Lafitte, 1953–. ISSN 0083-9531.
- Maitron, Jean, Claude Pennetier. Dictionnaire biographique du mouvement ouvrier français. Editions Ouvrières, [1964]–1997. ISBN 2708224247. (French).
- Qui était qui, XXe siècle: Dictionnaire biographique des français disparus ayant marqué le XXe siècle. Éditions Jacques Lafitte, 2005. ISBN 2857840446.
- Renouard, Philippe. Imprimeurs and librairies parisiens du XVIe siècle: Ouvrage publié d'après les manuscrits de Philippe Renouard par le Service des travaux historiques de la ville de Paris avec la concours de Bibliotheque nationale. [Bibliothèque Nationale], 1964–1991.
- Renouard, Philippe, Henri-Jean Martin, Dominique Renouard. Répertoire des imprimeurs parisiens: Libraires et fondeurs de caractères en exercice à Paris au XVIIe siècle. Libr. des arts et métiers-éditions, 1995. ISBN 2854970500.
- Robert, Adolphe, Edgar Bourloton and Gaston Cougny (1891). Dictionnaire des parlementaires francais (in French). Paris: Bourloton.
- Robin, Diana Maury, Anne R. Larsen, Carole Levin. Encyclopedia of women in the Renaissance: Italy, France, and England. ABC-CLIO, 2007. ISBN 1851097724.
- Société Internationale pour l'Étude des Femmes de l'Ancien Régime. Dictionnaire des femmes de l'ancienne France. Société Internationale pour l'Étude des Femmes de l'Ancien Régime. Available online here.

===== Germany =====
- Allgemeine deutsche Biographie (in German). Leipzig: Duncker. 1875–1912.
- Biographisches Jahrbuch und deutscher Nekrolog (in German). Berlin: Reimer. 1897–1917.
- Deutsches biographisches Jahrbuch (in German). Berlin: Deutsche Verlagsanstalt. 1918–1950.
- Gorzny, Willi. Deutsches biographisches archiv: Eine kumulation aus 284 der wichtigsten biographischen nachschlagewerke für den deutschsprachigen bereich. K. G. Saur, 1982–1985. ISBN 9783598304217.
- Hockerts, Hans Günter; Brantl, Markus; Ebneth, Bernhard; Jordan, Stefan: Deutsche Biographie, providing online access to over 21,000 articles from Neue Deutsche Biographie (Hockertsand, Hans Günter, ed., Berlin, Duncker & Humblor, 1953–2010, cf Vol 1, ISBN 978-3-428-00181-1), 26,000 articles from Allgemeine Deutsche Biographie (1912) as well as biographies from other sources. Internet access is coordinated by the Bavarian Academy of Sciences and Humanities and the Bavarian State Library. (in German)
- Keith-Smith, Brian. An encyclopedia of German women writers, 1900–1933: Biographies and bibliographies with exemplary readings. E. Mellen Press, c1997–c1998. ISBN 077348597X.
- Killy, Walther, Rudolf Vierhaus, Dietrich von Engelhardt, Christiane Banerji. Dictionary of German biography. K. G. Saur, 2001–2006. ISBN 9783598232909.
- Biographisch-Bibliographisches Kirchenlexikon online (in German)
- Klee, Ernst. Das Personenlexikon zum Dritten Reich: Wer war was vor und nach 1945? S. Fischer, 2003. ISBN 3100393090.
- NDB ADB deutsche Biographie. Bayerische Staatsbibliothek; Deutsche Nationalbibliothek; Bayerische Akademie der Wissenschaften; Historische Kommission; Duncker & Humblot, 2003. Available online here.
- Stroynowski, Juliusz. Who's who in the socialist countries of Europe: A biographical encyclopedia of more than 12,600 leading personalities in Albania, Bulgaria, Czechoslovakia, German Democratic Republic, Hungary, Poland, Romania, Yugoslavia. K. G. Saur, 1989. ISBN 359810636X.
- Weber, Hermann, Andreas Herbst. Deutsche Kommunisten: biographisches Handbuch 1918 bis 1945. Dietz, 2008. ISBN 9783320021306. (German) Freely available here.
- Wedel, Gudrun. Autobiographien von Frauen: ein Lexikon. Böhlau, 2010. ISBN 9783412205850; ISBN 3412205850.
- Weidmann, Conrad. Deutsche männer in Afrika: Lexicon der hervorragensten deutschen Afrika-forscher, missionare, etc. B. Nöhring, 1894.
- Wer Ist Wer? (in German). Berlin: Arani. 1905.

===== Kosovo =====
- Bernath, Mathias, Felix von Schroeder. Biographisches Lexikon zur Geschichte Südosteuropas. Oldenbourg, 1970–1981.
- Roszkowski, Wojciech, Jan Kofman. Biographical dictionary of central and eastern Europe in the twentieth century. M.E. Sharpe, 2008. ISBN 9780765610270.
- Taylor, Stephen. Who's who in central and east-Europe. Central European Times, 1934–.

===== Liechtenstein =====
- Central European Times. Who's who in Switzerland including the principality of Liechtenstein. Central European Times, 1952–1999. ISSN 0083-9736.
- Löschnigg, Hans. Wer ist wer? Wer tut was?: Handbuch für das Fürstentum Liechtenstein. F.P. van Eck, 1995. ISBN 3905501201.

===== Luxembourg =====
- Gorzny, Willi, Willemina van der Meer. Biografisch archief van de Benelux: Archives biographiques des pays du Benelux = Biographical archive of the Benelux countries = Biographisches archiv der Benelux-Länder (BAB). Saur, 1992–1994. (Dutch, French, and German). ISBN 3598326319.
- Hausemer, Georges. Luxemburger Lexikon: Das Grossherzogtum Von A-Z. Editions G. Binsfeld, 2006. ISBN 2879541565. (German).

===== Netherlands =====
- Aa, Abraham Jacobus van der (1852–1878). Biographisch woordenbook der Nederlanden (in Dutch). Haarlem: Brederode.. Freely available online here.
- Biography Portal of the Netherlands. Instituut voor Nederlandse Geschiedenis [u.a.] 2010-. available here.
- Deel (1978). Biografisch lexicon voor de geschiedenis van het Nederlands protestantisme. Resources Huygens ING.
- Digitaal Vrouwenlexicon van Nederland: informatie over de opmerkelijkste vrouwen uit de geschiedenis van Nederland en zijn overzeese gebiedsdelen van de vroegste tijden tot circa 1850 (Online Dictionary of Dutch Women.). Instituut voor Nederlandse Geschiedenis. [u. a., 2008-. Available online here.
- Gorzny, Willi, Willemina van der Meer. Biografisch archief van de Benelux: Archives biographiques des pays du Benelux = Biographical archive of the Benelux countries = Biographisches archiv der Benelux-Länder (BAB). Saur, 1992–1994. (Dutch, French, and German). ISBN 3598326319.
- Molhuysen, Philip Christiaan, Blok, P. J., and Kossmann, F. K. H. (1911–1937). Nieuw Nederlandsch biograpfisch woordenbook (in Dutch). Leiden: Sijthoff.
- Wie is wie in Nederland. Pragma Nederland, [1984/1988–1994/1996]. ISSN 0920-539X.

===== Portugal =====
- de Oliveira, Leonel, Manuel Alves de Oliveira. Quem é quem: Portugueses célebres. Temas & Debates, 2009. ISBN 9789896440473.

===== Switzerland =====
- Central European Times. Who's who in Switzerland including the principality of Liechtenstein. Central European Times, 1952–1999. ISSN 0083-9736.
- Dictionnaire historique et biographique de la Suisse... Neuchatel: Admin. du Dictionnaire. 1921–1934.
- Killy, Walther, Rudolf Vierhaus, Dietrich von Engelhardt, Christiane Banerji. Dictionary of German biography. K. G. Saur, 2001–2006. ISBN 9783598232909.
- Taylor, Stephen. Who's who in central and east-Europe. Central European Times, 1934–.

=== Oceania ===
- Craig, Robert D., Russell T. Clement. Who's who in Oceania, 1980–1981. Institute for Polynesian Studies, Brigham Young University—Hawaii Campus, 1980.

==== Australasia ====
===== Australia =====
- Arnold, John, Deirdre Morris. Monash biographical dictionary of 20th century Australia. Reed Reference, 1994. ISBN 1875589198.
- Australian dictionary of biography. Australian National University, 2006-. Available online here .
- Australian women's register. Available online here.
- Gillen, Mollie, Yvonne Browning, Michael Flynn. The founders of Australia: A biographical dictionary of the first fleet. Library of Australian History, 1989. ISBN 0908120699.
- Gunew, Sneja Marina. A Bibliography of Australian multicultural writers. Centre for Studies in Literary Education, Humanities, Deakin University, 1992.
- Ritchie, J; Kent, H (1991): Australian Dictionary of Biography. Index Vol 1-12 1788–1939, Melbourne University Publishing, 342 pages. ISBN 978-0-522-84459-7. Online access to all volumes is available free of charge.
- Spurway, John T., Allison Allen. Australian Biographical and Genealogical Record. Society of Australian Genealogists, 1992.
- Walsh, Kay, Joy W. Hooton. Australian autobiographical narratives: An annotated bibliography. Australian Scholarly Editions Centre, University College, ADFA: National Library of Australia, 1993, 1998. ISBN 0642105987.

===== New Zealand =====
- Macdonald, Charlotte, Merimeri Penfold, B. R. Williams. The book of New Zealand women (Ko kui ma te kaupapa.). B. Williams Books, 1991. ISBN 0908912048.
- Orange, Claudia, ed., (2003) Dictionary of New Zealand Biography, Auckland University Press, 5 volumes, over 3,000 biographies. ISBN 978-1-86940-237-2 (Vol 1). Free searchable online access is available.

==== Melanesia ====
===== Fiji =====
- Berwick, Sam. Who's who in Fiji; who was who in Fiji: Fiji's golden book of record. Berwicks, 1990.

==== Polynesia ====
===== French Polynesia =====
====== Tahiti ======
- O'Reilly, Patrick, Raoul Teissier, J. Boullaire. Tahitiens: Répertoire biographique de la Polynésie française. Musée de l'homme, 1975. (French)

===== New Zealand =====
- Macdonald, Charlotte, Merimeri Penfold, B. R. Williams. The book of New Zealand women (Ko kui ma te kaupapa.). B. Williams Books, 1991. ISBN 0908912048.

== Women ==
- Adamson, Lynda G. Notable women in American history: A guide to recommended biographies and autobiographies. Greenwood Press, 1999. ISBN 0313295840.
- Adamson, Lynda G. Notable women in world history: A guide to recommended biographies and autobiographies. Greenwood Press, 1998. ISBN 0313298181.
- Australian women's register. Available online here.
- Ba, Adam Konaré. Dictionnaire des femmes célèbres du Mali: Des temps mythico-légendaires au 26 mars 1991. Editions Jamana, 1993.
- Babcock, Barbara A., Nancy J. Parezo. Daughters of the desert: Women anthropologists and the native American southwest, 1880–1980: An illustrated catalogue. University of New Mexico Press, 1988. ISBN 0826310877.
- Bailey, Martha J. American women in science: a biographical dictionary. ABC-CLIO, 1994. ISBN 0874367409.
- Bailey, Martha J. American women in science: 1950 to the present: a biographical dictionary. ABC-CLIO, 1998. ISBN 0874369215.
- Banks, Olive. The biographical dictionary of British feminists. New York University Press, 1985–1990. ISBN 0814710786.
- Bewley, Aisha Abdurrahman. Muslim women: A biographical dictionary. Ta-Ha, 2004. ISBN 1842000535.
- Booth, Alison. Collective biographies of women: an annotated bibliography. University of Virginia Libraries, 2004-. Available online here.
- Boynton, Victoria, Jo Malin, Emmanuel S. Nelson. Encyclopedia of women's autobiography. Greenwood Press, 2005. ISBN 0313327378.
- Brinker-Gabler, Gisela, Karola Ludwig, Angela Woffen. Lexikon deutschsprachiger Schriftstellerinnen, 1800–1945. Deutscher Taschenbuch Verlag, 1986. ISBN 3423032820. (German).
- Christensen, Karen, Allen Guttmann, Gertrud Pfister. International encyclopedia of women and sports. Macmillan Reference USA, 2001. ISBN 0028649540.
- Cicarelli, James, Julianne Cicarelli. Distinguished women economists. Greenwood Press, 2003. ISBN 9780313303319.
- Claghorn, Charles Eugene. Women composers and hymnists: A concise biographical dictionary. Scarecrow Press, 1984. ISBN 0810816806.
- Claghorn, Charles Eugene. Women composers and songwriters: A concise biographical dictionary. Scarecrow Press, 1996. ISBN 0810831309.
- Clinton, Catherine, Christine A. Lunardini. The Columbia guide to American women in the nineteenth century. Columbia University Press, 2000. ISBN 0231109202.
- Commire, Anne, Deborah Klezmer. Dictionary of women worldwide: 25,000 women through the ages. Thomson Gale, 2007. ISBN 0787675857.
- Commire, Anne, Deborah Klezmer. Women in world history: A biographical encyclopedia. Yorkin / Gale, 1999–2002. ISBN 9780787637361.
- Cortina, Lynn Ellen Rice. Spanish-American women writers: A bibliographical research checklist. Garland, 1983. ISBN 0824092473.
- de Haan, Francisca, Krasimira Daskalova, Anna Loutfi. Biographical dictionary of women's movements and feminisms in Central, Eastern, and South Eastern Europe: 19th and 20th centuries. CEU Press/Central European University Press, 2006. ISBN 9789637326394.
- Dimand, Robert W., Mary Ann Dimand, Evelyn L. Forget. A biographical dictionary of women economists. Edward Elgar, 2000. ISBN 9781852789640.
- Dunford, Penny. A biographical dictionary of women artists in Europe and America since 1850. University of Pennsylvania Press, 1989. ISBN 0812282302.
- Ewan, Elizabeth, Sue Innes, Siân Reynolds, Rose Pipes. The biographical dictionary of Scottish women: from the earliest times to 2004. Edinburgh University Press, 2006. ISBN 0748617132.
- Fairbanks, Carol. Japanese women fiction writers: Their culture and society, 1890s to 1990s: English language sources. Scarecrow Press, 2002. ISBN 0810840863.
- Farris, Phoebe. Women artists of color: A bio-critical sourcebook to 20th century artists in the Americas. Greenwood Press, 1999. ISBN 0313303746.
- Foerstel, Karen. Biographical dictionary of congressional women. Greenwood Press, 1999. ISBN 0313302901.
- Fraire, Osvaldo A. Diccionario biográfico de la mujer en el Uruguay. s.l.: s.n., 1999.
- Gacs, Ute. Women anthropologists: A biographical dictionary. Greenwood Press, 1988. ISBN 0313244146.
- Gaze, Delia, Maja Mihajlovic, Leanda Shrimpton. Dictionary of women artists. Fitzroy Dearborn, 1997. ISBN 1884964214.
- Golemba, Beverly E. Lesser-known women: A biographical dictionary. Lynne Rienner Publishers, 1992. ISBN 1555873014.
- Grattan, Virginia L. American women songwriters: A biographical dictionary. Greenwood Press, 1993. ISBN 0313285101.
- Grinstein, Louise S., Carol A. Biermann, Rose K. Rose. Women in the biological sciences: A biobibliographic sourcebook. Greenwood Press, 1997. ISBN 0313291802.
- Heller, Jules, Nancy Heller. North American women artists of the twentieth century: A biographical dictionary. Garland, 1995. ISBN 0824060490.
- Herman, Kali. Women in particular: An index to American women. Oryx Press, 1984. ISBN 0897740882.
- Hillstrom, Laurie Collier, Kevin Hillstrom, Lucy R. Lippard. Contemporary women artists. St. James Press, 1999. ISBN 1558623728.
- Hine, Darlene Clark. Black women in America. Oxford University Press, 2005. ISBN 9780195156775.
- Hine, Darlene Clark, Kathleen Thompson, Facts on File, Inc. Facts on File encyclopedia of black women in America. Facts on File, Inc., 1997. ISBN 0816034257.
- Hyman, Paul, Deborah Dash Moore, Phyllis Holman Weisbard, American Jewish Historical SOciety. Jewish women in America: An historical encyclopedia. Routledge, 1997. ISBN 0415919363.
- The international who's who of women. Europa Publications Ltd., 1992–. ISSN 0965-3775.
- Ireland, Norma Olin. Index to women of the world from ancient to modern times: Biographies and portraits. F. W. Faxon, 1970. ISBN 0873050975.
- James, Edward T., Janet Wilson James, Paul S. Boyer, Radcliffe College. Notable American Women, 1607–1950: A Biographical Dictionary. Belknap Press of Harvard University Press, 1971. ISBN 0674627318.
- Janik, Vicki K., Del Ivan Janik, Emmanuel S. Nelson. Modern British women writers: An A-to-Z guide. Greenwood Press, 2002. ISBN 0313310300.
- Kanner, Barbara. Women in context: Two hundred years of British women autobiographers, a reference guide and reader. G. K. Hall; Prentice Hall International, 1997. ISBN 081617346X.
- Kaptur, Marcy. Women of Congress: A twentieth-century odyssey. Congressional Quarterly, 1996. ISBN 0871879891.
- Keith-Smith, Brian. An encyclopedia of German women writers, 1900–1933: Biographies and bibliographies with exemplary readings. E. Mellen Press, c1997–c1998. ISBN 077348597X.
- Kersey, Ethel M., Calvin O. Schrag. Women philosophers: a bio-critical source book. Greenwood Press, 1989. ISBN 0313257205.
- Kőhler-Lutterbeck, Monika Siedentopf. Lexikon der 1000 Frauen. Dietz, 2000. ISBN 3801202763. (German).
- Kort, Carol, Liz Sonneborn. A to Z of American women in the visual arts. Facts on File, 2002. ISBN 0816043973.
- Krisman, Carol. Encyclopedia of American women in business: from colonial times to the present. Greenwood Press, 2005. ISBN 9780313327575.
- Kuhlman, Erika A. A to Z of women in world history. Facts on File, 2002. ISBN 0816043345.
- Kuiper, Kathleen. The 100 most influential women of all time. Britannica Educational Pub. : Rosen Educational Services, 2010. ISBN 9781615300105.
- Larsen, Jytte, Grethe Ilsøe, Hanne Rimmen. Dansk kvindebiografisk leksikon. Rosinante, 2000. ISBN 8773579769.
- Law, Cheryl. Women, a modern political dictionary. I.B. Tauris, 2000. ISBN 186064502X.
- Lee, Lily Xiao Hong, A. D. Stefanowska, Sue Wiles. Biographical dictionary of Chinese women. M. E. Sharpe, 1998–2007. ISBN 0765600439.
- Levin, Beatrice. Women and medicine. Scarecrow Press, 2002. ISBN 0810842386.
- Litoff, Judy Barrett, Judith McDonnell. European immigrant women in the United States: A biographical dictionary. Garland Publ., 1994. ISBN 0824053060.
- Macdonald, Charlotte, Merimeri Penfold, B. R. Williams. The book of New Zealand women (Ko kui ma te kaupapa.). B. Williams Books, 1991. ISBN 0908912048.
- Mainiero, Lina. American women writers: A critical reference guide from colonial times to the present. Ungar, c1979–1994. ISBN 0804431515.
- Marting, Diane E. Spanish American women writers: A bio-bibliographical source book. Greenwood Press, 1990. ISBN 0313251940.
- Marting, Diane E. Women writers of Spanish America: An annotated bio-bibliographical guide. Greenwood Press, 1987. ISBN 0313249695.
- Miller, Jane Eldridge. Who's who in contemporary women's writing. Routledge, 2002. ISBN 0415159814.
- O'Connell, Agnes N., Nancy Felipe Russo. Models of achievement: Reflections of eminent women in psychology. Columbia University Press, 1983–2001. ISBN 0231053126.
- O'Dea, Suzanne. From suffrage to the Senate: America's political women: an encyclopedia of leaders, causes & issues. Grey House Publ., 2013. ISBN 9781619250109.
- O'Dea Schenken, Suzanne, Ann W. Richards. From suffrage to the Senate: An encyclopedia of American women in politics. ABC-CLIO, 1999. ISBN 0874369606.
- Ogilvie, Marilyn; Harvey, Joy (16 December 2003). The Biographical Dictionary of Women in Science: Pioneering Lives From Ancient Times to the Mid-20th Century. Routledge. ISBN 978-1-135-96343-9.
- Opfell, Olga S. Women prime ministers and presidents. McFarland, 1993. ISBN 0899507905.
- Oppedisano, Jeannette M. Historical encyclopedia of American women entrepreneurs: 1776 to the present. Greenwood Press, 2000. ISBN 9780313306471.
- Österberg, Carin, Inga Lewenhaupt, Anna-Greta Wahlberg. Svenska kvinnor: Föregångare, nyskapare. Signum, 1990. ISBN 9187896036.
- Palmer, María del Carmen Simón. Escritoras españolas del siglo XIX: Manual bio-bibliográfico. Castalia, 1991. ISBN 8470396005.
- Petteys, Chris. Dictionary of women artists: An international dictionary of women artists born before 1900. G.K. Hall, 1985. ISBN 0816184569.
- Pusch, Luise F. FemBio: Notable women international. Luise F. Pusch, 2006. Available online here.
- Rappaport, Helen. Encyclopedia of women social reformers. ABC-CLIO, 2001. ISBN 1576071014.
- Rayner-Canham, Marelene F., Geoffrey Rayner-Canham. Women in chemistry: Their changing roles from alchemical times to the mid-twentieth century. American Chemical Society; Chemical Heritage Foundation, 1998. ISBN 0841235228.
- Riddle, Larry. Biographies of women mathematicians. Agnes Scott College. Available online here.
- Robin, Diana Maury, Anne R. Larsen, Carole Levin. Encyclopedia of women in the Renaissance: Italy, France, and England. ABC-CLIO, 2007. ISBN 1851097724.
- Ruíz, Vicki, Virginia Sánchez Korrol. Latinas in the United States: A historical encyclopedia. Indiana University Press, 2006. ISBN 0253346800.
- Sadie, Julie Anne, Rhian Samuel. The Norton/Grove dictionary of women composers. W.W. Norton, 1994. ISBN 0393034879.
- Salisbury, Joyce E., Mary Lefkowitz. Encyclopedia of women in the ancient world. ABC-CLIO, 2001. ISBN 1576070921.
- Schlueter, Paul, June Schlueter. An encyclopedia of British women writers. Rutgers University Press, 1998. ISBN 0813525438.
- Schumaher, Schuma, Erico Vital Brazil. Dicionário mulheres do Brasil: De 1500 até a atualidade; Com 270 ilustrações. J. Zahar Editor, 2000. ISBN 8571105731.
- Scrivener, Laurice, J. Suzanne Barnes. A biographical dictionary of women healers: Midwives, nurses, and physicians. Oryx Press, 2002. ISBN 157356219X.
- Seller, Maxine. Women educators in the United States, 1820–1993: A bio-bibliographical sourcebook. Greenwood Press, 1994. ISBN 0313279373.
- Shattock, Joanne. The Oxford guide to British women writers. Oxford University Press, 1993. ISBN 0192141767.
- Shearer, Benjamin F., Barbara Smith Shearer. Notable women in the life sciences: a biographical dictionary. Greenwood Press, 1996. ISBN 0313293023.
- Sheldon, Kathleen E. Historical dictionary of women in sub-Saharan Africa. Scarecrow Press, 2005. ISBN 0810853310.
- Sherrow, Victoria. A to Z of American women business leaders and entrepreneurs. Facts on File, 2002. ISBN 9780816045563.
- Showalter, Elaine, Lea Baechler, A. Walton Litz. Modern American women writers. Collier Books; Maxwell Macmillan Canada; Maxwell Macmillan International, 1993. ISBN 0020820259.
- Smith, Jessie Carney, Shirelle Phelps. Notable black American women. Gale Research, 1992–2003. ISBN 0810347490.
- Société Internationale pour l'Étude des Femmes de l'Ancien Régime. Dictionnaire des femmes de l'ancienne France. Société Internationale pour l'Étude des Femmes de l'Ancien Régime. Available online here.
- Sweeney, Patricia E. Biographies of British women: An annotated bibliography. ABC-CLIO, 1993. ISBN 0874366283.
- Talhami, Ghada Hashem. Historical dictionary of women in the Middle East and North Africa. Scarecrow Press, 2013. ISBN 9780810868588.
- Todd, Janet M. British women writers: A critical reference guide. Continuum, 1989. ISBN 0804433348.
- Todd, Janet M. A dictionary of British and American women writers, 1660–1800. Rowman and Allanheld, 1985. ISBN 0847671259.
- Uglow, Jennifer S., Frances Hinton, Maggy Hendry. The Palgrave Macmillan dictionary of women's biography. Palgrave Macmillan, 2005. ISBN 1403934487.
- Wedel, Gudrun. Autobiographien von Frauen: ein Lexikon. Böhlau, 2010. ISBN 9783412205850; ISBN 3412205850.
- Welch, Rosanne. Encyclopedia of women in aviation and space. ABC-CLIO, 1998. ISBN 0874369584.
- Windsor, Laura Lynn. Women in medicine: An encyclopedia. ABC-CLIO, 2002. ISBN 1576073920.

== See also ==
- Bibliography of encyclopedias
- Biographical dictionary

== Bibliography ==
- Guide to Reference. American Library Association. Retrieved 5 December 2014. (subscription required).
- Kroeger, Alice Bertha, Isadore Gilbert Mudge. (1911). Guide to the Study and Use of Reference books. Chicago: American Library Association.
- Sheehy, Eugene P., ed. (1986). Guide to Reference Books (Tenth ed.). Chicago and London: American Library Association. ISBN 978-0-8389-0390-2.
