= Olive Banks =

British sociologist and academic

- Born: Olive Davies; 2 July 1923; Enfield Highway, Middlesex, England
- Died: 14 September 2006 (aged 83); Buxton, Derbyshire, England
- Occupations: Educator, researcher
- Spouse: Joseph Banks (m. 1944)

Academic background
- Education: London School of Economics

Academic work
- Discipline: Sociologist
- Sub-discipline: Feminism researcher
- Institutions: Liverpool University; Leicester University

Olive Banks (2 July 1923 – 14 September 2006) was an English professor at Leicester University who worked upon the sociology of education and the history of feminism.

== Early life ==
Banks was born in Enfield Highway, Middlesex, the eldest of two children of Herbert Alfred Davies and Jessie Louise (nee) Tebby. She married Joseph Ambrose (Joe) Banks in June 1944 and they both entered the London School of Economics to study sociology. Her PhD thesis was turned into her first book, Parity and Prestige in English Secondary Education: a Study in Educational Sociology (1955).

== Career ==
In 1954 she accepted a research post at Liverpool University, where she was able to investigate the history of British feminism, culminating in the publishing of Feminism and Family Planning in Victorian England (1964). Her reputation as a leading scholar in her field was sealed with the publication of The Sociology of Education (1965).

In 1970 she was offered a readership at University of Leicester, and three years later became the first woman to hold a chair at that university.

A posthumous review of her life and work, Olive Banks and the Collective Biography of British Feminism, was made by Gaby Weiner.

== Retirement ==
Following her retirement in 1982, she continued her research, publishing a two volume Biographical Dictionary of British Feminists (1985–1990) and Becoming Feminist: The Social Origins of 'First Wave' feminism (1986). The Politics of British Feminism (1993) was her last book.

== Death ==
She died on 14 September 2006 at the age of 83 in Buxton, Derbyshire of a heart attack.

== Sources ==
- Purvis, June (2010-01-09). "Banks [née Davies], Olive Lucy (1923–2006), sociologist, historian, and feminist". Oxford Dictionary of National Biography (online ed.). Oxford University Press. doi:10.1093/ref:odnb/97918. (Subscription, Wikipedia Library access or UK public library membership required.)
