= Antoine Cabaton =

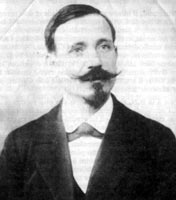
- Born: 11 December 1863; Nérondes
- Died: 25 November 1942 (aged 78); Vannes
- Occupation: Philologist

Antoine Cabaton (11 December 1863 – 25 November 1942) was a French philologist, one of the founders of the insulindian studies. Besides his teaching duties, his researches and publications were devoted not only to language but also religion, history and contemporary issues.

== Bibliography ==
Letter by Cabaton (1920)

- 1901: Nouvelles recherches sur les Chams
- 1906: Dictionnaire cam-français, with Étienne Aymonier, École française d'Extrême-Orient
- 1909: Les Indes néerlandaises, translated into English as soon as 1911
- 1912: Catalogue sommaire des manuscrits indiens, indo-chinois et malayopolynésiens de la Bibliothèque nationale
- 1922: Participation to the L'Encyclopédie de l'Islam
- numerous articles in the Revue du monde musulman from 1906 to 1926, for example :
  - Notes de bibliographie indo-néerlandaise,
  - Les Moros de Soulou et de Mindanao,
  - Un congrès de jeunes Javanais,
  - Les Malais et l'avenir de leur langue.
