= A Biographical Dictionary of the Qin, Former Han and Xin Periods (221 BC – AD 24) =

Biographical dictionary

- First edition cover
- Author: Michael Loewe
- Series: Handbook of Oriental Studies
- Release number: Volume 16, Section 4 (China)
- Subject: Biography; Qin dynasty; Han dynasty; Xin dynasty
- Publisher: Brill
- Publication date: 2000
- Media type: Print (hardback)
- Pages: 837
- ISBN: 90-04-10364-3
- Website: brill.com/display/title/6758

A Biographical Dictionary of the Qin, Former Han and Xin Periods (221 BC – AD 24) is a biographical dictionary by Michael Loewe. It was published by Brill in 2000 as volume 16 in section 4 (China) of their Handbook of Oriental Studies series.

== Synopsis ==
The dictionary starts with an introduction that sets out the scope of the work, its relationship to Rafe de Crespigny's companion volume A Biographical Dictionary of Later Han to the Three Kingdoms (23–220 AD), and some notes on sourcing, both from literary records such as the Shiji and the Hanshu, and more recent material records from archeological research. The bulk of the work comprises more than 6,000 biographies of persons named in the various sources. After the biographies proper, the back matter contains a list of official titles, eight genealogical tables, detailed lists of major administrative divisions (the metropolitan area, kingdoms, provinces and commanderies), nine maps, a list of source materials cited in the dictionary, and a table of emperors.

== Development ==
Loewe formally started on the dictionary in 1994, though it reflects his lifetime's research and scholarship on early China. In contrast to similar endeavours in the second half of the 20th century (for example, Goodrich and Fang's Dictionary of Ming Biography, 1368–1644 and Hummel's Eminent Chinese of the Ch'ing Period), which were the collective output of a number of scholars, Loewe was the sole author of the dictionary. Retired, Loewe was unable to take on writing the companion volume covering the Later Han himself, but asked de Crespigny to undertake this instead.

== Reception ==
The dictionary was met with considerable acclaim. Paul Kroll, professor of Chinese at the University of Colorado Boulder, praised it as "magnificent in its breadth and usefulness" and "a work of consummate mastery", and approved of the overall coherence of the work, thanks to Loewe's sole authorship. Nathan Sivin noted Loewe's careful, exact writing and use of sources other than the official histories to write biographies that went beyond the "scanty, stereotyped entries" in other works, but deplored Brill's "truly rapacious price". Michael Nylan considered it "an unexpected boon of inestimable worth", better than any comparable work in terms of its breadth and depth, the variety of sources used, and the useful context provided by both the introduction and the summaries of events during each emperor's reign.

== Sources ==
- Loewe, Michael (2000). A Biographical Dictionary of the Qin, Former Han and Xin Periods (221 BC – AD 24). Brill. ISBN 90-04-10364-3. Full access available to users of The Wikipedia Library.
- de Crespigny, Rafe (2006). A Biographical Dictionary of Later Han to the Three Kingdoms (23–220 AD). Brill. ISBN 978-90-04-15605-0. Full access available to users of The Wikipedia Library.
- Kroll, Paul W. (2002). "Review of A Biographical Dictionary of the Qin, Former Han and Xin Periods (221 B.C.-A.D. 24)". Journal of the American Oriental Society. 122 (1): 143–145. doi:10.2307/3087691. ISSN 0003-0279. JSTOR 3087691. Full access available to users of The Wikipedia Library.
- Sivin, Nathan (2001). "Review of A Biographical Dictionary of the Qin, Former Han and Xin Periods (221 B.C.—A.D. 24). Handbuch der Orientalistik, pt. 4, vol. 16". China Review International. 8 (2): 465–468. ISSN 1069-5834. JSTOR 23732078. Full access available to users of The Wikipedia Library.
- Nylan, Michael (2001). "Review of A Biographical Dictionary of the Qin, Former Han, and Xin Periods (221 BC-AD 24)". Journal of the Royal Asiatic Society. 11 (3): 403–404. doi:10.1017/S1356186301350344. ISSN 1356-1863. JSTOR 25188193. Full access available to users of The Wikipedia Library.
- Hinsch, Bret (2009). "The Genre of Women's Biographies in Imperial China". Nan Nü. 11 (1): 102–123. doi:10.1163/138768009X12454916571841. Full access available to users of The Wikipedia Library.
