= Thomas Goodrich =

Thomas Goodrich may refer to:

- Thomas Goodrich (bishop) (died 1554), English bishop of Ely
- Thomas Goodrich (cricketer) (c. 1823–1885), English cricketer
- Thomas Day Goodrich (1927–2015), American historian of the Ottoman Empire
- Thomas Goodrich (historian, born 1947) (1947–2024), American historical writer, mainly on the Old West
