= Personal name of the Longqing Emperor =

Name of the Chinese emperor

A page from the 1548 edition of the Huangming zhaoling containing the 1539 Edict on the Investiture of the Heir Apparent and the Enfeoffment of Two Princes that granted the future Longqing Emperor the title Prince of Yu, in which his personal name was recorded as "Zaiji".

The personal name of the Longqing Emperor, the 13th emperor of the Ming dynasty of China, was Zhu Zaiji, (Note: Simplified Chinese: 朱载坖; traditional Chinese: 朱載坖; pinyin: Zhū Zàijì) but it was later widely recorded as Zhu Zaihou. (Note: Simplified Chinese: 朱载垕; traditional Chinese: 朱載垕; pinyin: Zhū Zàihòu) Contemporary sources, including the Ming Veritable Records and the Korean Veritable Records of the Joseon Dynasty, record his personal name as Zaiji, while some later Ming and Qing historical works adopted the variant Zaihou. Many modern Chinese and Western works have since followed this variant.

== Name ==
The Longqing Emperor (r. 1567–1572) was the 13th emperor of the Ming dynasty of China. He was born on 4 March 1537 as the third son of the Jiajing Emperor. On 8 June of the same year, his father named him Zaiji (載坖). In 1539, the Emperor granted Zhu Zaiji the title Prince of Yu (裕王), which he held until his accession to the throne in 1567. He reigned under the era name "Longqing" (隆慶) until his death in 1572, after which he was known by the temple name Muzong (穆宗). According to Wanli yehuo bian (萬曆野獲編), the Longqing Emperor had the courtesy name Shunzhai. (Note: Simplified Chinese: 舜斋; traditional Chinese: 舜齋; pinyin: Shùnzhāi)

The Veritable Records of Muzong, the official records of the Longqing Emperor's reign, do not record his personal name. However, the Veritable Records of Shizong, the official records of the Jiajing Emperor's reign, record the Longqing Emperor's personal name as "Zaiji". The official Chen Yiqin (陳以勤) explained that the character ji (坖) in the Longqing Emperor's name combines yuan (元) and tu (土), (Note: Simplified Chinese: 从元从土; traditional Chinese: 從元從土; pinyin: cóng yuán cóng tǔ) as if to say "to stand foremost above the Nine Provinces". The 1539 Edict on the Investiture of the Heir Apparent and the Enfeoffment of Two Princes (立皇太子並封二王詔), preserved in the 1548 Zhejiang Provincial Administration edition of the Huangming zhaoling (皇明詔令), explicitly recorded the Longqing Emperor's personal name as "Zaiji", as did the Korean Veritable Records of the Joseon Dynasty.

Several unofficial histories compiled during the Wanli era (1572–1620) also recorded the Longqing Emperor's personal name as "Zaiji", such as Mingshanzang (名山藏), Liangchao xianzhang lu (兩朝憲章錄), and Huang Ming Zhaoling biannian xinshi (皇明昭陵編年信史). However, another Wanli-era work, the Zhangzhong yuzhou (掌中宇宙), recorded his name as Zaihou (載垕). A contemporary of the Longqing Emperor bore the name Zhu Zaihou: the Prince Anhe of Qidong (齊東安和王). The name Zaihou was later adopted by several privately compiled histories, including Ming dazheng ji (明大政紀), Huang Ming dazheng ji (皇明大政紀), and Guoque (國榷). Some privately compiled histories from the early Qing dynasty used both names interchangeably. Mingshu (明書) recorded "Zaihou" in its annals section, while its treatises section recorded "Zaiji". The Annals of Shizong in the Zuiweilu (罪惟錄) recorded "Zaiji", whereas the Annals of Muzong section used "Zaihou". In the History of Ming, the official history of the Ming dynasty compiled by the succeeding Qing dynasty, the Annals of Muzong formally adopted the name "Zaihou". The biography of Chen Yiqin in the same work also changes Chen's explanation of the character in the Longqing Emperor's name from "consisting of yuan and tu" to "consisting of hou (后) and tu (土)", (Note: Simplified Chinese: 从后从土; traditional Chinese: 從后從土; pinyin: cóng hòu cóng tǔ) which forms the character 垕. Many modern Chinese and Western works have followed the "Zaihou" reading. For example, Mingchao diwang ling (明朝帝王陵), Dictionary of Ming Biography, 1368–1644, The Cambridge History of China, Chronicle of the Chinese Emperors: The Reign-By-Reign Record of the Rulers of Imperial China, and Imperial China: 900–1800.
