= Kitab-ı Bahriye =

16th-century Ottoman manuscript

Kitab-ı Bahriye كتاب بحریه
- Topkapı Palace, Istanbul
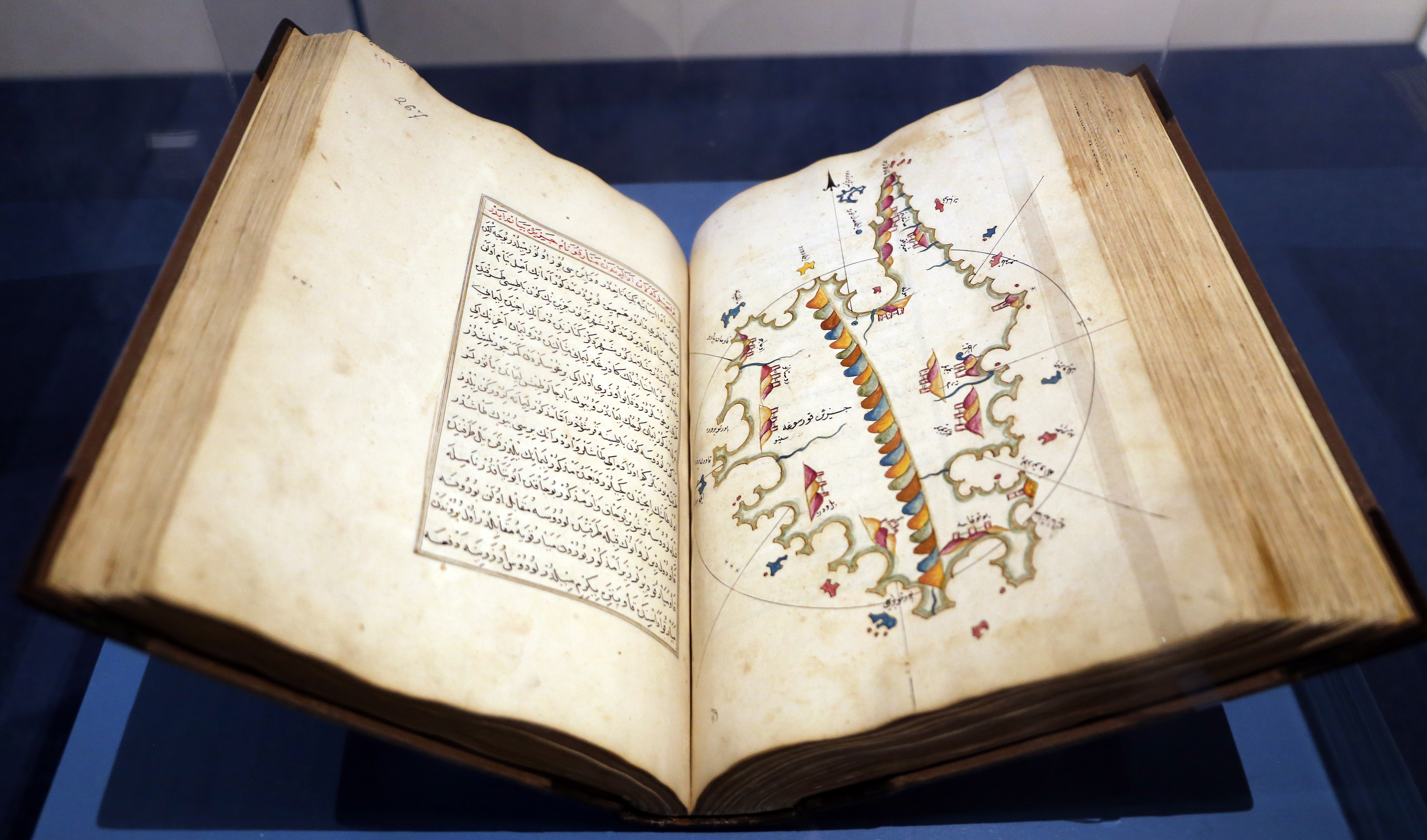
- A copy open to the page on Corsica
- Date: 1521, 1526
- Place of origin: Gallipoli, Ottoman Empire
- Language: Ottoman Turkish
- Author: Piri Reis
- Dedicated to: Suleiman the Magnificent
- Material: Paper

The Kitab-ı Bahriye (Ottoman Turkish: كتاب بحریه, lit. 'Book of the Sea') is a navigational guide written by Piri Reis, an Ottoman cartographer, corsair, and captain. He compiled charts and notes from his career at sea into the most detailed portolan atlas of the Mediterranean Sea in existence. The Kitab-ı Bahriye combines information from a range of sources and Piri Reis' personal experience. The coast of North Africa relies little on outside sources. The book is also one of the few primary sources of information on Piri Reis.

There are two versions of the book. The first version was composed between 1511 and 1521, and presented as a gift to the sultan Suleiman the Magnificent. The second, expanded version was produced as a commission for Ottoman Grand Vizier Pargalı İbrahim Pasha, and completed in 1526.

Both versions begin with a preface and were dedicated to the sultan Suleiman. The main part of both versions is a nautical atlas to the Mediterranean Sea. Separate chapters cover different locations with corresponding portolan charts. Piri Reis says he composed an atlas with separate maps and charts because the details in any single map are limited by the space available. There are 130 chapters in the first version and 210 in the second. The chapters start at the Dardanelles and move counter-clockwise around the Mediterranean. The maps have compass roses indicating North for each page. Scale is indicated only in the textual descriptions, not with scale bars. Standard portolan symbols indicate hazards, like dots for shallow water and crosses for rocks. Written when Ottoman sailors relied on oar-driven galleys and galiots, the Kitab-ı Bahriye reflects their needs and capabilities. It gives information on coastal waters, safe harbors, hazards, and sources of fresh water.

The second version also includes a longer introduction written in verse. It offers information on storms, winds, navigating with a compass, navigating by the stars, reading portolan charts, and the oceans. It discusses recent Portuguese and Spanish voyages including the voyages of Christopher Columbus to the Americas and Vasco da Gama's discovery of a sea route to India. The description of the Americas also includes fantastical hearsay. The book offers the first detailed Ottoman description of the Indian Ocean, with special attention given to Hormuz.

The book achieved fame only after the death of its author. The known surviving manuscripts are all copies created after 1550. At least some portion of the book has been translated into English, modern Turkish, Greek, French, German, and Italian.

== Composition ==
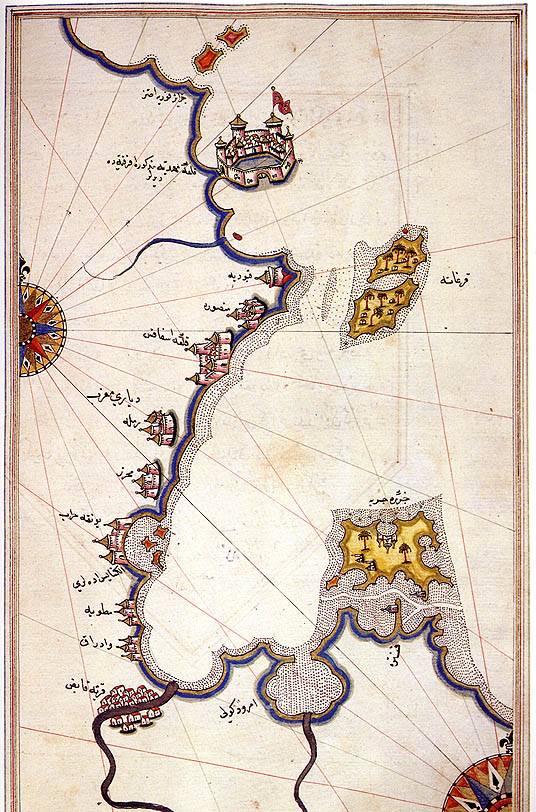
Djerba on the North African coast

From an early age, Piri Reis sailed with his uncle Kemal Reis, first as corsairs in the western Mediterranean, and later in the Ottoman Navy. After his uncle died, Piri Reis returned to his hometown of Gallipoli in 1511. He created his first world map and likely began compiling the notes and charts that would form the basis of the Kitab-ı Bahriye. Piri Reis rejoined the Ottoman Navy for the Ottoman–Mamluk War (1516–1517) and presented the world map to Selim I in 1517. In the following decade, Piri Reis completed two versions of the Kitab-ı Bahriye and a second world map.

When Suleiman the Magnificent began his reign in 1520, Ottoman craftsmen offered exemplars of their work as gifts. The Kitab-ı Bahriye's preface reads, "The reason for compiling this book is that a number of master craftsmen have now brought forward offerings from their various trades to the auspicious threshold and felicitous gate of His Majesty the World-protecting Emperor, so as to gain high status in society and attain name and renown through the matchless favor of that well-favored sovereign." There's no evidence that the first version received a positive or enthusiastic response from the sultan.

The second version was drafted after Piri Reis took the Ottoman Grand Vizier Pargalı İbrahim Pasha to Egypt. Ibrahim rode aboard the navy's flagship, commanded by Piri Reis, when putting down Hain Ahmed Pasha's rebellion in Egypt. During the trip, they took shelter at Rhodes to wait out a storm. They discussed the original Kitab-ı Bahriye and other charts on the ship. Ibrahim commissioned Piri Reis to create an expanded version of the Kitab-ı Bahriye. He did so and presented it to the Sultan by 1526.

Whenever I fell into distress at sea, I always consulted a book. The [sailing] directions that I had written down in [this] book of mine amply demonstrated the excellence of my expertise. His excellency the great Pasha saw how my book was being put to use all the time. He understood that there was something valuable there, and he [expressed] a wish to examine it. When it was brought to him he looked at its every detail and [realized] how I was plotting the course with it. He thus grasped its gist…; he knew that there was accuracy, mastery in the art of navigation [contained in my book]… [and] he showed esteem for this slave of his as a result. … He said, 'You are a very able man, and there is much excellence in your character. The entire configuration of the sea has become known [to you]: none of its spots are hidden from you. I wish that you make all of it manifest, and that you be remembered by it until doomsday. You should polish up this book well, all of it, so that it may be much used… Moreover, this book is very appealing, fit for being preserved in libraries. Polish it up and bring it without fail, so that we may present it to the sovereign of the world.'

— Piri Reis, Kitab-ı Bahriye (1526), preface, Svat Soucek (trans.)

There is no evidence that the Kitab-ı Bahriye circulated outside of the royal palace prior to 1550. From 1560 to 1600, many copies were created and spread. At least 15 surviving manuscripts are from this period. The total number of copies may have reached into the hundreds. There was a greater demand for Turkish geographical texts in the late sixteenth century than during Piri Reis' own life.

== Contents ==
=== Format and organization ===
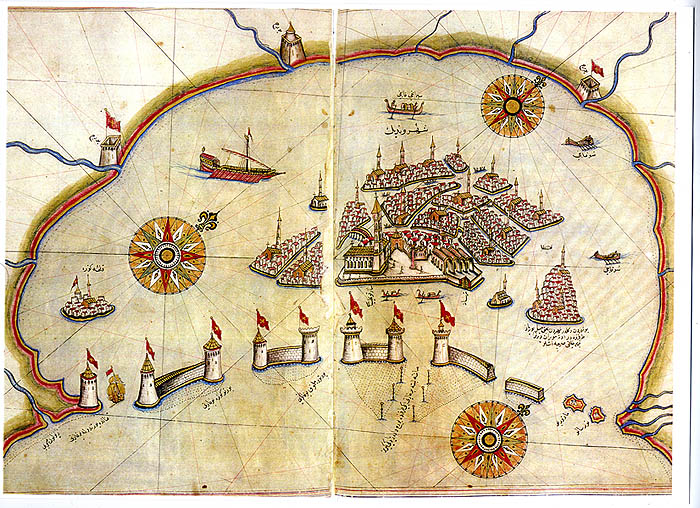
Venice, second version, Istanbul University Library Turkey, manuscript Türkçe 6605

The Kitab-ı Bahriye is a portolan atlas that offered the most detailed navigational guide to the Mediterranean Sea for its time. Like portolan maps, the Kitab-ı Bahriye uses compass roses for navigation, rather than lines of longitude and latitude. Arrows on each chart indicate North. There are no visual scale bars; distances are explained in the prose. The maps use standard symbols like dots for shallow water and crosses for rocks. Compared to inscriptions on contemporary maps, the book is highly personal and anecdotal.

The details in a portolan chart were limited by the space available on the map. Piri Reis says this is why he used separate maps and prose descriptions. The books combine information from a range of sources and his personal experience. The areas that most reflect Piri Reis' direct experiences are the coasts of North Africa. Tunisia is likely drawn from personal observations. Djerba, in particular, includes greater detail than the highly-regarded maps Giacomo Gastaldi composed in sixteenth-century Italy.

The isolario genre was a major influence on Piri Reis. Isolarios were books with written descriptions and maps. Typically written for amusement, they contained minimal guidance on navigation and focused on history and topography. An isolario—like Benedetto Bordone's The Book of Islands compiled in Venice around the same time as the Kitab-ı Bahriye—was divided into chapters with maps of the locations described. Historian Thomas Day Goodrich has argued that the Kitab-ı Bahriye introduced the technique of referring to the maps from within the book's text. Prose portions of the Kitab-ı Bahriye refer the reader to specific maps for details or a better understanding of the geography.

=== Subjects covered ===
The Kitab-ı Bahriye's charts begin at the Dardanelles strait and move counter-clockwise around the Mediterranean. Like other Ottoman atlases, the Kitab-ı Bahriye focuses more on warfare and raiding than trade routes. Piri Reis sailed, raided, and fought as a ghazi and corsair, so he wrote from this perspective.

The Kitab-ı Bahriye is a practical navigation guide, and the sixteenth-century Ottoman fleet relied mainly on galleys and galiots. These ships could be propelled by sails or oars. The Kitab-ı Bahriye reflects their capabilities and is written for a captain making a series of short coastal voyages. The length of galleys combined with their low freeboard made them quick but susceptible to storms and high winds. The Kitab-ı Bahriye gives information on coastal waters, hazards, and safe harbors. The most commonly depicted watercraft is the galley, but the Kitab-ı Bahriye also frequently mentions sandals, a type of small rowing boat. A sandal could be carried or pulled by a galley and rowed to shore for scouting or gathering fresh water. Galleys needed to frequently stop for supplies, and the Kitab-ı Bahriye notes where fresh water can be found. For example, in the section covering the Galite Islands, the Kitab-ı Bahriye notes the dangers posed by southern winds, the availability of wild goats, and the quality of the fresh water which Piri Reis compares in flavor to rose water.

Ottoman naval warfare during the period was often amphibious, involving the transport of troops from land under Ottoman control. The Kitab-ı Bahriye gives details about land-based fortifications, including their current condition. A 2020 analysis of two copies found each depicted over 100 fortified towns, over 800 fortresses, about 390 towers, just over 100 ruins, 148 ports, and about 200 fresh-water springs. The detailed section on Venice explains how the city—built on piles in a lagoon—lacked drinking water and had to ship it in from rivers on the mainland. When discussing the Strait of Messina between Sicily and Europe, Piri Reis explains how the harbor at Messina was protected in medieval times by a submerged chain that could be raised from Forte del Santissimo Salvatore and pulled taut across the harbor by night or during times of conflict:

If one shouted on a calm day, from [Sicily] it would be audible on the coast of Calabria. This place is called the strait of Messina and Messina is a big castle situated on a flat place on the island. In front of the castle is a nice, natural harbour that measures four miles in circumference inside and varies in depth from thirty to forty fathoms. A chain is stretched across the mouth of this harbour and at either end of it there is a tower.

— Piri Reis, Kitab-ı Bahriye (1526), Sicily, Ibrahim Yilmaz (trans.)

The Kitab-ı Bahriye is one of the few sources of biographical information on Piri Reis. The book includes first-hand information from Piri Reis' own sailing and his early experiences with his uncle in the Western Mediterranean. It contains autobiographic information up to 1526, the year the final version was presented to the sultan.

== Variations between versions ==
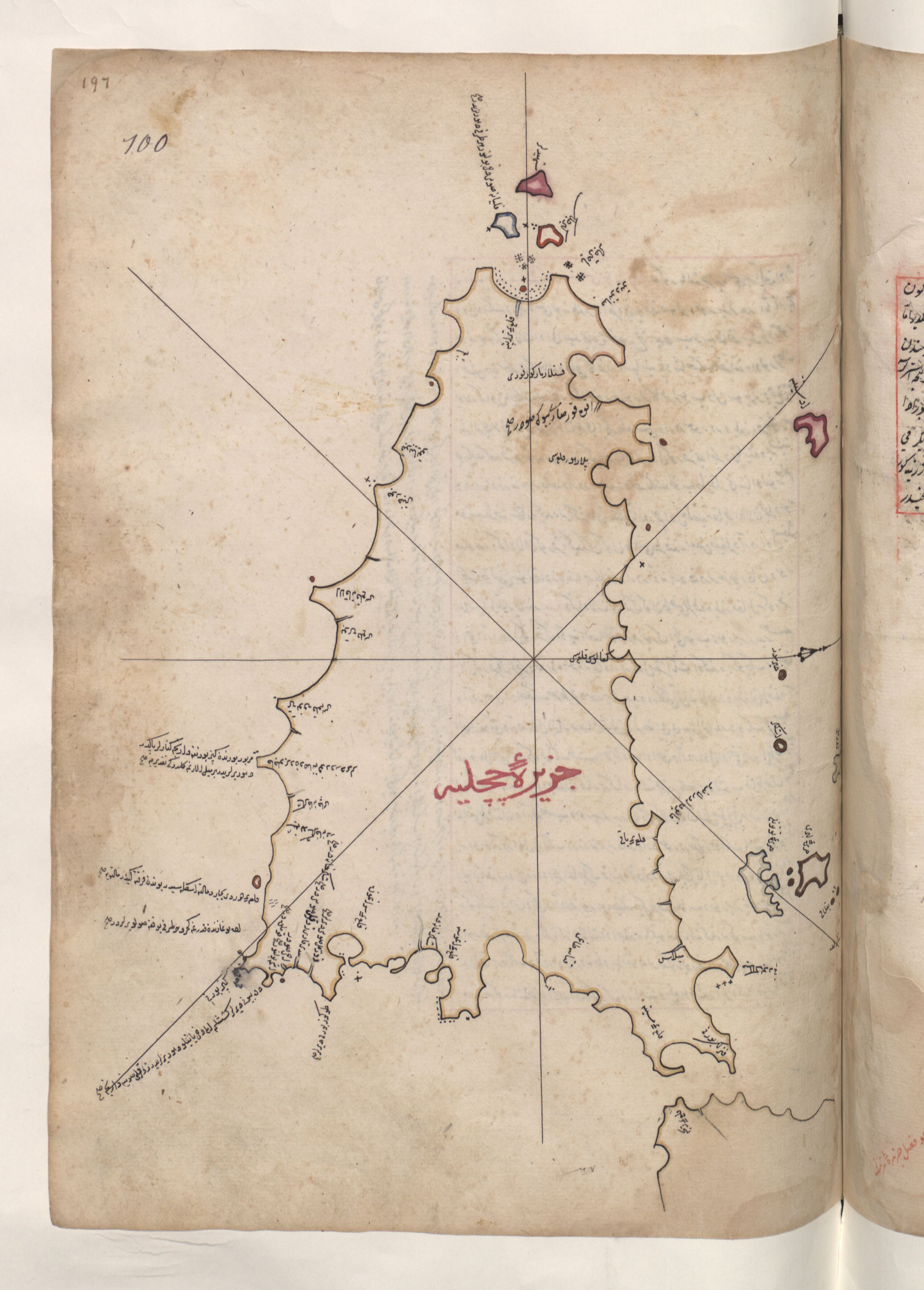
First version, Sicily, Bibliothèque nationale manuscript turc 220, copied late sixteenth or seventeenth century

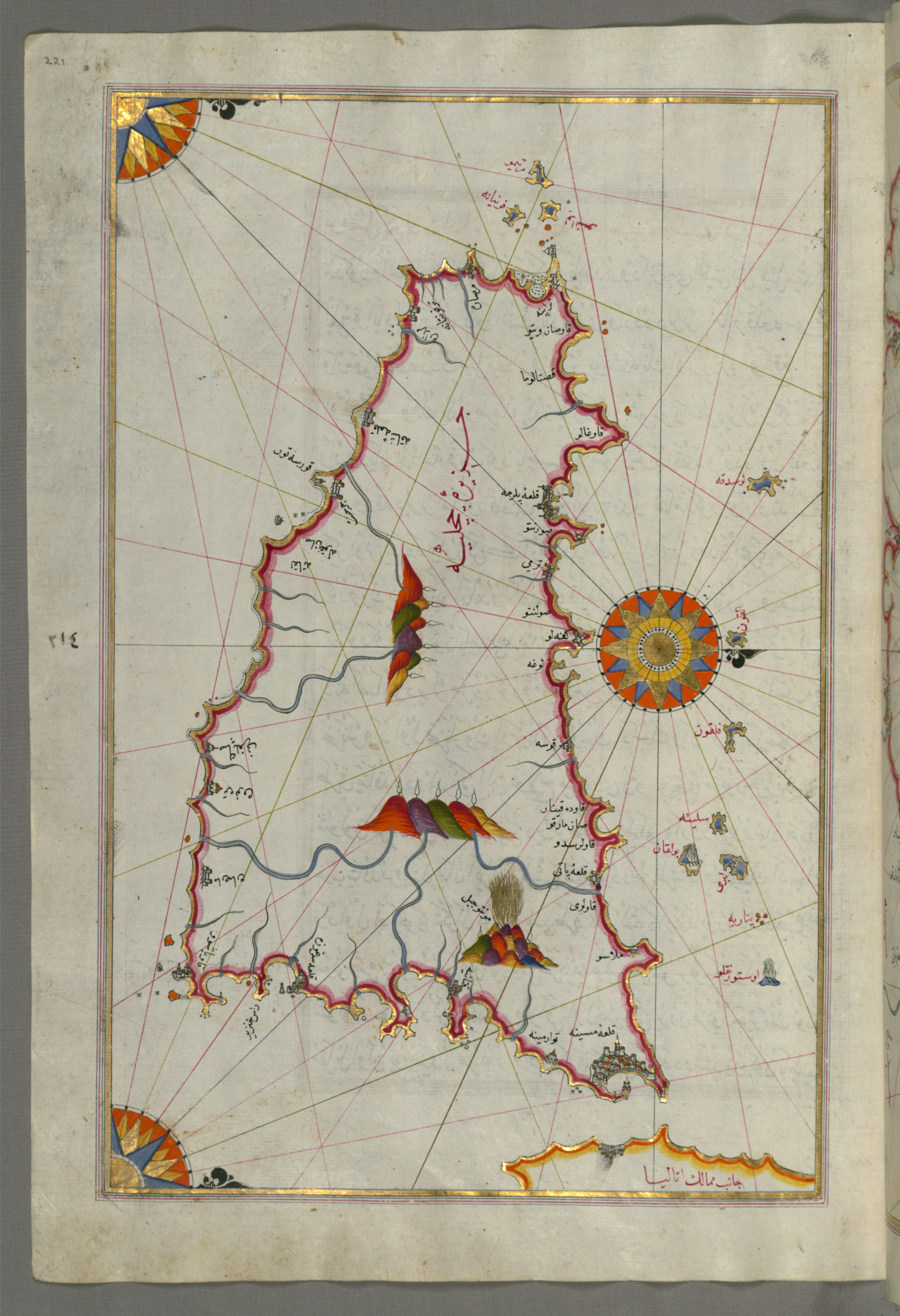
Second version, Sicily, Walters manuscript, copied in the 17th century

Piri Reis produced two versions of the book, an initial 1521 version with 130 chapters and a second 1526 version with 210 chapters. The original version is less artistic but more practical; it saw use by later sailors. The second version includes more detailed maps decorated with Ottoman miniatures.

The first version begins with a standard Ottoman introduction offering praise to Allah and Muhammad along with an explanation of the book's purpose. The 1526 version includes a longer introduction and an added epilogue, both written in verse. The longer preface adds details about recent Portuguese and Spanish voyages around Africa and to the Americas, as well as the first detailed Ottoman description of the Indian Ocean. It gives special attention to Hormuz, a strategically valuable port at the entrance to the Persian Gulf. The description of the Americas includes fantastical hearsay; it describes natives with massive flat faces and the width of an entire hand between their eyes. It also includes Piri Reis' own experiences taking exotic American items from European sailors. The epilogue covers how the second version resulted from discussions with Ibrahim Pasha.

== Extant copies ==
Many copies of both versions have been preserved, but not the originals. Over 40 manuscripts—produced from the late 1500s to the 1700s—survive today, 26 in Istanbul alone. The number of maps varies, and a few have no maps at all. Three copies have no text and only maps. The number of charts in surviving manuscripts varies as some contain additional charts added by copyists. Some later copies have updated maps and depict additional places like the Black Sea which is not covered in the text. The surviving manuscripts contain a total of more than 5,700 maps. According to historian Thomas Day Goodrich, there are more hand-drawn manuscript maps of Piri Reis' work than any other cartographer.

Most extant manuscripts are luxury items, but a few show signs of use at sea. One copy at Kiel University has water stains and marginal notes written by an anonymous mariner. The copies of the more practical 1521 version identify the copyists and the place of production. The copies of the more artistic 1526 version leave out the identity of the copyists. Most copies of the second version were likely created by the miniaturists working in Istanbul during the 1500s and 1600s.

=== Translations and facsimiles ===
At least some portion of the Kitab-ı Bahriye has been translated into German, French, English, Italian, and Greek. Scholarly analysis of the book began with Denis Dominique Cardonne's 1765 French translation. A facsimile of the second version was published in 1935 by the Turkish Historical Society with a complete historical introduction. It was based on the Ayasofya manuscript at the Süleymaniye Library in Istanbul. Eduard Sachau published a study of the Sicily section in 1910. Orientalist Paul E. Kahle began to translate and study a copy of the first version in the 1920s. Uriel Heyd found in a 1956 study that across the many copies "place-names, in particular, were distorted by copyists". More recent scholarship by Dimitris Loupis, Jean-Louis Bacqué-Grammont, and Svat Soucek has worked towards standardizing the placenames.

The Turkish Ministry of Culture and Tourism released a four-volume color facsimile of the book in 1988. It includes a photographic reproduction of the manuscript, a transliteration from the original Arabic script into the Turkish alphabet, and translations into modern Turkish and English.

=== Manuscript copies ===
Copies of the Kitab-ı Bahriye are found in libraries in Istanbul and in some of the major libraries in Europe, besides one copy known to be held privately in the USA (Walters Art Museum).

First version (1521) copies
Place	Institution	Manuscript	Maps	Date	Copyist
Berlin, from Tübingen	Berlin State Library, from University of Tübingen	Ms. Or. Fol. 4133	—	1645	—
Bologna	Bologna University Library	Ms. Marsili 3612	105	—	—
Bologna	Bologna University Library	Ms. 3613	125	1569	—
Dresden	Saxon State and University Library Dresden	Ms. Eb 389	119	1554	—
Istanbul	Istanbul Naval Museum	No. 987	88	—	Mehmed Seyyid
Istanbul	Istanbul Naval Museum	No. 990	134	—	—
Istanbul	Köprülü Library, Fazıl Ahmed Paşa	Ms. 172	123	1657	—
Istanbul	Millet Yazma Eser Kütüphanesi	Coğrafya 1	129	—	—
Istanbul	Nuruosmaniye Library	Ms. 2990	126	1654	Ahmed ibn Mustafa
Istanbul	Nuruosmaniye Library	Ms. 2997	124	1628	Mustafa ibn Muhammad Cündi
Istanbul	Süleymaniye Library	Ms. Aya Sofya 2605	133	1721	Muh. b. Kalgan and Muh. Sadık
Istanbul	Süleymaniye Library	Âşır Efendi 227	92	—	—
Istanbul	Süleymaniye Library	Ms. Aya Sofya 3161	125	—	—
Istanbul	Süleymaniye Library	Hamidiye 945	42	1554–1555	Ahmed ibn 'All ibn Mehmed
Istanbul	Süleymaniye Library	Hüsrev Paşa 272	127	1570	—
Istanbul	Süleymaniye Library	Yeni Cami 790	128	1551	Muhyiddin
Istanbul	Topkapı Palace	Ms. Baghdad 337	134	1574	—
Istanbul	Istanbul University Library	Türkçe 123/2	119	—	—
Kiel	Kiel University Library	Ms. Cod. Or. 34	51	1553–1600	—
London	British Museum	Ms. Oriental 4131	137	1600–1700	—
Oxford	Bodleian Library	Ms. D'Orville 543	—	1587	—
Paris	Bibliothèque nationale	Suppl. Turc 220	122	1553–1700	—
Prague	National Library of the Czech Republic	XVIII A 308	—	—	—
Vienna	Austrian National Library	Ms. Cod. H.O.	130	—	—
—	Originally in the private library of Sir Thomas Phillipps	Ms. 3974	123	1718	—

Second version (1526) copies
Place	Institution	Manuscript	Maps	Date
Baltimore	Walters Art Museum	W.658	239	1600–1700
Berlin	Berlin State Library	Diez A. Fol. 57	50	1600–1700
Istanbul	Atatürk Kitaplığı	Belediye, Muallim Cevdet 30	226	1682
Istanbul	Istanbul Naval Museum	No. 988	239	—
Istanbul	Istanbul Naval Museum	No. 989	226	—
Istanbul	Köprülü Library	Ms. 171	117	1555
Istanbul	Süleymaniye Library	Ayasofya 2612	216	1574
Istanbul	Topkapı Palace	Ms. H. 642	215	1553–1600
Istanbul	Topkapı Palace	R. 1633	221	1600–1700
Istanbul	Istanbul University Library	Türkçe 6605	228	—
Kuwait	Dar al Athar al Islamiyyah	Ms. LNS. 75	131	1689
Paris	Bibliothèque nationale	Suppl. Turc 956	219	1553–1600

Variant copies
Place	Institution	Manuscript	Maps	Variation
Bologna	University of Bologna Library	Ms. Marsili 3609	204	Only maps, no text.
Istanbul	Topkapı Palace	B. 338	189	Only maps, no text.
London	Khalili Collection of Islamic Art	Ms. 718	119	Only maps, no text.
Istanbul	Süleymaniye Library	Hüsrev Paşa 264	0	Text only.
Istanbul	Kandilli Observatory	340/2; f. 25b-69a	0	Text only.

== Maps ==
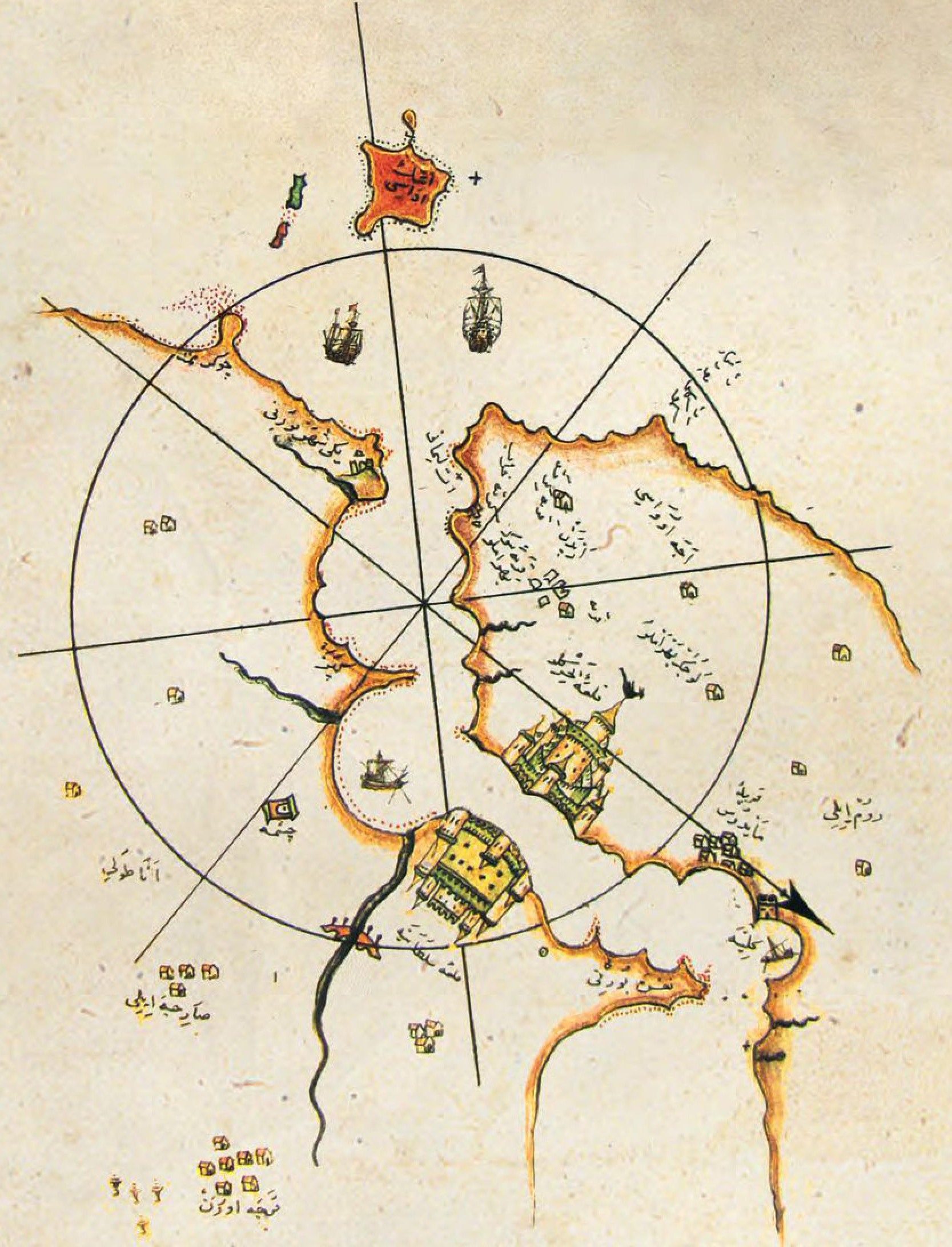
Gallipoli

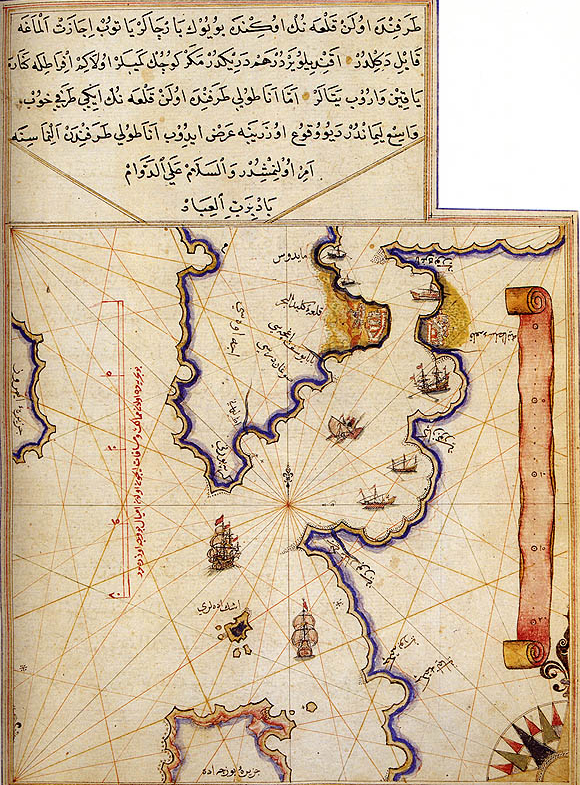
Dardanelles entrance

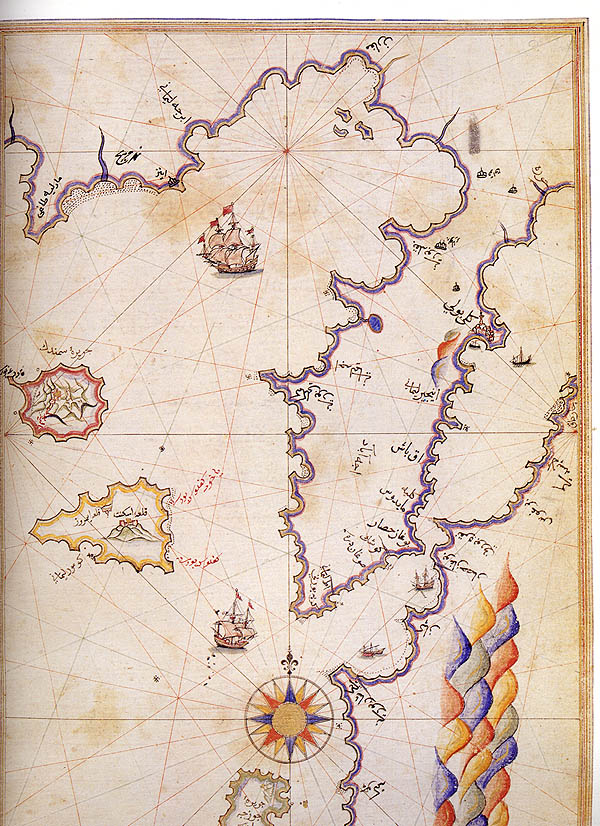
Dardanelles and Gulf of Saros

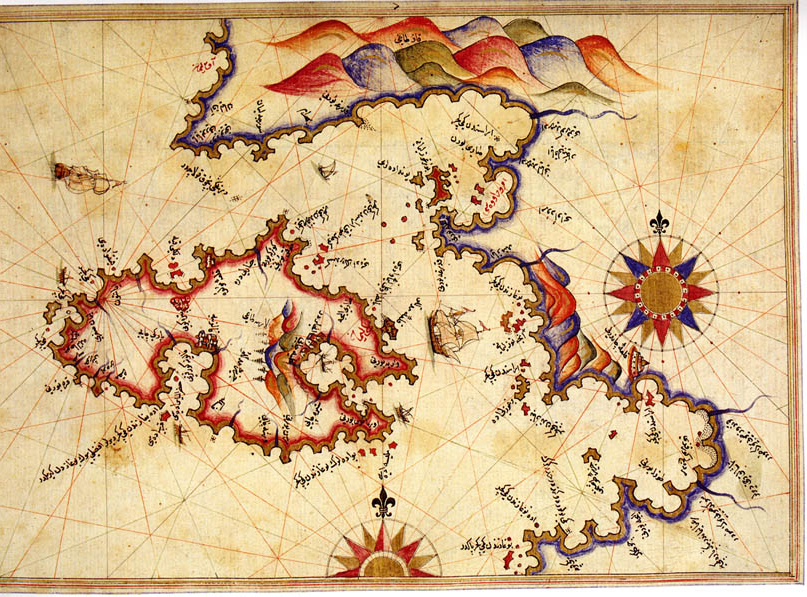
Lesbos and Ayvalık

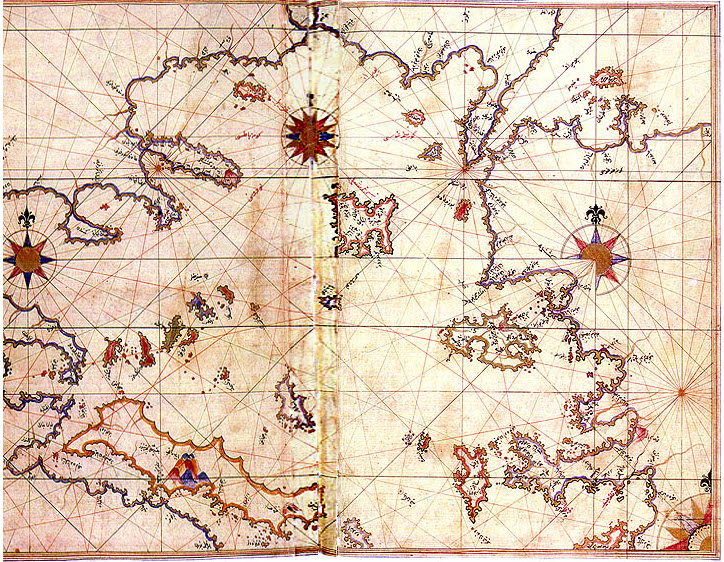
Aegean Sea

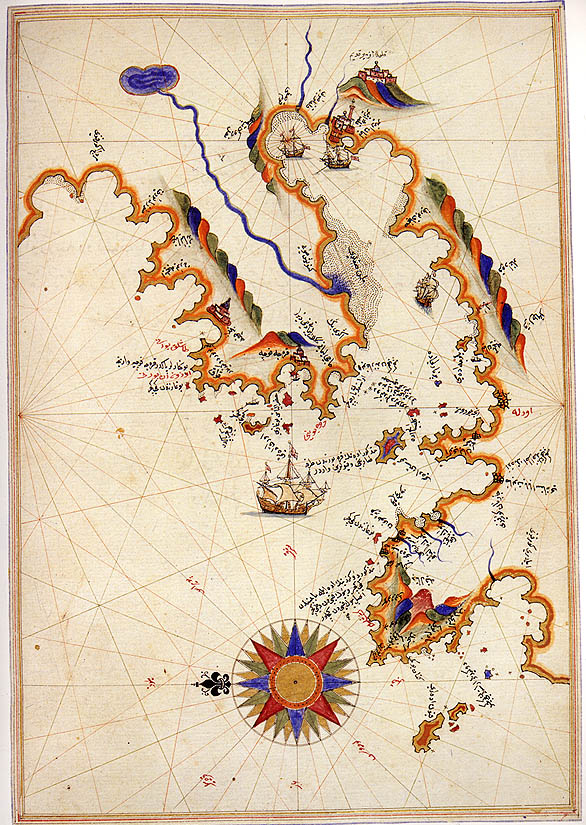
İzmir

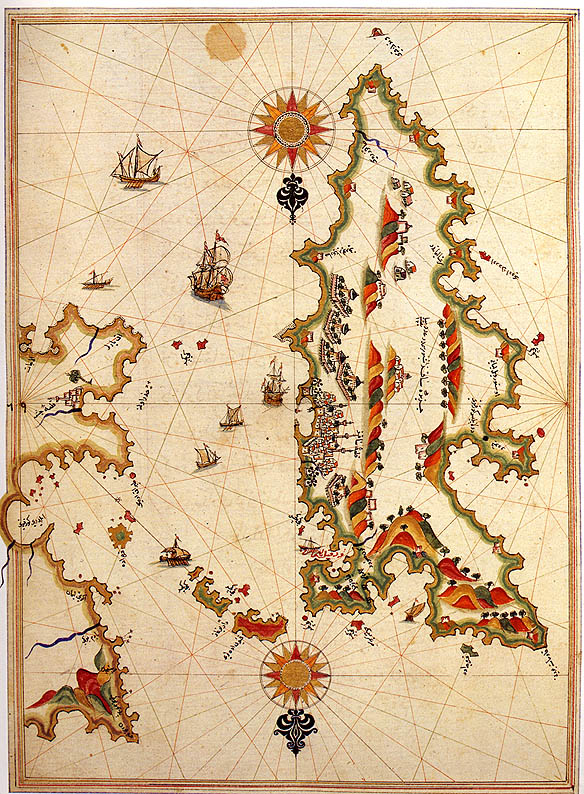
Chios

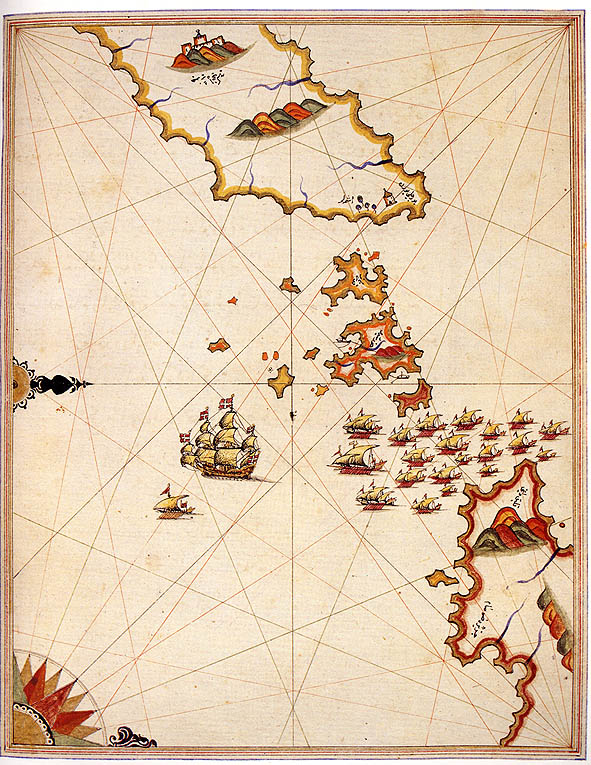
Samos and Icaria

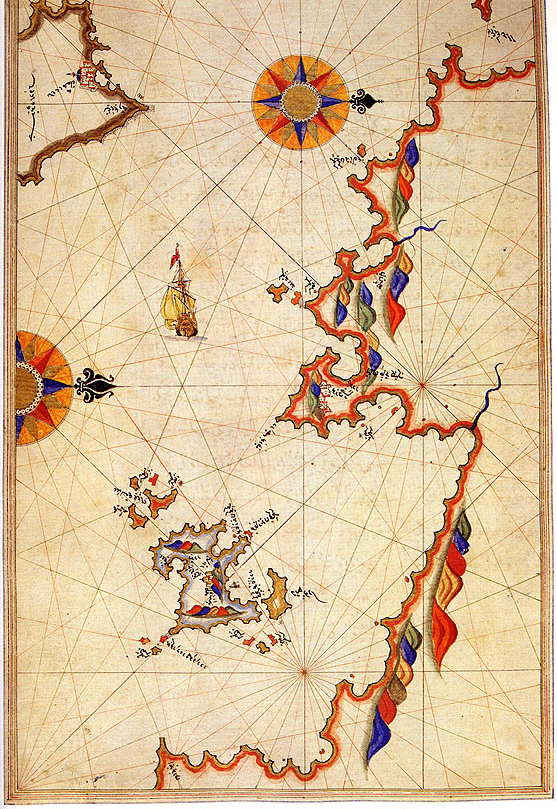
Cape Bozburun near Marmaris and Datça

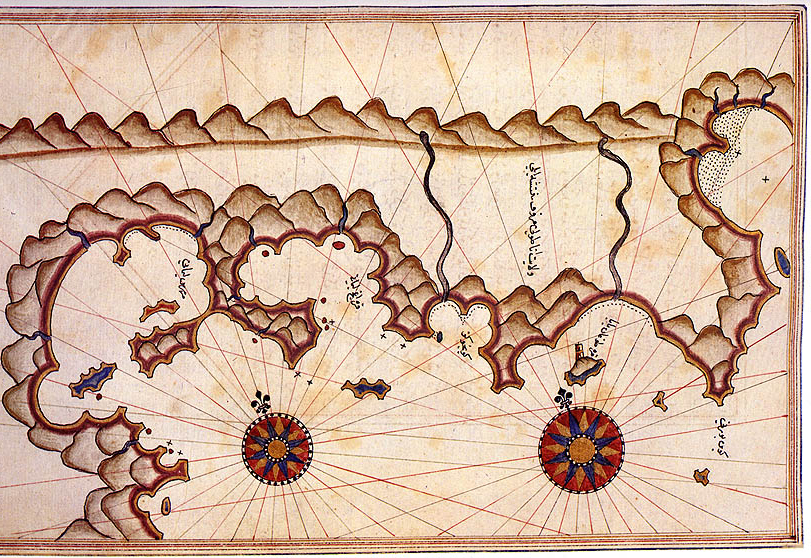
Marmaris

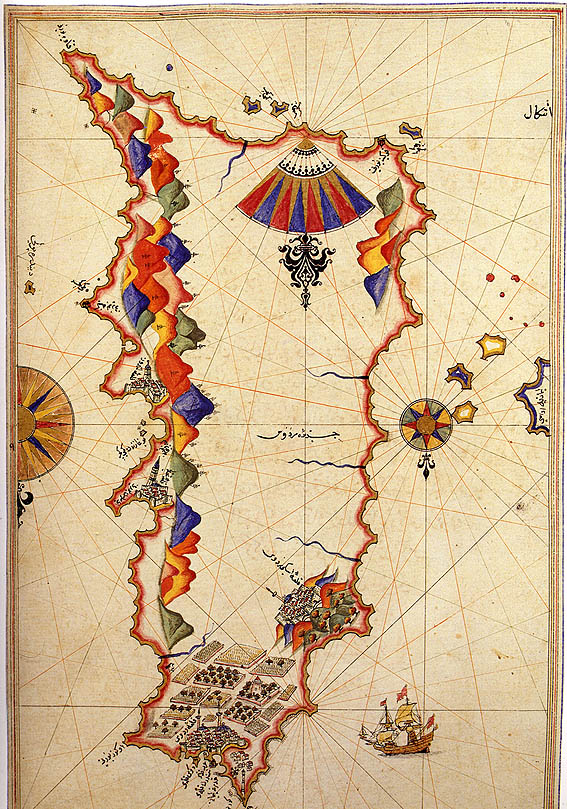
Rhodes

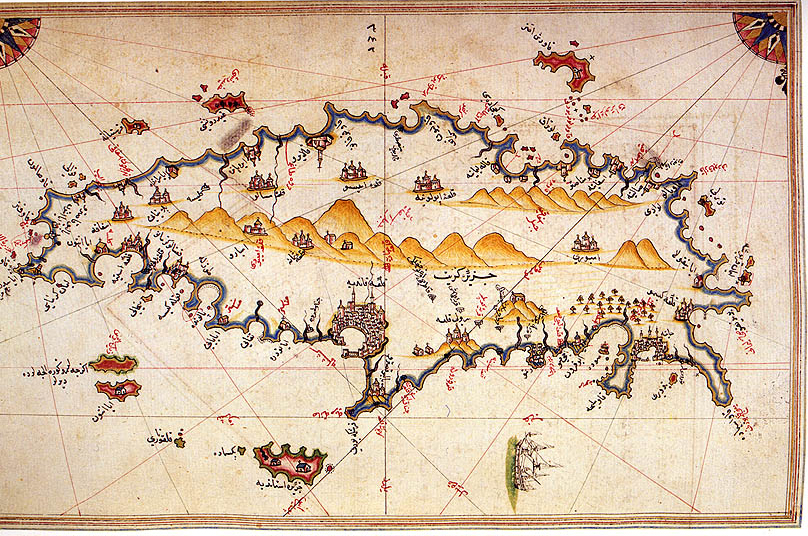
Crete

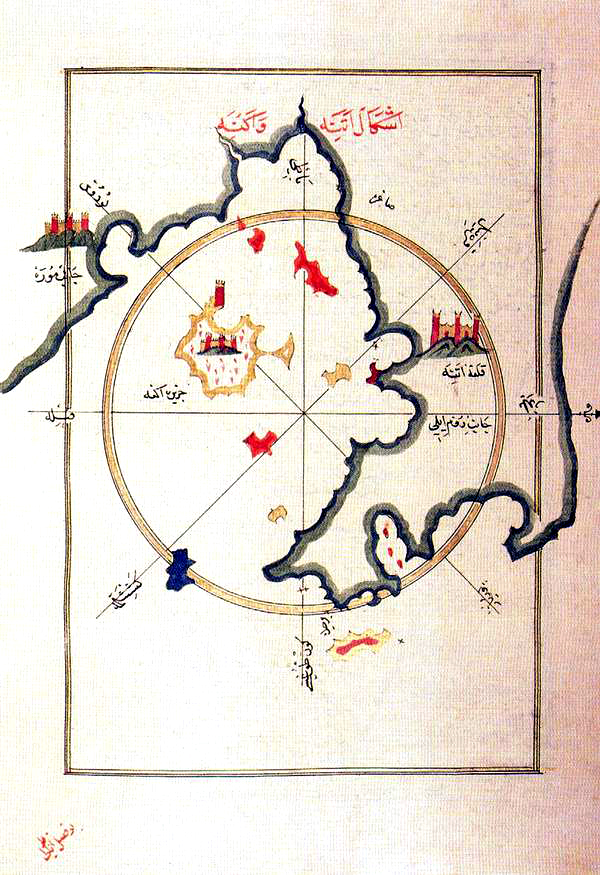
Athens

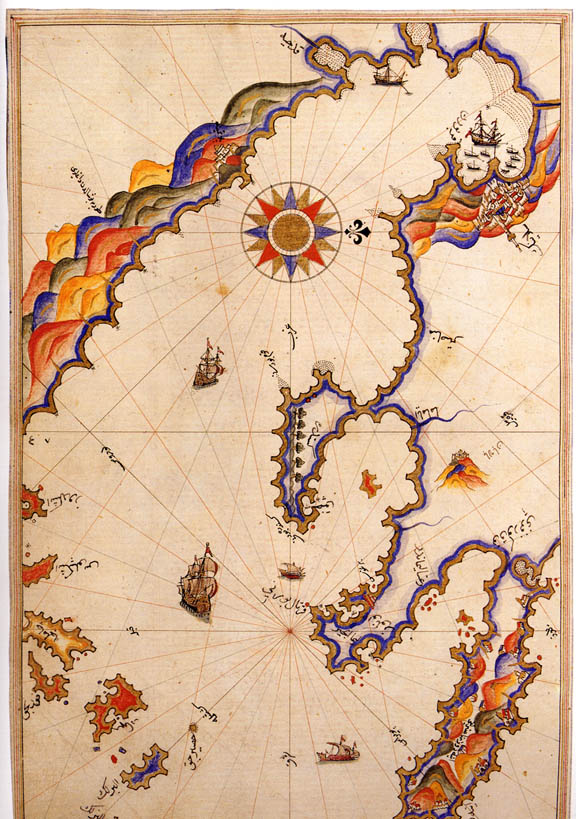
Thessaloniki

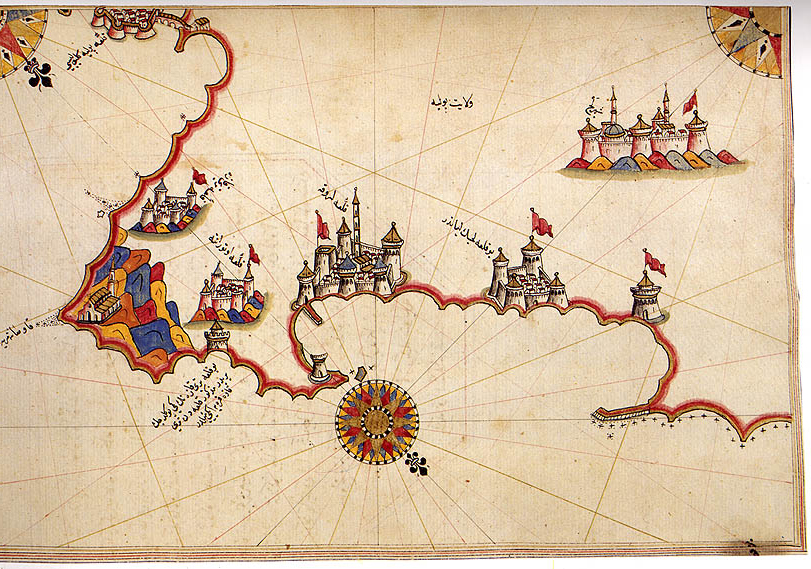
Otranto

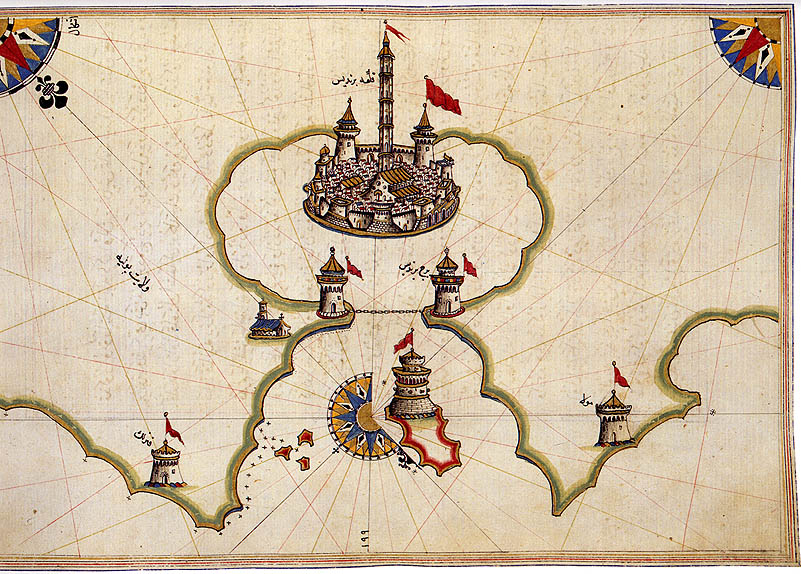
Brindisi

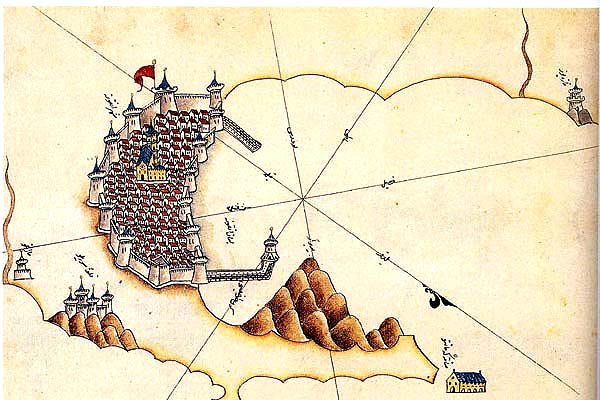
Ancona

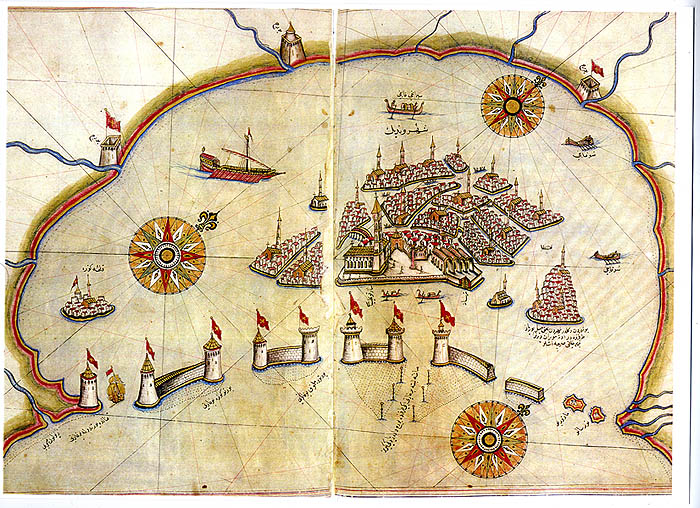
Venice

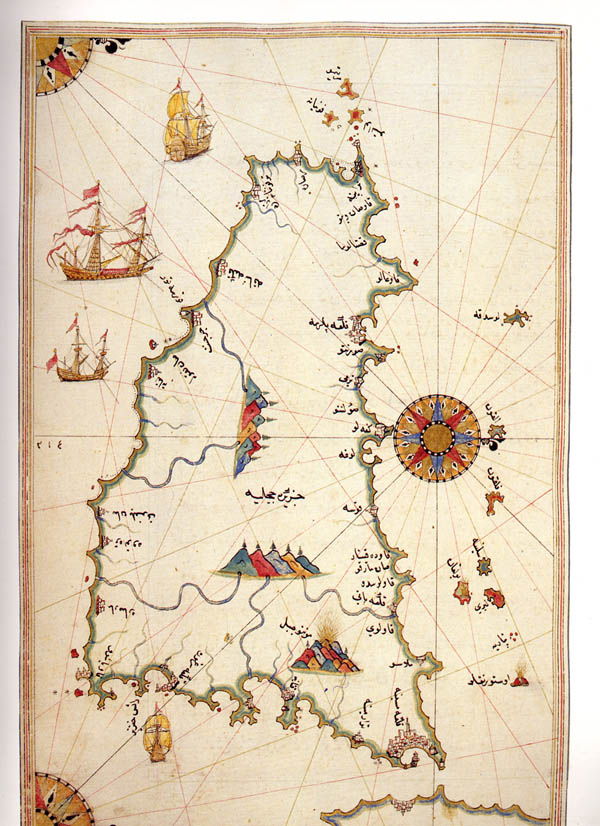
Sicily

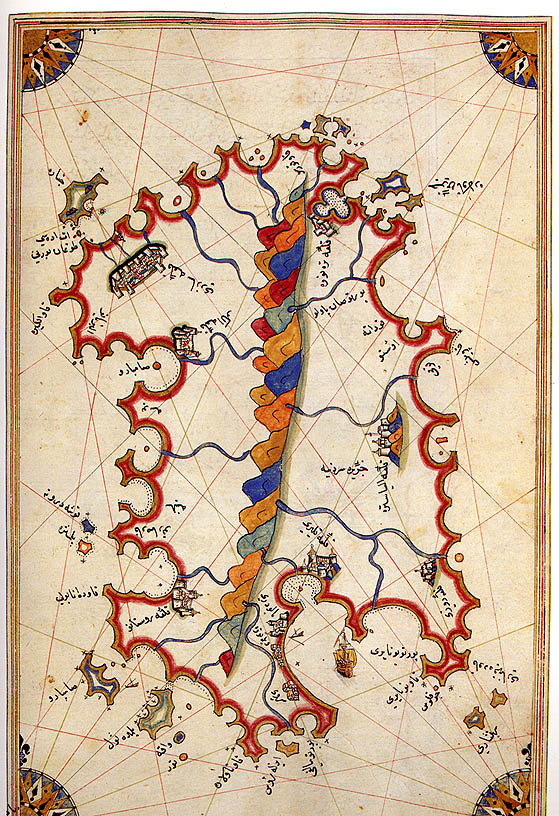
Sardinia

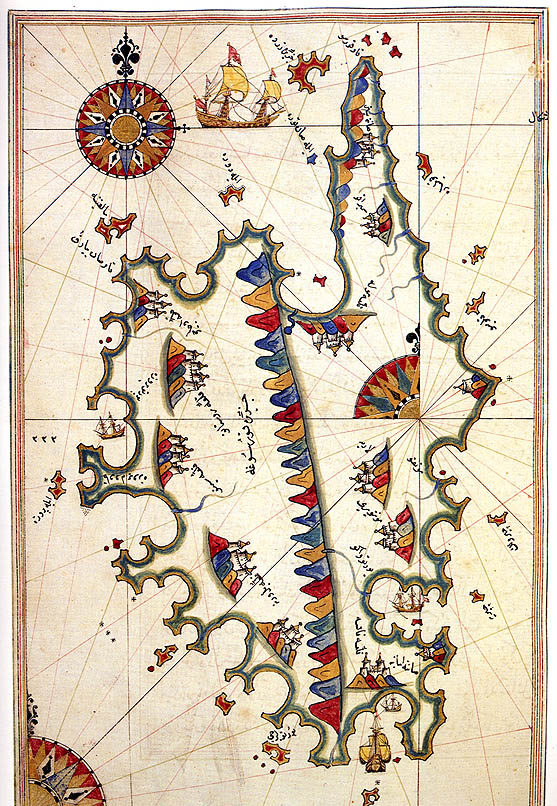
Corsica

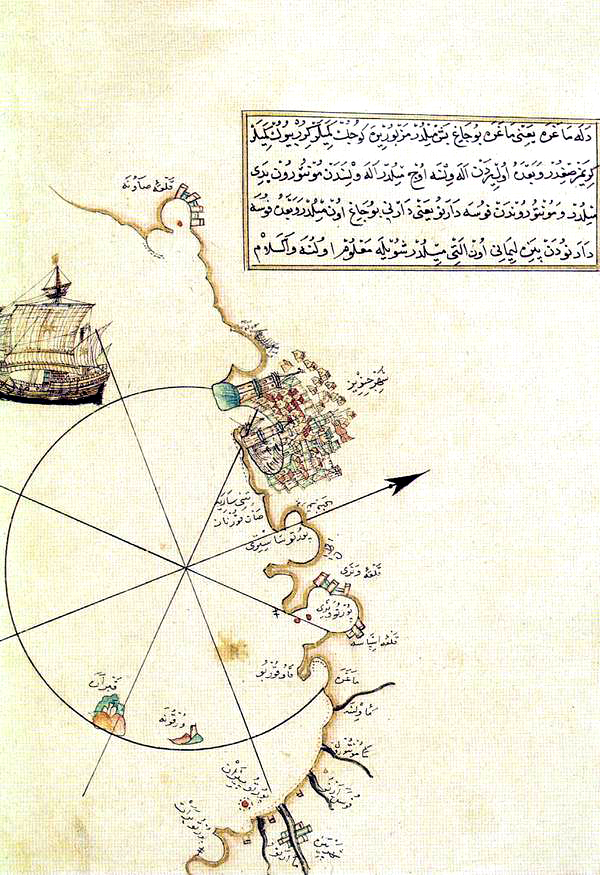
Genoa

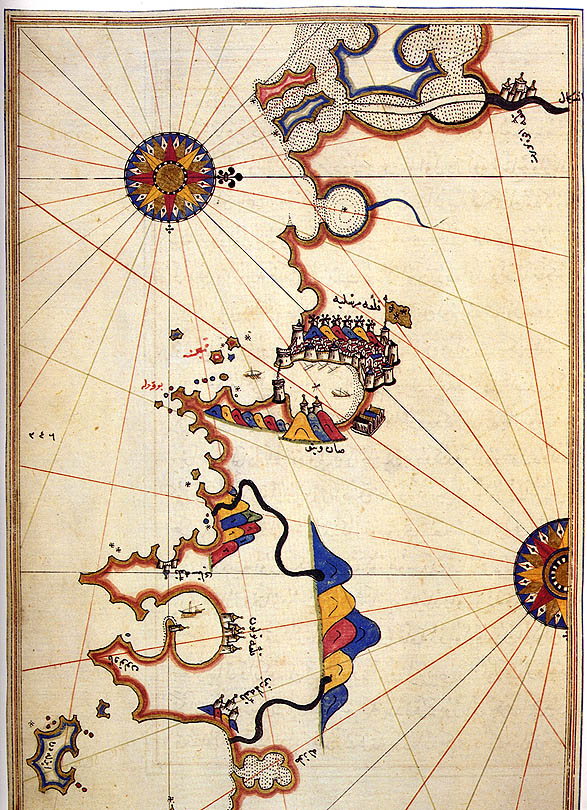
Marseille and Toulon

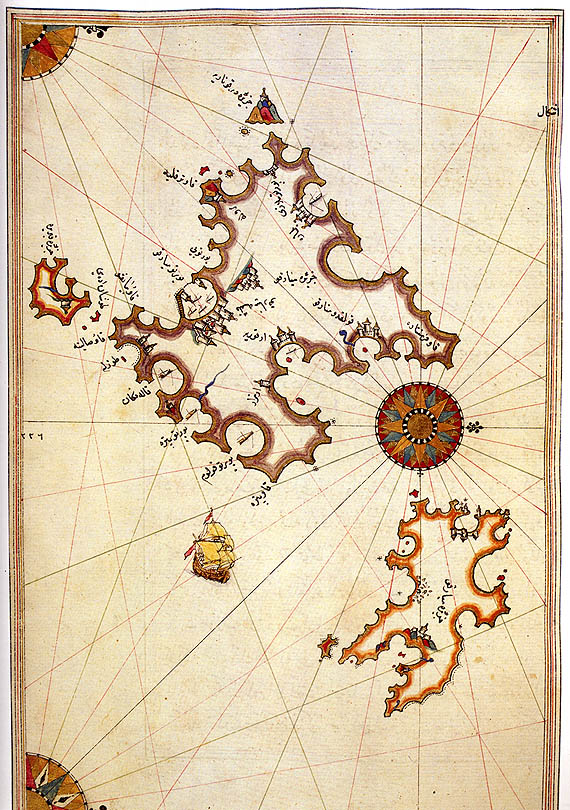
Mallorca and Menorca

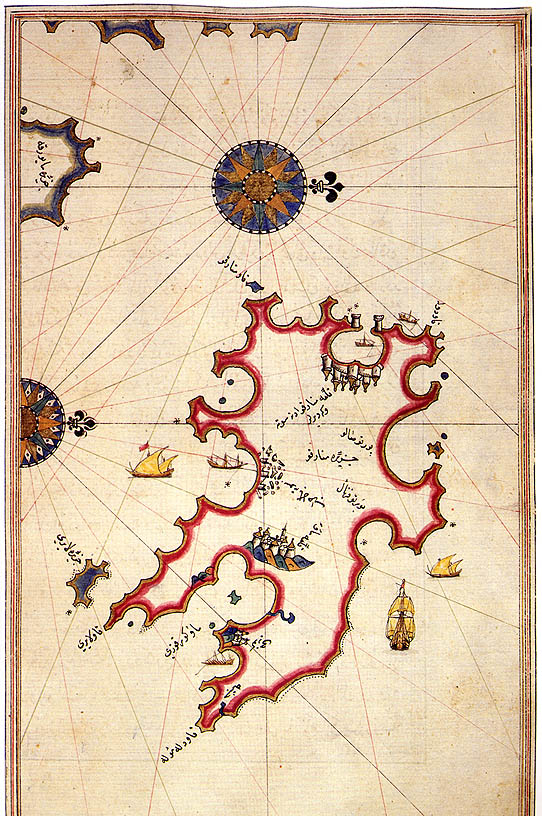
Menorca

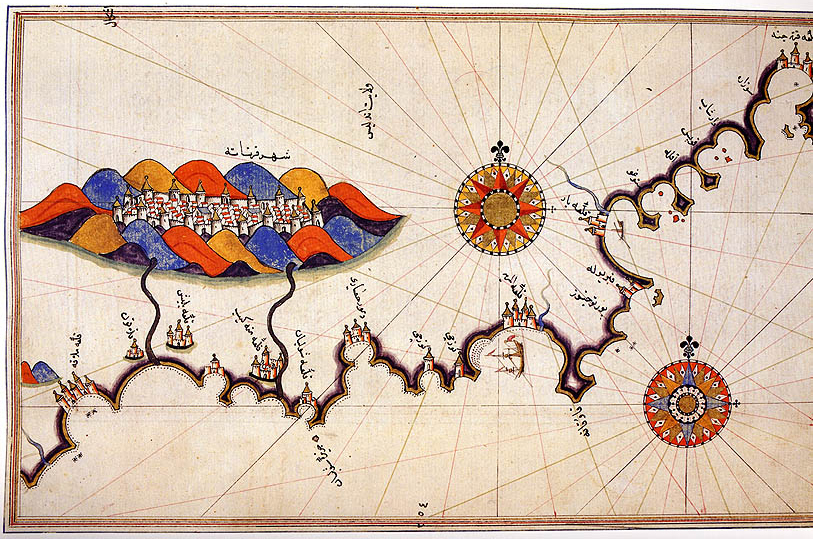
Granada

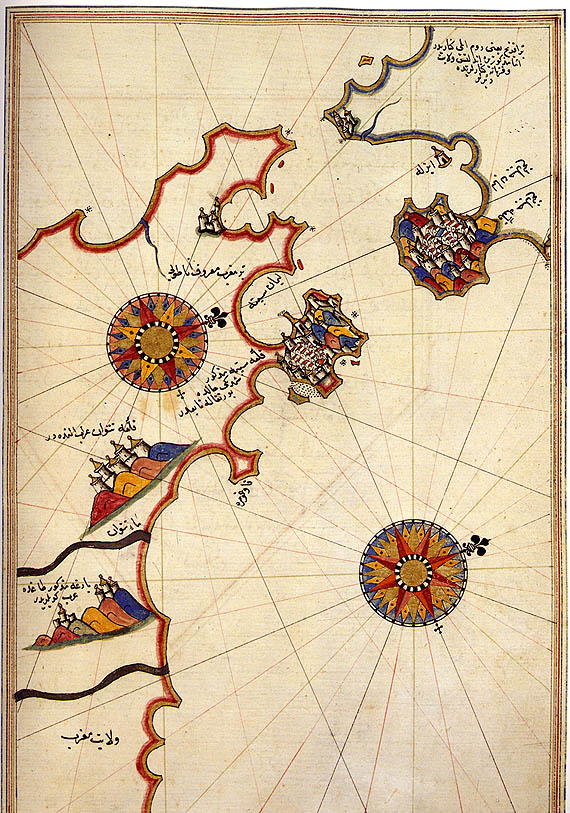
Gibraltar

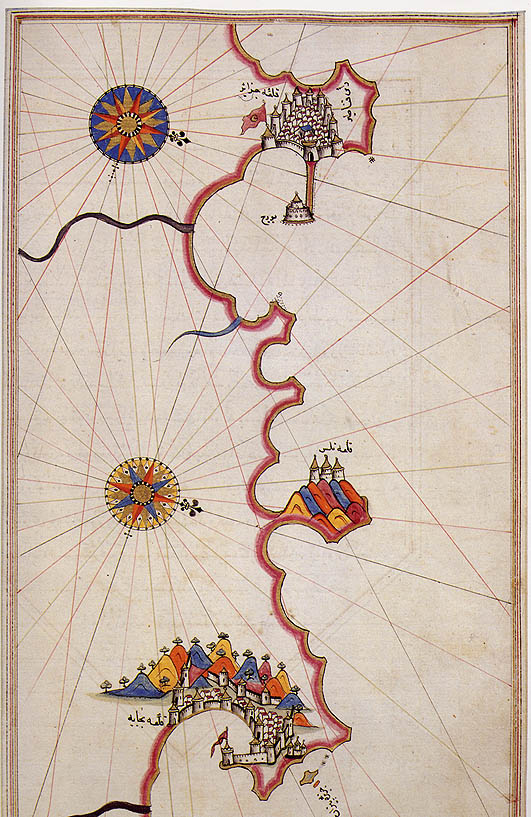
Algiers and Béjaïa

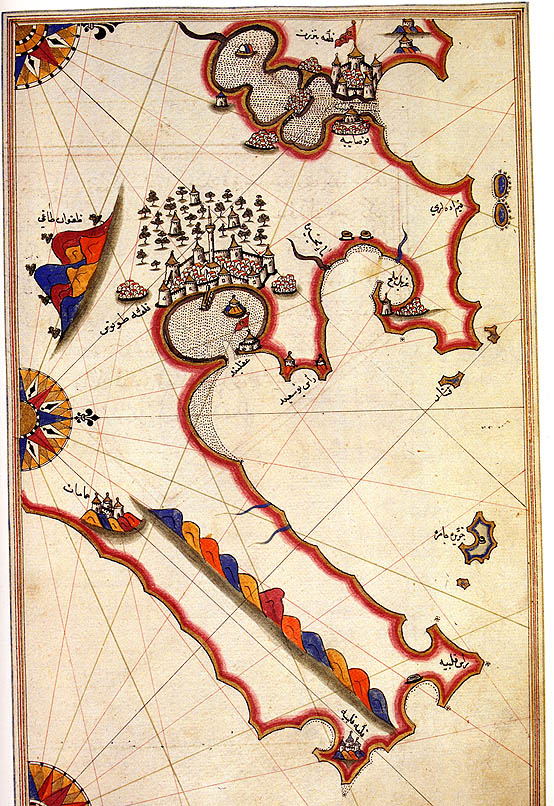
Tunis

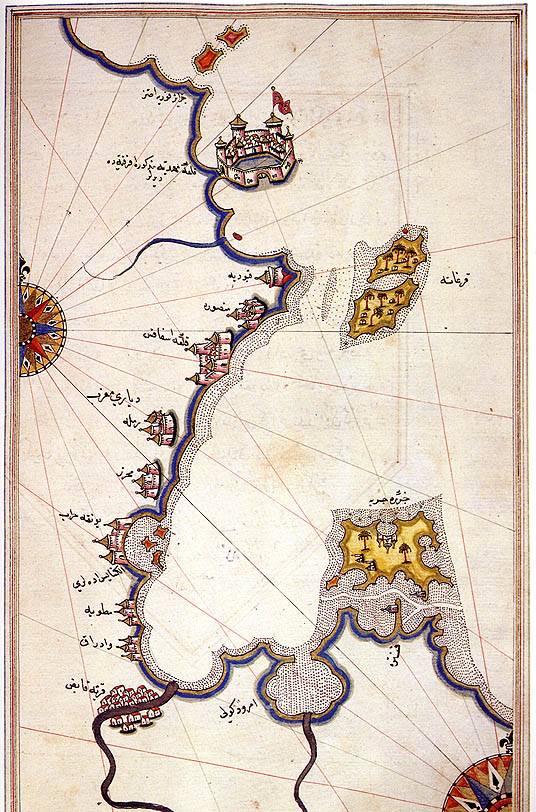
Djerba

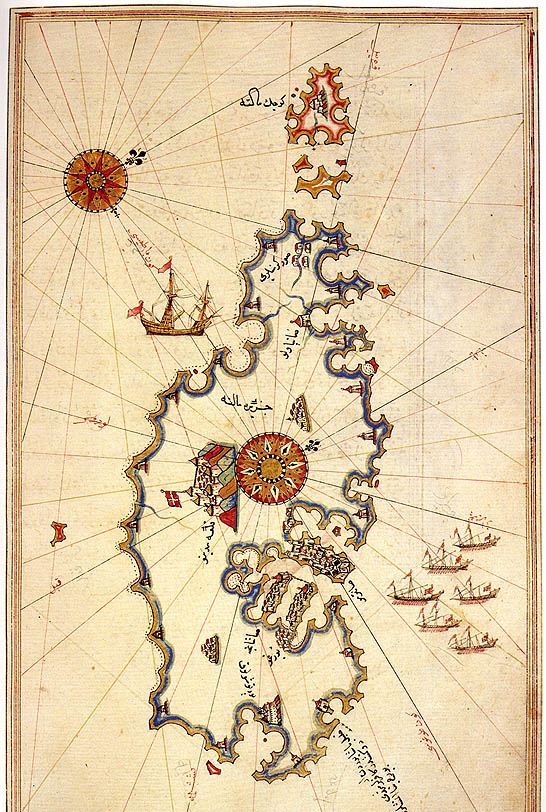
Malta

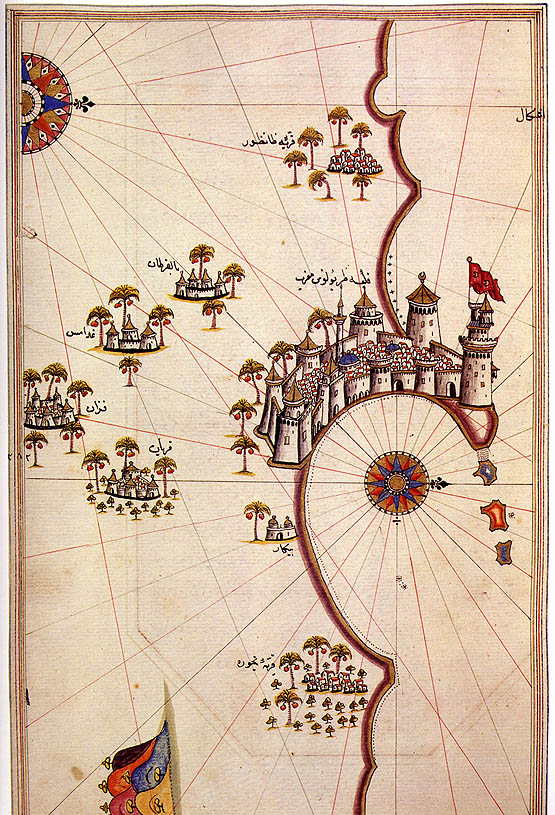
Tripoli, Libya

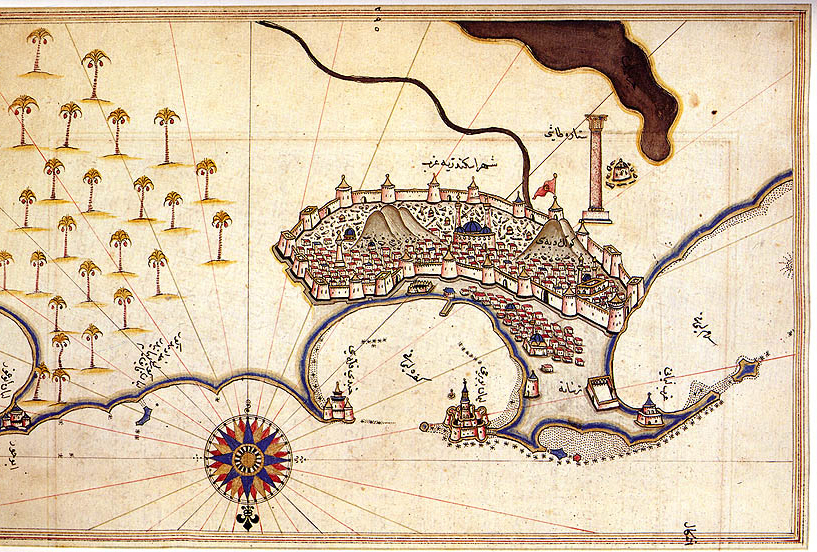
Alexandria

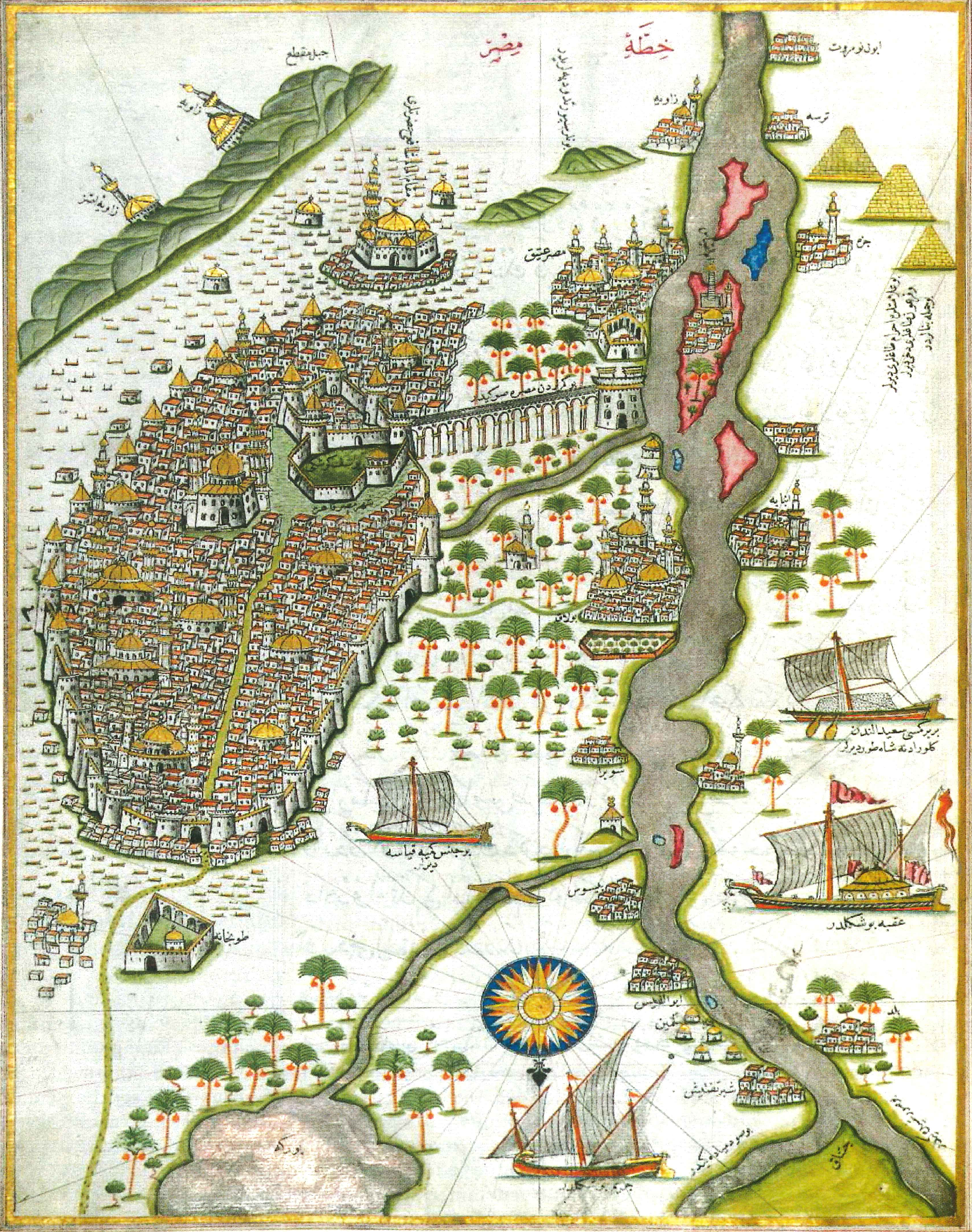
Cairo

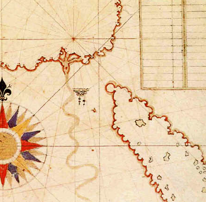
Suez and the Red Sea

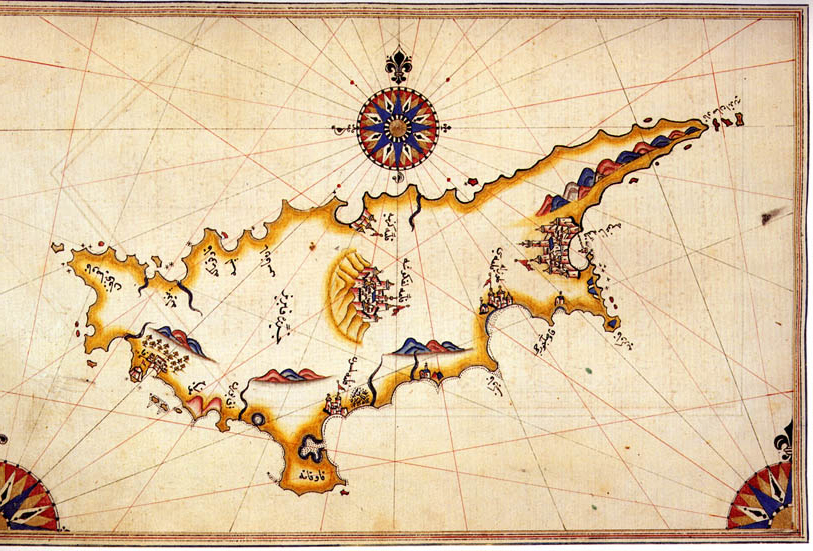
Cyprus

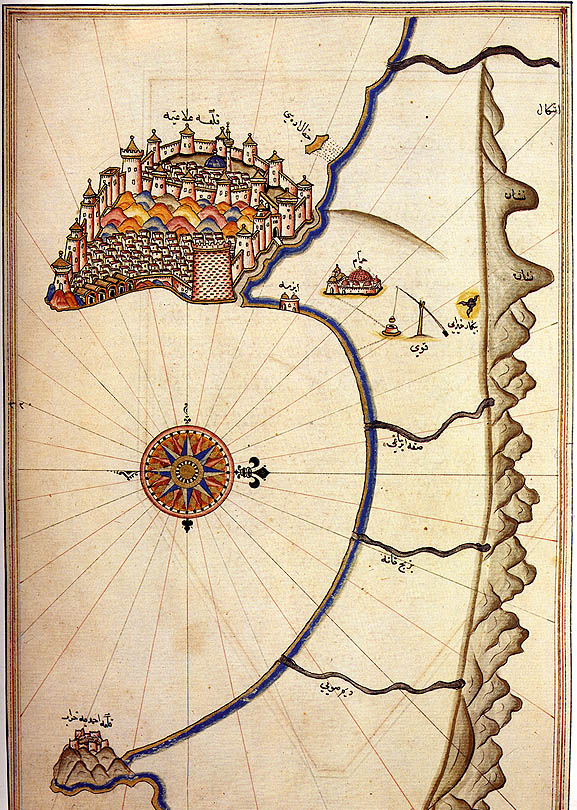
Alanya

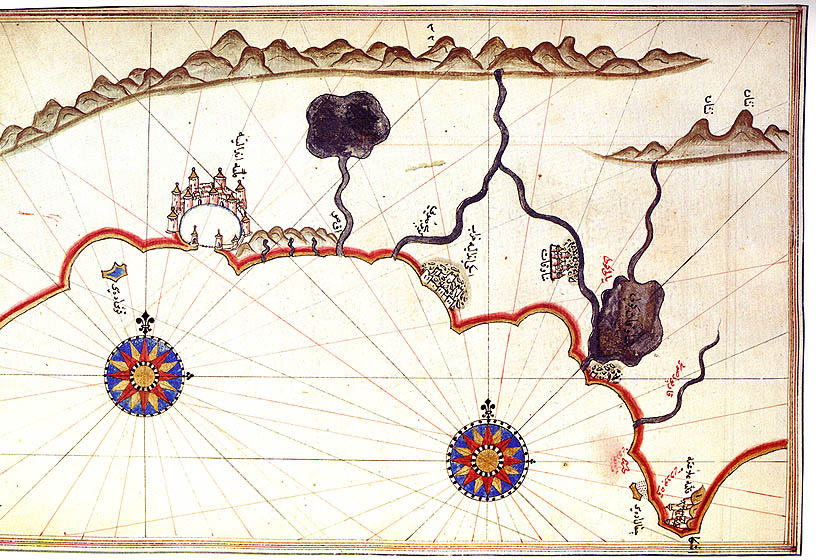
Antalya

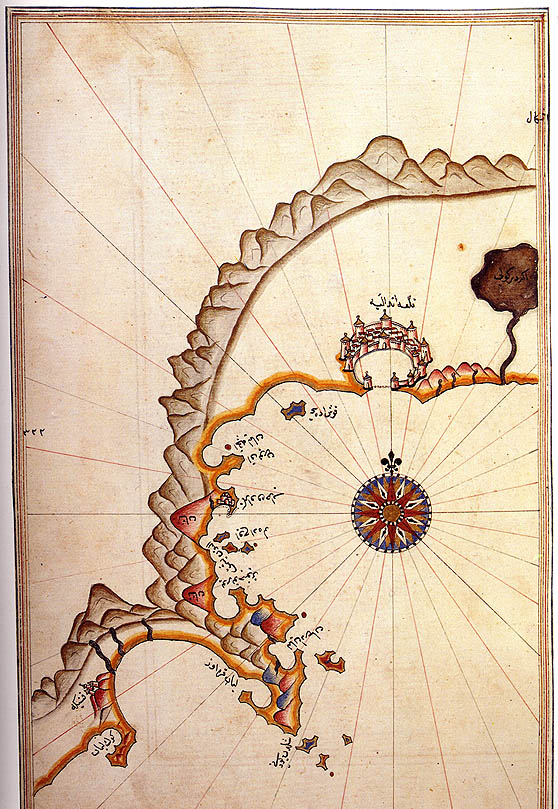
Antalya and Kemer

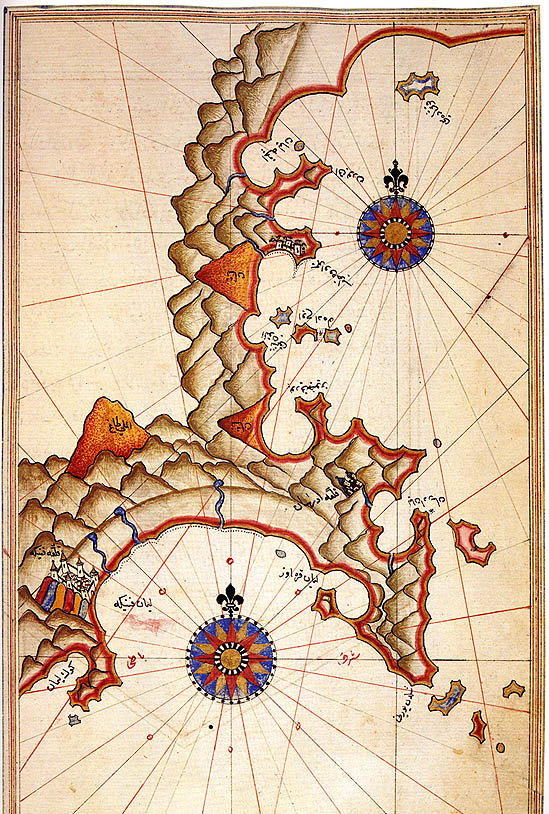
Finike and the Turkish Riviera

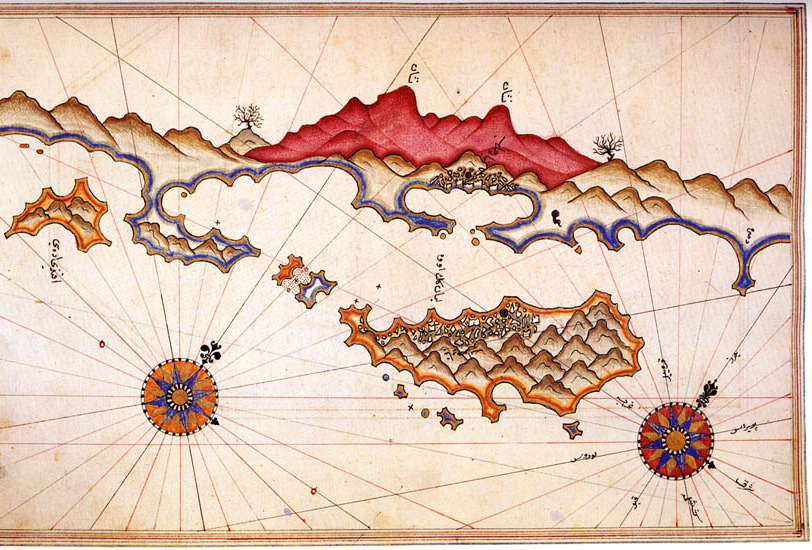
Kekova

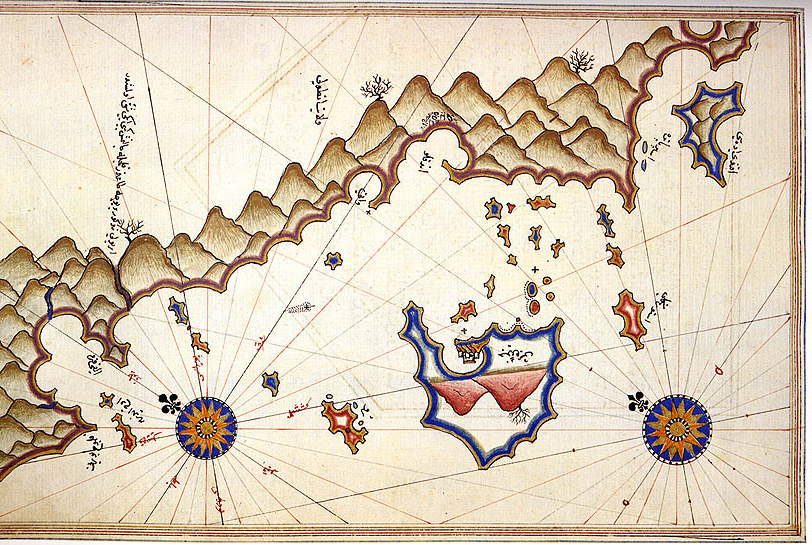
Kaş and Kastellorizo

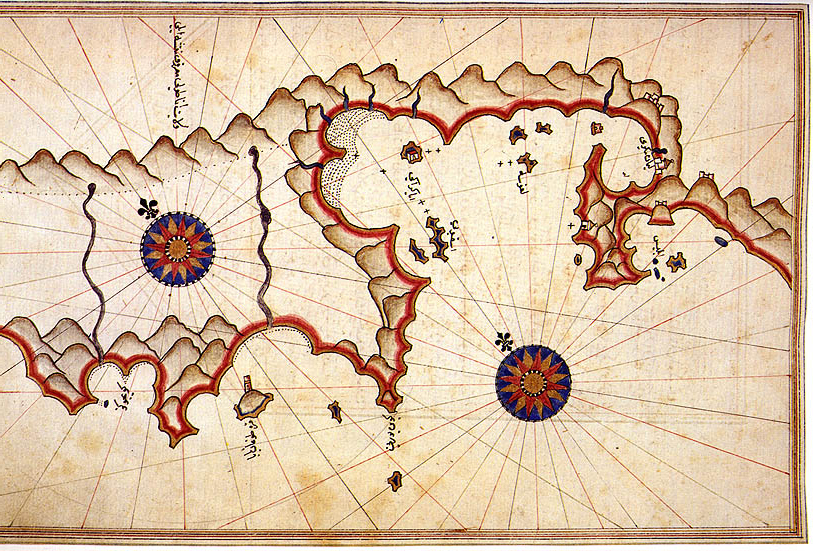
Fethiye

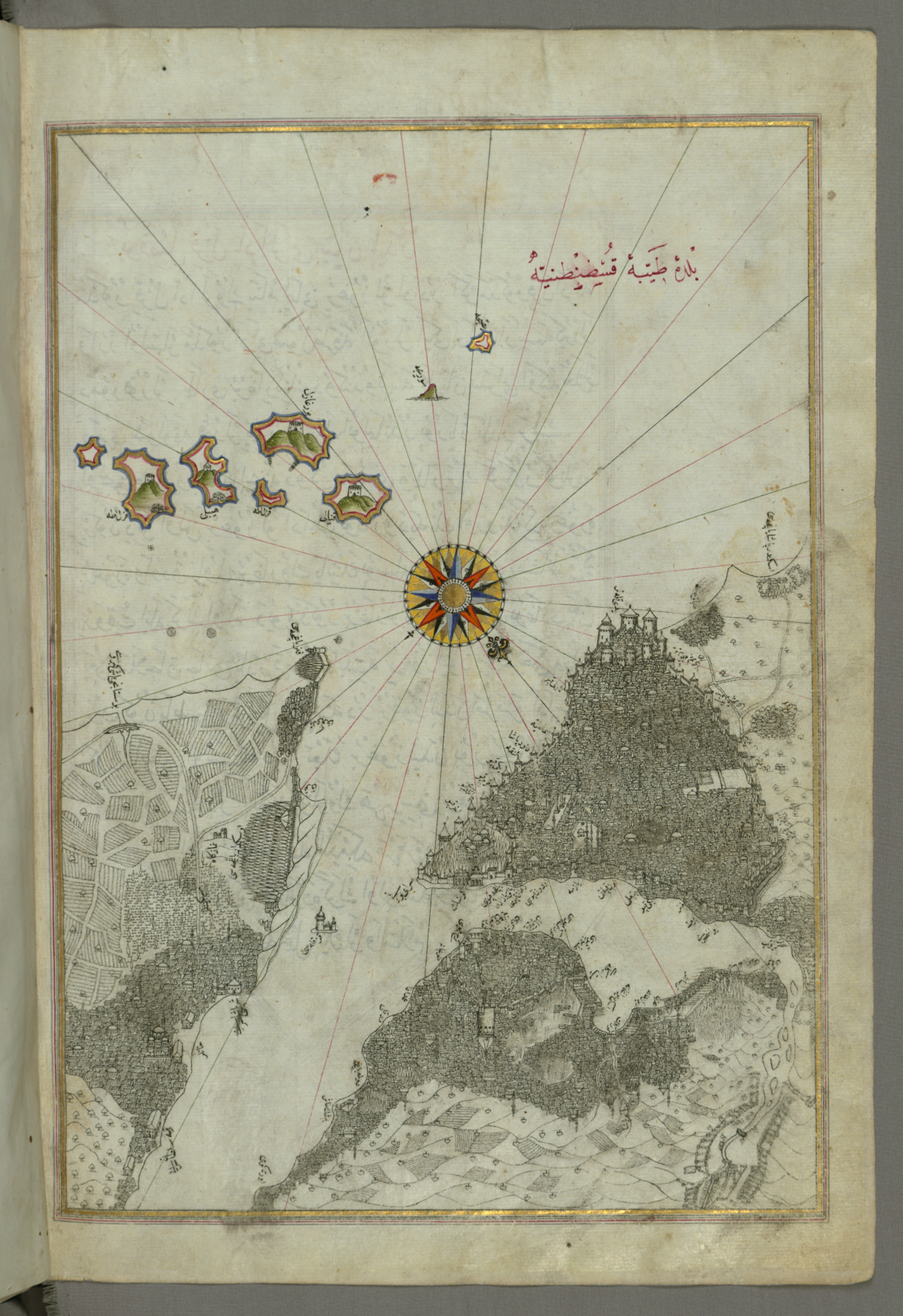
Istanbul
