= Rafe de Crespigny =

Australian sinologist and historian (born 1936)

Richard Rafe Champion de Crespigny
- Born: 1936 (age 89–90); Adelaide, South Australia
- Occupations: Sinologist, historian
- Awards: Centenary Medal (2001)

Academic background
- Education: B.A. Honours History Cambridge (1957); M.A. History Cambridge (1961); B.A. Honours Chinese ANU (1962); M.A. Oriental Studies Honours ANU (1964); PhD Far Eastern History ANU (1968)
- Thesis: The Development of the Chinese Empire in the South (1968)

Academic work
- Discipline: Sinology, Chinese history
- Sub-discipline: History, geography, and literature of the Han dynasty
- Notable works: Northern Frontier: The Policies and Strategy of the Later Han Empire (1984); Imperial Warlord: A Biography of Cao Cao 155-220 AD (2010)

Richard Rafe Champion de Crespigny (born 1936), also known by his Chinese name Zhang Leifu (Chinese: 張磊夫), is an Australian sinologist and historian. He is an honorary professor in the College of Asia and the Pacific at the Australian National University. He specialises in the history, geography and literature of the Han dynasty, particularly the translation and historiography of material concerning the Han dynasty and the Three Kingdoms period.

== Family ==
The son of Richard Geoffrey Champion de Crespigny, OBE (1907–1966), and Kathleen Cavenagh Champion de Crespigny (1908–2013), née Cudmore, Richard Rafe Champion de Crespigny was born in Adelaide in 1936. He married Christa Boltz in Turner, Australian Capital Territory on 19 May 1959.

== Education ==
De Crespigny received his tertiary education at the University of Cambridge (B.A. Honours History 1957; M.A. History 1961) and the Australian National University (B.A. Honours Chinese 1962; M.A. Oriental Studies Honours 1964; PhD Far Eastern History 1968).

During his early years as a scholar and academic, de Crespigny benefited from the guidance of Geoffrey Elton and sinologists such as Hans Bielenstein, Otto van der Sprenkel, Fang Chao-ying, Liu Ts'un-yan and Göran Malmqvist, and he developed an interest in the late Han dynasty through the historical novel Romance of the Three Kingdoms. His doctoral dissertation of 1968 on the development of the Chinese empire in the south and the origins of the Three Kingdoms state of Eastern Wu has provided the basis for much of his later work.

== Publications ==
De Crespigny's publications include China: The Land and its People (Melbourne, 1971); China This Century (Melbourne 1975; 2nd Edition Hong Kong 1992), both discussions of modern China. His most significant works, however, are those concerned with the Later Han dynasty and the Three Kingdoms period. Among these are Northern Frontier: The Policies and Strategy of the Later Han Empire (Canberra, 1984); while Emperor Huan and Emperor Ling and To Establish Peace (Canberra, 1996) provide an annotated translation of the chronicle for the years 157 to 189 (chapters 54 to 59) and 189 to 220 (chapters 59 to 69) from the Zizhi Tongjian of Sima Guang, respectively. He has also published more than twenty articles in Australia and overseas.

Generals of the South, published in 1990, narrates the rise of the Sun clan and the formation of the Three Kingdoms tripartite. It builds on the broad range of his translation experience and is telling about his historical interests. Like Northern Frontier, the work focuses on strategies, campaigns and personalities. The approach owes a great deal to the narrative tradition of the historical novel Romance of the Three Kingdoms but Generals of the South also discusses the population and development of southern China from the second century AD. In dealing with the military defence of the south via the boundary of the Yangtze River, it presents the best discussion of the Battle of Red Cliffs and early Chinese riverine warfare available in English. The work also provides an important prelude to further research into the political and cultural divisions of the Northern and Southern dynasties.

In 2007, A Biographical Dictionary of Later Han to the Three Kingdoms 23–220 AD was published by Brill as a companion to Michael Loewe's biographical dictionary dealing with the Qin, Former Han and Xin periods 221 BC – 24 AD (Brill 2000).

De Crespigny's more recent publications include Imperial Warlord, a biography of Cao Cao (Brill 2010), which was awarded the Stanislas Julien Prize for 2011 by the French Académie des Inscriptions et Belles-Lettres. In 2016 Brill published Fire over Luoyang, a narrative and analytical history of Later Han. He was brought on as a consultant for the Creative Assembly strategy video game Total War: Three Kingdoms (released 2019).

== Associations and appointments ==
De Crespigny is a Fellow of the Australian Academy of the Humanities. He has also been President of the Chinese Studies Association of Australia, a Fellow of the Oriental Society of Australasia, a vice-president of the Australian Institute of International Affairs; and a member of the Asian Studies Association of Australia, the Historical Association (United Kingdom) and the Royal Geographical Society of Australasia.

- 1971: Secretary-General of the 28th International Congress of Orientalists at Canberra
- 1971–72: Visiting Fellow of Clare Hall, University of Cambridge
- 1972 and 1984: Academic Exchange Visitor of the German Academic Exchange Service [DAAD]
- 1978: Visiting Professor, Asian Studies Program, University of Hawaiʻi
- 1978: Guest Professor, College of Chinese Culture
- 1983–97: Honorary Treasurer, Australian Committee for the Cambridge Commonwealth Trust
- 1986: Visiting Fellow, Institute of Sinology, Leiden University
- 1991–2001: Master of University House, Australian National University

== Honours ==
De Crespigny was awarded a Centenary Medal in 2001 for services to Australian society in Asian studies.

== See also ==
- C. T. C. de Crespigny – Rafe de Crespigny's grandfather; includes details of the Australian branch of the Champion de Crespigny family
