= Herbert Loewe =

British scholar (1882–1940)

Herbert Martin James Loewe (1882–1940) was a noted scholar of Semitic languages and Jewish culture. His grandfather, Louis Loewe (1809–1880), had been Sir Moses Montefiore's secretary and the first Principal of the Judith Lady Montefiore College at Ramsgate.

== Biography ==
Loewe was a graduate of Queens' College, Cambridge. He was Chief English Master at the Schools of the Alliance at Cairo and Abyassiyyeh, Egypt, and the author of Kitab el Ansab of Samani. Loewe was a lecturer in Semitic languages at Exeter College, Oxford, from 1913 until 1931 when he accepted an academic position at Cambridge. Just before he left Oxford, he was responsible for the installation of three tablets in honour of Oxford Jewish heritage. The tablets celebrate the Centenary of the birth of Neubauer, who was a noted Jewish librarian in the Bodleian. Loewe was Curator of Oriental Literature, University Library, Cambridge, and Reader in Rabbinics, Cambridge, from 1931 to his death. From 1939 to 1940 Loewe was president of the Society for Old Testament Study.

Loewe's first son, Raphael Loewe (1919–2011) was a scholar of Hebrew and a professor at University College London, while his second son Michael Loewe was a noted scholar of Chinese who taught at Cambridge University.

== Loewe Collection ==
The Oxford Centre for Hebrew and Jewish Studies has in its library a collection of approximately 5,000 items collected by Herbert Loewe and his elder son Raphael Loewe (b. 1919, d. 27 May 2011), professor of Hebrew at University College London. The collection contains correspondence, offprints, unpublished typescripts of translations of Hebrew poetry, and a wide variety of printed matter related to Jewish studies in late antiquity and medieval times, as well as modern Anglo-Jewish history. There are a few items connected with Louis Loewe.
