= Li Man-kuei =

Chinese politician

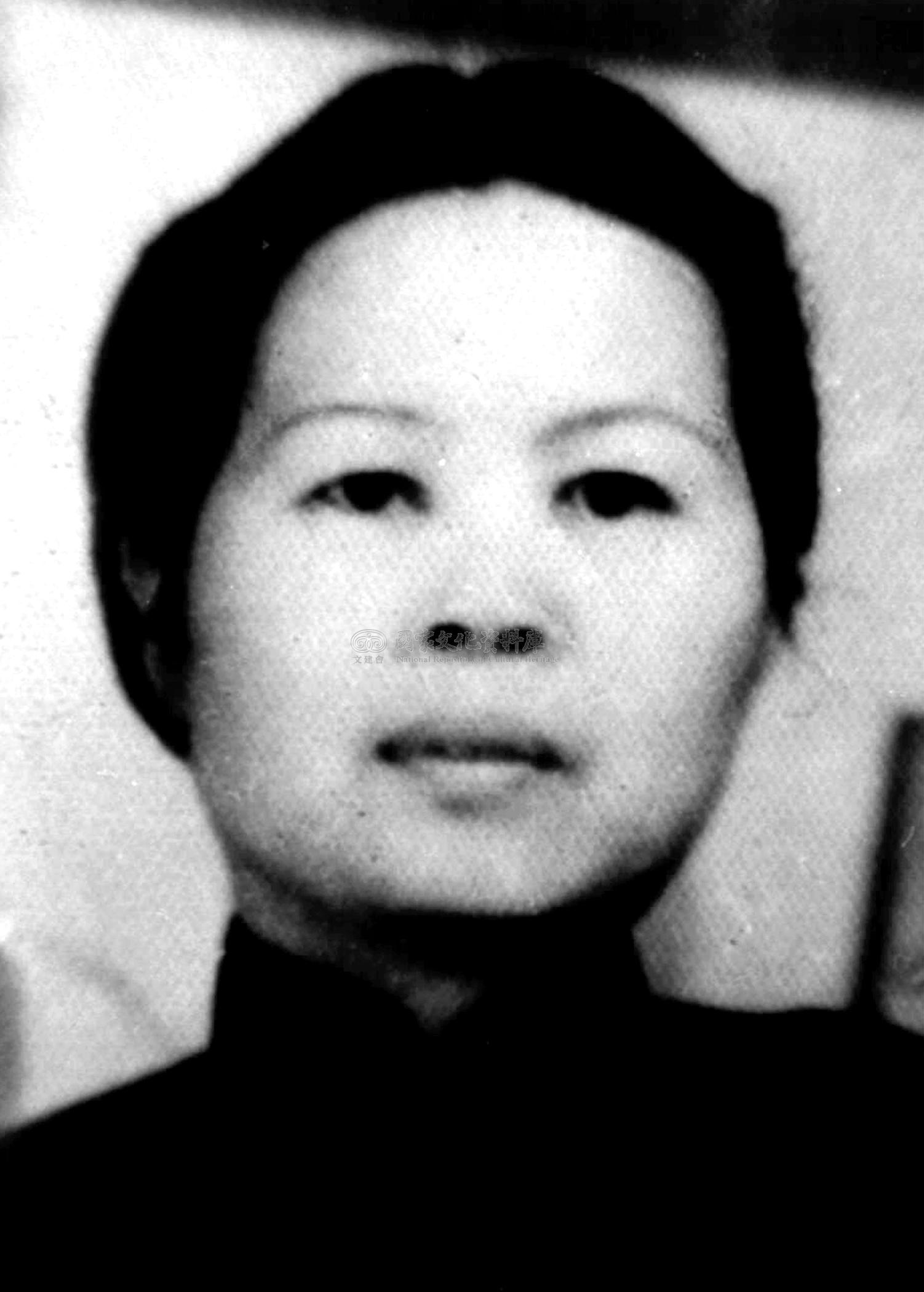
- Li in 1969

Member of the Legislative Yuan
- In office 1948–1975
- Constituency: Guangdong

Personal details
- Born: 13 June 1907
- Died: 20 October 1975 (aged 68)
- Party: Kuomintang

Li Man-kuei (Chinese: 李曼瑰, 13 June 1907 – 20 October 1975) was a Chinese educator, dramatist and politician. She was among the first group of women elected to the Legislative Yuan in 1948 and has been described as the 'mother of modern Chinese drama'.

== Biography ==
Born in 1907, Li was originally from Taishan in Guangdong province. After attending Zhenguang Middle School between 1921 and 1926, she majored in Chinese at Yenching University, graduating in 1930. She returned to Guangdong and taught Chinese at Pooi To Middle School until 1933, when she returned to Yenching University for graduate studies in Chinese and English. Between 1934 and 1936 she attended University of Michigan as a Barbour Scholar and earned a master's degree in English. During her time in Michigan she became the first foreign student to win the Hopwood Contest for Drama and Essay. She was then employed by Library of Congress in Washington, D.C. compiling the Eminent Chinese of the Ch'ing Period. From 1937 to 1940 she worked at Columbia University, where she worked part-time in the East Asiatic Collections, edited Far Eastern Magazine (the publication of the Chinese Students Association of America) and specialised in writing plays and stories.

Returning to China in 1940, Li taught at several institutions, including Ginling College and Chengchi University. A prominent member of the Kuomintang, she was a delegate to the Constituent National Assembly that drew up the constitution of the Republic of China. She was subsequently a candidate in Guangdong Province in the 1948 elections to the Legislative Yuan, in which she was elected to parliament. She relocated to Taiwan during the Chinese Civil War, where she was credited with reviving local theatre. She used her political influence to raise the profile of drama and funding for it, organised drama festivals and encouraged international cultural exchange. After returning from a visit to Europe and the United States in 1960, she established the Little Theatre Movement. The Little Theatre Movement introduced Western styles and modern performing arts to Taiwanese drama. She became dean of the drama departments at Chinese Culture University and Fu Hsing Kang College, and served as a juror of the Asia-Pacific Film Festival. She died in 1975.
