= Tu Lien-che =

Chinese writer (1904–1994)

Tu Lien-che (Chinese: 杜聯喆; pinyin: Dù Liánzhé; 1904–1994), sometimes credited also to incorporate her married name Fang, was a distinguished bibliographer and historian of China.

== Early life and education ==
Born in Tianjin as the daughter of scholar and calligrapher Du Tong, she met Fang Chao-ying while they were both students at Yenching University, where she earned her degree in history. She would become Fang's wife and lifelong collaborator.

== Career ==
Key works on which she worked included Eminent Chinese of the Ch'ing Period and the Dictionary of Ming Biography. Of her single-authored scholarship, her work clarifying the origins of the Grand Council was especially well-regarded. Her younger brother Du Lianqi was well known for his writings on theatre.
