= Dictionary of Ming Biography, 1368–1644 =

Biographical dictionary

- First edition cover of Dictionary of Ming Biography, 1368–1644
- Editors: Luther Carrington Goodrich; Fang Chao-ying
- Subject: Biography; Ming dynasty
- Publisher: Columbia University Press
- Publication date: 1976
- Media type: Print (hardback)
- Pages: 1751
- ISBN: 0-231-03801-1 (volume 1); 0-231-03833-X (volume 2)

The Dictionary of Ming Biography, 1368–1644 (Chinese: 明代名人傳), often abbreviated as DMB or referred to as "Goodrich and Fang", was compiled under the auspices of the Ming Biographical History Project of the Association for Asian Studies, and edited by Luther Carrington Goodrich and Fang Chao-ying. It was published by Columbia University Press in 1976.

== Synopsis ==
The dictionary is in two volumes, comprising approx. 650 biographies written by 125 sinologists. Volume 1 starts with an introduction and explanatory notes, then covers names from A to L (pages 1–1022). Volume 2 covers names from M to Z, followed by indices of names, book titles and subjects (pages 1023–1751). Chinese names are romanised using the Wade–Giles system.

== Development ==
The dictionary was almost 20 years in the making. It was first proposed in an Association for Asian Studies meeting in 1958, and confirmed as a worthwhile endeavour at a subsequent meeting in 1959. The editors started work proper in 1962 in premises at Columbia University. Funding came from various foundations, including the Ford Foundation, also academic institutions and the US government. The dictionary was specifically designed to complement Arthur W. Hummel's Eminent Chinese of the Ch'ing Period (ECCP), to the extent that subjects with an entry in ECCP do not also appear in DMB.

== Reception ==
Most reviewers approved of the lengthier biographies in DMB compared to ECCP, and the generally wider spectrum of people who were selected for inclusion. Bernd Eberstein included a lengthy list of errors in his review, but went on to state that "they [did] not diminish the inestimable value of the DMB". W. Allyn Rickett noted that DMB complemented, in addition to ECCP, other biographical dictionaries, such as the Biographical Dictionary of Republican China, and the Biographic Dictionary of Chinese Communism 1921–1965. He considered that, "In terms of its scope and overall quality this dictionary stands as one of the finest pieces of Sinological research ever published." W. S. Atwell wrote that DMB was "probably the most important Western-language reference work on traditional China since the publication of ... [ECCP] in 1943-4", but regretted that it did not include people already appearing in ECCP, whose biographies therefore did not benefit from the c. 30 years of subsequent research.

In 1979, Daniel Bryant, subsequently Professor of Chinese Studies at the University of Victoria, published "A DMB Chronology", a list of names in DMB in chronological order; such a list is not in DMB, though the corresponding list is included in ECCP.
