= Eminent Chinese of the Ch'ing Period =

1943 2-volume biographical dictionary

- Editor: Arthur W. Hummel, Sr.
- Language: English
- Genre: Biographical dictionary
- Publisher: United States Government Printing Office
- Publication date: 1943
- Publication place: United States

Eminent Chinese of the Ch'ing Period (1644–1912) (ECCP) is a biographical dictionary published in 1943 by the United States Government Printing Office, edited by Arthur W. Hummel, Sr., then head of the Orientalia Division of the Library of Congress. Hummel's chief collaborators were Tu Lien-che and Fang Chao-ying. The work was republished in 2018 by Berkshire under the name Eminent Chinese of the Qing Period: 1644–1911/2.

Pamela Kyle Crossley, professor of Chinese history at Dartmouth College, wrote free software to either search and read the articles online or to download the text for offline use. Since the original work uses the Wade-Giles system, which is now unfamiliar to many readers, the software also supplies pinyin romanization. Crossley is also author of the historiographical preface to the new pinyin edition of the work published in 2018, which changed the book's title from "Ch’ing" to "Qing".

The two volumes in approximately 1100 pages comprise some 800 biographical sketches on leading figures of the Qing dynasty (1644–1912) in China. The articles cover Han Chinese, Manchu, Mongol, and other Inner Asian figures, as well as some Europeans. Each article includes a short list of sources and secondary scholarship. There are three indices—personal name, book names, and subjects.

== History of the project ==
Hummel, who had developed his Chinese language skills while a missionary in China, was Chairman of the Committee for the Promotion of Chinese Studies of the American Council of Learned Societies from 1930 to 1934. He worked with Mortimer Graves, executive director of the council, to plan a biographical dictionary of the Qing, and gained financial support from the Rockefeller Foundation. Plans were put into action when Hummel joined the Library of Congress in 1934. A younger colleague recalled that Hummel's concern with clarity and precision led him to read the entire text of ECCP aloud to search for better language.

The printer for the volume did not know Chinese. Dr. Tu compiled a master file of every Chinese character in the text. These characters were then cast in Hong Kong, one for each time a character appeared. The characters were then placed in individual wooden frames and numbered by Dr. Tu. The printer put them one by one into the typesetter by hand. The ECCP is nonetheless nearly free of errors.

The preface by Hu Shih, a leading scholar who had been China's Ambassador to the United States, praised Hummel and the more than fifty scholars who worked for nine years on the project. Among them were Knight Biggerstaff; Meribeth E. Cameron; Ch'i Ssu-ho; John K. Fairbank; L. Carrington Goodrich; Hu Shih; George Kennedy; Li Man-kuei; Hiromu Momose; Nancy Lee Swann; Teng Ssu-yu, who prepared many of the articles on the Taiping Rebellion; Earl Swisher; C. Martin Wilbur; Hellmut Wilhelm; J.C. Yang.

== Reception and reputation ==
The review in the journal Pacific Affairs said "In genuine scholarship, in the wide range of events covered, in intimate accounts of leading happenings, in the voluminous amounts of Chinese source materials employed, the ambitious scale and the success of these two volumes surpass any other single attempt made by the Western world to understand China in over half a century.
