= Fang Chao-ying =

Chinese historian (1908–1985)

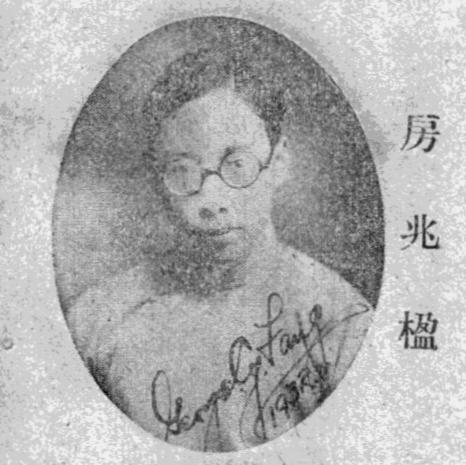
Fang in 1937

Fang Chao-ying (Chinese: 房兆楹; pinyin: Fáng zhàoyíng; 1908–1985) was a Chinese-born American Sinologist, bibliographer, and historian of China best known for the contributions he and his wife, Tu Lien-che, made to the biographical dictionaries Eminent Chinese of the Ch'ing Period (1943) and Dictionary of Ming Biography, 1368–1644 (1976). He spent his professional career primarily at libraries and universities in the United States.

Columbia University in 1985 conferred degrees of Doctor of Humane Letters upon Mr. and Mrs. Fang. He became an American citizen in 1958.

== Education and early career ==
He graduated from Yenching University in 1928, where he studied under William Hung. He studied at Wenhua College of Library Science (Boone Library School), in Wuchang, China in 1932, and became assistant librarian there (1930–32) At Yenching he met Tu Lien-che, who would become his wife and lifelong collaborator. The couple travelled to the United States for him to study at Harvard University. He worked at the Harvard-Yenching Library under Alfred Kai-ming Ch'iu. Arthur W. Hummel, Sr. at the Orientalia Division of the Library of Congress in Washington, D.C. then invited him to be chief assistant on Eminent Chinese of the Ch'ing Period and the Dictionary of Ming Biography

His later career was spent in university institutions: University of California, Berkeley beginning in 1955, at the Australian National University (1961–63) and from 1963 at Columbia University.

In 1980, he delivered the Morrison Lecture on "The Great Wall of China: Keeping Out or Keeping In?"

After retirement, he lived in New Jersey, then died in Beijing on a trip to do research in 1985.

William Theodore de Bary's obituary judged that "It is not too much to say that his name thereby became immortalized in the annals of Western Sinology as the co-compiler of two of the most monumental works of sinological scholarship that have ever been produced in this country."

At Fang's death, the historian Jonathan Spence's notice of appreciation said that as a graduate student he wrote to Fang to ask if he could spend a year in Canberra to study with him. Fang accepted him, and added that he sympathized with Spence's feeling of being "too English to be American and too American to be English." Fang said that he himself felt "proud to be Chinese with an American outlook", and hoped he had "selected in the way of life from both civilizations a little better than just an average."

== Selected publications ==
- Dictionary of Ming Biography
- ---, Julia Ching, translate and ed., Huang, Zongxi, 1610-1695 The records of Ming scholars Internet Archive
