= Michael Loewe =

British sinologist and historian (1922–2025)

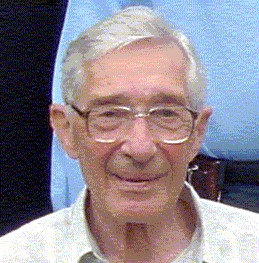
- Loewe in 2005
- Born: Michael Arthur Nathan Loewe; 2 November 1922; Oxford, England
- Died: 1 January 2025 (aged 102)
- Education: SOAS University of London (BA, PhD)
- Spouse: Carmen Blacker (m. 2002; died 2009)
- Relatives: Louis Loewe (great-grandfather); Herbert Loewe (father); Albert Montefiore Hyamson (uncle)
- Scientific career
- Fields: Chinese history
- Institutions: Cambridge University

Chinese name
- Traditional Chinese: 魯惟一
- Simplified Chinese: 鲁惟一
Transcriptions
Standard Mandarin
- Hanyu Pinyin: Lǔ Wéiyī
- Gwoyeu Romatzyh: Luu Weii
- Wade–Giles: Lu^{3} Wei^{2}-i^{1}

Michael Arthur Nathan Loewe (2 November 1922 – 1 January 2025) was a British historian, Sinologist, and writer who authored dozens of books, articles, and other publications in the fields of Classical Chinese as well as the history of ancient and early Imperial China. He was a professor of Chinese and a fellow at the University of Cambridge for nearly 60 years.

== Life and career ==
Loewe was born on 2 November 1922 in Oxford, England, to a distinguished Anglo-Jewish family. His great-grandfather Louis Loewe (1809–1888) was a Prussian Silesian professor of Oriental studies and theology who served as the personal secretary of the British Jewish businessman, financier, and philanthropist Moses Montefiore. Loewe's father, Herbert Loewe, was a professor of Semitic languages who taught at both Cambridge University and Oxford University. Loewe's mother, Ethel Victoria Hyamson, was the sister of the British official and historian Albert Hyamson. His elder brother Raphael Loewe (1919–2011) was a professor of Hebrew and Jewish studies at University College London. Loewe was married to Carmen Blacker, a scholar of the Japanese language.

Loewe attended secondary school at The Perse School in Cambridge, then entered Magdalen College, Oxford. Following the outbreak of war with Japan in December 1941, Loewe was assigned to learn Japanese at the secret Bedford Japanese School run by Captain Oswald Tuck RN. He was on the first course, which began in February 1942 and lasted for five months. Towards the end of the course some training in cryptography was given. After completing the course Loewe was posted to Bletchley Park, where he worked in the Naval Section until the end of the war. He studied Mandarin Chinese in his spare time.

During a six-month stay in Beijing in 1947, Loewe became interested in traditional and historical Chinese topics, which he began studying at the School of African and Oriental Studies, University of London after returning to Britain. He received a first class honours degree in Chinese in 1951, and in 1956 he left the government to serve as a lecturer in the History of the Far East at the University of London. From 1960, he stayed in the Kyoto University Research Centre for the Cultural Sciences for his research. His mentor in Kyoto was Shikazo Mori. On his way from the UK to Kyoto, he purchased the Documents of the Han dynasty on wooden slips from Edsin Gol at Taipei, and started research about it. Shikazo Mori and he organized a reading circle of the wooden slips from Edsin Gol, and his study became his book Records of Han Administration later. SOAS awarded him a Ph.D. in 1963, and he subsequently joined the faculty at Cambridge, where he taught until retiring in 1990 to focus solely on research and scholarship. He was a fellow of Clare Hall, Cambridge.

Loewe turned 100 on 2 November 2022, and died on 1 January 2025, aged 102.

== Honours ==
- Royal Asiatic Society, member.
- American Academy of Arts and Sciences, honorary member.
- 2021 Distinguished Contributions to China Studies Award, presented by the World Forum on China Studies

A unique award in Loewe's honour exists at Cambridge: the "Michael Loewe Prize" may be awarded annually to one or more undergraduate candidates who have achieved distinction in literary Chinese.

== Selected works ==
=== Books ===
- Loewe, Michael (1966). Imperial China: The Historical Background to the Modern Age. London: George Allen and Unwin.
- — (1967). Records of Han Administration (2 vols.). Cambridge: Cambridge University Press.
- — (1968). Everyday Life in Early Imperial China During the Han Period. London: B.T. Batsford. Reprinted (1988), New York: Dorset Press.
- — (1974). Crisis and Conflict in Han China. London: George Allen and Unwin.
- — (1979). Ways to Paradise: The Chinese Quest for Immortality. London: George Allen and Unwin.
- — (1982). Chinese Ideas of Life and Death: Faith, Myth and Reason in the Han Period. London: George Allen and Unwin.
- Loewe, Michael; Twitchett, Denis, eds. (1986). The Cambridge History of China, vol. 1. Cambridge: Cambridge University Press.
- — (1990). The Pride that was China. London: Sidgwick and Jackson.
- Loewe, Michael, ed. (1993). Early Chinese Texts: A Bibliographical Guide. Berkeley: Society for the Study of Early China; Institute of East Asian Studies, University of California Berkeley.
- — (1994). Divination, Mythology and Monarchy in Han China. Cambridge: Cambridge University Press.
- —; Shaughnessy, Edward, eds. (1999). The Cambridge History of Ancient China. Cambridge: Cambridge University Press.
- — (2000). A Biographical Dictionary of the Qin, Han and Xin Dynasties. Leiden: Brill.
- — (2004). The Men who Governed China in Han Times. Leiden: Brill.
- — (2011). Dong Zhongshu, a "Confucian" heritage and the Chunqiu fanlu. Leiden: Brill.

=== Articles ===
- Loewe, Michael (1959). "Some Han-time Documents from Chü-yen". T'oung Pao. 47: 294–322. doi:10.1163/156853259X00123. JSTOR 4528102.
- — (1971). "Spices and Silk: Aspects of World Trade in the First Seven Centuries of the Christian Era". Journal of the Royal Asiatic Society. 103 (2): 166–79. doi:10.1017/S0035869X0012920X.
- — (1977). "Manuscripts Found Recently in China: A Preliminary Survey". T'oung Pao. 63 (2/3): 99–136. doi:10.1163/156853277X00042. JSTOR 4528102.
- — (1988). "The Oracles of the Clouds and the Winds". Bulletin of the School of Oriental and African Studies. 51 (3): 500–20. doi:10.1017/S0041977X00116490.
- — (1994). "China's Sense of Unity as Seen in the Early Empires". T'oung Pao. 80 (1/3): 6–26. doi:10.1163/156853294X00034. JSTOR 4528619.
