= Thomas Day Goodrich =

American historian (1927–2015)

Thomas Goodrich
- Born: 1927; New York City
- Died: November 5, 2015 (aged 87–88)
- Spouse(s): Carol Wright, Sarah Fisher
- Children: 2
- Parent: Luther Carrington Goodrich (father)

Academic background
- Education: Columbia University (MA, PhD)

Academic work
- Discipline: Historian
- Sub-discipline: Ottoman maps and explorations

Thomas Day Goodrich (1927 – November 5, 2015) was an American historian of the Ottoman Empire.

== Early life ==
Tom Goodrich was the son of the prominent sinologist Luther Carrington Goodrich who took him to live in China from the ages of 3 to 5. The family then moved back to the United States, where Goodrich attended school and did his military service.

In 1953, he received his master's degree from Columbia University. He wanted to teach overseas, so he accepted a position in Turkey at a middle school for boys, where he taught for four years. He then spent an additional year in Turkey teaching at a high school for girls in İzmir. It was during this time abroad that he met his first wife Carol "Rusty" Wright.

== Scholarly career ==
Back in the US, Goodrich began a doctoral program in history at Columbia University, where he studied with Tibor Halasi-Kun (his thesis advisor) and Peter Gay.

With the help of a Fulbright Scholarship, Goodrich completed his dissertation, an in-depth study and translation of the Tarih-i Hindi-i Garbi. This is an illustrated history of the exploration and conquest of America written by an Ottoman author in the late 16th century. Upon completing his graduate studies, he and Carol Wright were married and he accepted a teaching position at Indiana University of Pennsylvania. An expanded version of his dissertation was published as a book "The Ottoman Turks and the New World" in 1990.

Goodrich went on to bring to light several little-known Ottoman maps and to become an expert on Piri Reis. In the early 1990s, he was invited by the Topkapı Palace Museum Library to prepare a catalogue for their map collection, which he published in Imago Mundi.

Since 1967, Goodrich taught history at Indiana University of Pennsylvania. In 1973, he was elected chair of the university senate. He retired in 1994 with emeritus status.

The Journal of Ottoman Studies dedicated two issues to Tom Goodrich in a "festschrift" in 2012.
