= Luther Carrington Goodrich =

American sinologist (1894–1986)

L. Carrington Goodrich
- Born: September 21, 1894; Tongzhou District, Beijing, Qing Empire
- Died: August 10, 1986 (aged 91); New York City, New York
- Education: Williams College (B.A.); Columbia University (M.A., Ph.D.)
- Spouse: Anne Perkins Swann
- Children: 5, including Thomas Day Goodrich
- Scientific career
- Workplaces: Columbia University

Chinese name
- Chinese: 富路德
Transcriptions
Standard Mandarin
- Hanyu Pinyin: Fù Lùdé

Luther Carrington Goodrich (September 21, 1894 – August 10, 1986) was an American sinologist and historian of China. A prolific author, he is perhaps best remembered for his work on the Dictionary of Ming Biography, 1368–1644.

== Life ==
Luther Carrington Goodrich was born on September 21, 1894, in Tongzhou, a southeastern suburb of Beijing, where his parents were serving as Protestant missionaries. His father, Chauncey Goodrich (b.1836), had published A Pocket Dictionary (Chinese-English) and Pekingese Syllabary in 1891 and among the nephews of Chauncey's great-grandfather Josiah (born 1731) were a US Senator and US Representative.

As a young child, he lived through the Siege of the International Legations in Beijing; he was able to remember some of these events even in his old age, when he must have been one of the last survivors. He attended the Chefoo School in Yantai (Shandong), the Oberlin Academy in Ohio, and Williams College, from which he graduated in 1917. In 1918, soon after the United States entered World War I, Goodrich joined the US Army and was sent to France, where he worked with the Chinese Labour Corps in France, workers who were brought to France during the war, and were now participating in the post-war rebuilding of the country.

In 1920, Goodrich started graduate work at Columbia University, but soon left for China, where he worked for the China Medical Board of the Rockefeller Foundation. Back at Columbia in 1925, he received his master's degree in 1927 and Ph.D. in 1934. Continued at Columbia as a faculty member, attaining the rank of full Professor in 1945. Excluding a few short breaks spent as a visiting professor in institutions abroad (as far as Santiniketan in India, Japan, and Australia), he spent the rest of his career at Columbia University; even after his retirement from teaching, he still remained associated with Columbia as Dean Lung Professor Emeritus of Chinese.

During his academic career, Goodrich published a number of works on Chinese history. In 1956–1957, he was the president of the Association for Asian Studies.

== Major works ==
- with Henry C. Fenn. A Syllabus of the History of Chinese Civilization and Culture. (NY: The China Society of America, 1929).
- "Chinese Studies in the United States," Chinese Social and Political Science Review 15 (April 1931): 62–77.
- The Literary Inquisition of Ch'ien-Lung. (Baltimore: Waverly Press, American Council of Learned Societies Studies in Chinese and Related Civilizations, 1935).
- with Henry C. Fenn. A Syllabus of the History of Chinese Civilization and Culture. (New York: The China Society of America, 3d, 1941).
- A Short History of the Chinese People. (New York,: Harper, Rev., 1951).
- Ryusaku Tsunoda and -- , Japan in the Chinese Dynastic Histories: Later Han through Ming Dynasties. (South Pasadena Calif.: P.D. and I. Perkins, Perkins Asiatic Monographs, 1951).
- "Archaeology in China: The First Decades," The Journal of Asian Studies 17.1 (1957): 5–15.
- with Henry C. Fenn. A Syllabus of the History of Chinese Civilization and Culture. (New York: China Society of America, 6th, 1958).
- A Short History of the Chinese People. (New York,: Harper & Row, Harper Torchbooks University Library 3d, 1963).
- The Literary Inquisition of Ch'ien-Lung. (New York,: Paragon Book Reprint Corp., American Council of Learned Societies Studies in Chinese and Related Civilizations, 2d, 1966).
- with W. A. C. Adie. A Short History of the Chinese People. (London,: Allen & Unwin, 3rd, 1969). ISBN 978-0-04-951015-9.
- Hans Widmann and --. Der Gegenwärtige Stand Der Gutenberg-Forschung. Hrsg. Von Hans Widmann. Mit Beiträgen Von L. Carrington Goodrich [Et Al.]. (Stuttgart,: A. Hiersemann, Bibliothek Des Buchwesens, 1972). ISBN 978-3-7772-7225-2.
- "Arthur William Hummel, March 6, 1884-March 10, 1975," Journal of the American Oriental Society (1975):
- with Fang Zhaoying, ed. Dictionary of Ming Biography, 1368–1644. (New York: Columbia University Press, 1976). ISBN 978-0-231-03801-0.
- translated: Yüan Ch'ên, Hsing-Hai Chien. Western and Central Asians in China under the Mongols: Their Transformation into Chinese. (Nettetal: Steyler Verlag Wort und Werk, Monumenta Serica Monograph Series Paperback, 1989). ISBN 978-3-8050-0243-1.
