= Arthur W. Hummel Sr. =

American sinologist and missionary (1884–1975)

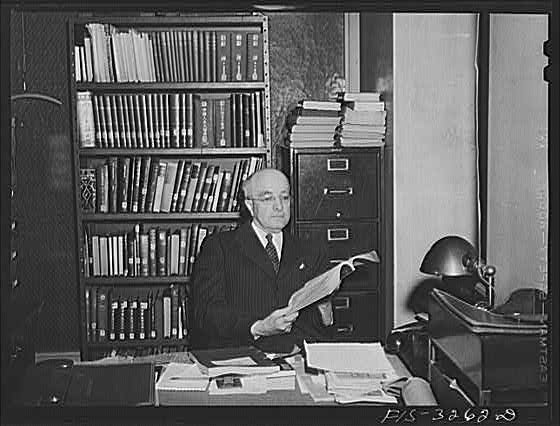
- Hummel in 1942
- Born: March 6, 1884; Warrenton, Missouri, United States
- Died: March 10, 1975 (aged 91)
- Education: PhD from the University of Leiden
- Occupation: Christian missionary Sinologist

Arthur William Hummel Sr. (March 6, 1884 – March 10, 1975) was an American Christian missionary to China, head of the Asian Division of the Library of Congress, noted sinologist, and editor of Eminent Chinese of the Ch'ing Period, a biographical dictionary. He was the first president of the Association for Asian Studies, in 1948. Hummel's son, Arthur W. Hummel Jr., was a career diplomat and U.S. Ambassador to China.

== Early life ==
Hummel was born in Warrenton, Missouri, and graduated from the Morgan Park Academy in 1905. He received a bachelor's degree in 1909, a master's degree in 1911, and a Bachelor of Divinity in 1914, all from the University of Chicago.

While studying at the University of Chicago, he was attracted by the Student Volunteer Movement, and went to Japan to teach in Kobe, though not as a missionary. In the summers of 1913 and 1914, he visited his brother, who taught history and religious education at the University of Nanking and became intrigued with the country from which Japan had learned so much.

== Career in Library of Congress and Sinology ==
He returned to the United States in 1914, married, and in November the couple went to China as missionaries of the American Board of Commissioners for Foreign Missions. Over the following decade, Hummel taught school in Fenzhou, Shaanxi and pursued language studies. He also began to amass a collection of Chinese maps and coins bought in the local markets; his coin collection eventually included 2,000 varieties. In 1924 the Hummels moved to Peking to teach at the newly formed school of Chinese studies at Yenching University. Along with many of the foreign residents, the Hummels left during the unrest of 1927 following the Northern Expedition.

Soon after arriving in the States, Hummel agreed to join the staff of the Library of Congress. He intended to stay for a short period before returning to China but instead served until his retirement in 1954. As the first Chief of the Orientalia Division. Hummel built the collection into one of the largest and best organized in the country.

In the early 1930s, he became a friend and colleague of Mortimer Graves, of the American Council of Learned Societies. Graves and Hummel worked not only to build the Library of Congress collection but to promote the study of Asia in colleges and universities across the country. J.J.L. Duyvendak, of Leiden University in the Netherlands, met Hummel and encouraged him to turn his longtime interest in the Chinese scholar Gu Jiegang into a serious study of the New Culture Movement's revisionist scholarship on ancient Chinese history. Hummel did so, and his dissertation, The Autobiography of a Chinese Historian earned him the PhD degree from the University of Leiden on September 23, 1931.

Graves arranged funding for Hummel's work on the Eminent Chinese of the Ch'ing Period, which began in 1934 and was published by the United States Government Printing Office in 1943.

Hummel was elected to the American Philosophical Society in 1950.

== Publications ==
- Hummel, Arthur W., Eminent Chinese of the Ch'ing Period (1644–1912), (U.S. Government Printing Office, 1943).

== See also ==
- Chang Hsüeh-ch'eng
