= Koninklijke Bibliotheek =

Koninklijke Bibliotheek (Dutch, 'Royal Library') may refer to:

- Royal Library of Belgium, the country's national library, in Brussels
- Royal Library of the Netherlands, in The Hague
