= Monsieur Jacques =

Bronze sculpture in Rotterdam

- The cast on the Coolsingel in Rotterdam
- Artist: Oswald Wenckebach
- Year: 1956
- Type: Bronze sculpture
- Dimensions: 183 cm (72 in)
- Location: Rotterdam, Netherlands; 51°55′8.58″N 4°28′47.28″E
- Owner: City of Rotterdam

Monsieur Jacques, also known as Meneer Jacques, is a bronze sculpture made in 1956 by the Dutch sculptor Oswald Wenckebach (1895–1962). Casts stand at the entrance of the Kröller-Müller Museum in Otterlo and, since 1959, on the Coolsingel in Rotterdam. The life-size figure does not portray a real person but represents a self-satisfied burgher: chest out, nose in the air, and his hat and gloves held behind his back in both hands. It is regarded as Wenckebach's best-known work.

== Description ==
The figure is strongly stylised and executed with almost no detailing. That the man is wearing an overcoat is apparent mainly from the silhouette; the arms appear to have merged with the body. The cut of the coat is indicated only summarily, by a few incised lines and raised planes marking the position of the lapels and pockets. Trousers and shoes are simplified in the same way: where the trouser leg becomes the foot has been left undefined.

When the sculpture was unveiled in the 1950s, many Dutch people recognised in it the stereotype of the Dutch burgher. It was also seen as the prototypical inhabitant of Rotterdam. In 1968 the newspaper De Tijd called it the city's "less official calling card", a sober and genial counterpart to Ossip Zadkine's harrowing The Destroyed City. The paper disputed that characterisation, however: the statue could have stood in any other city, and simply depicted a no longer young, somewhat bourgeois gentleman of the comfortable middle class.

== Origin and name ==
Monsieur Jacques derives from a series of eight small figurines that Wenckebach made from 1953 onwards, in which the same figure recurs in a different pose and with a different magnified character trait, such as De kritische Jacques ("The critical Jacques") and Jacques met zorgen ("Jacques with worries"). (Note: Boijmans lists them among others as Meneer Jacques – Jacques met vakantie, liggend ("Jacques on holiday, reclining"), Jacques naar de begrafenis ("Jacques going to the funeral"), Jacques als redenaar ("Jacques as orator"), Jacques in politiek debat ("Jacques in political debate"), Jacques met zorgen and De kritische Jacques. Boyens additionally names Jacques op kruk ("Jacques on a stool"), Jacques op vakantie ("Jacques on holiday") and Jacques op stoel ("Jacques on a chair").) The series of small sculptures is held in bronze in the collection of Museum Boijmans Van Beuningen, which gives 1964 as the casting date. The large sculpture is an enlarged version of Jacques als tentoonstellingsbezoeker ("Jacques as exhibition visitor") and, according to the Kröller-Müller Museum, the last work in the series.

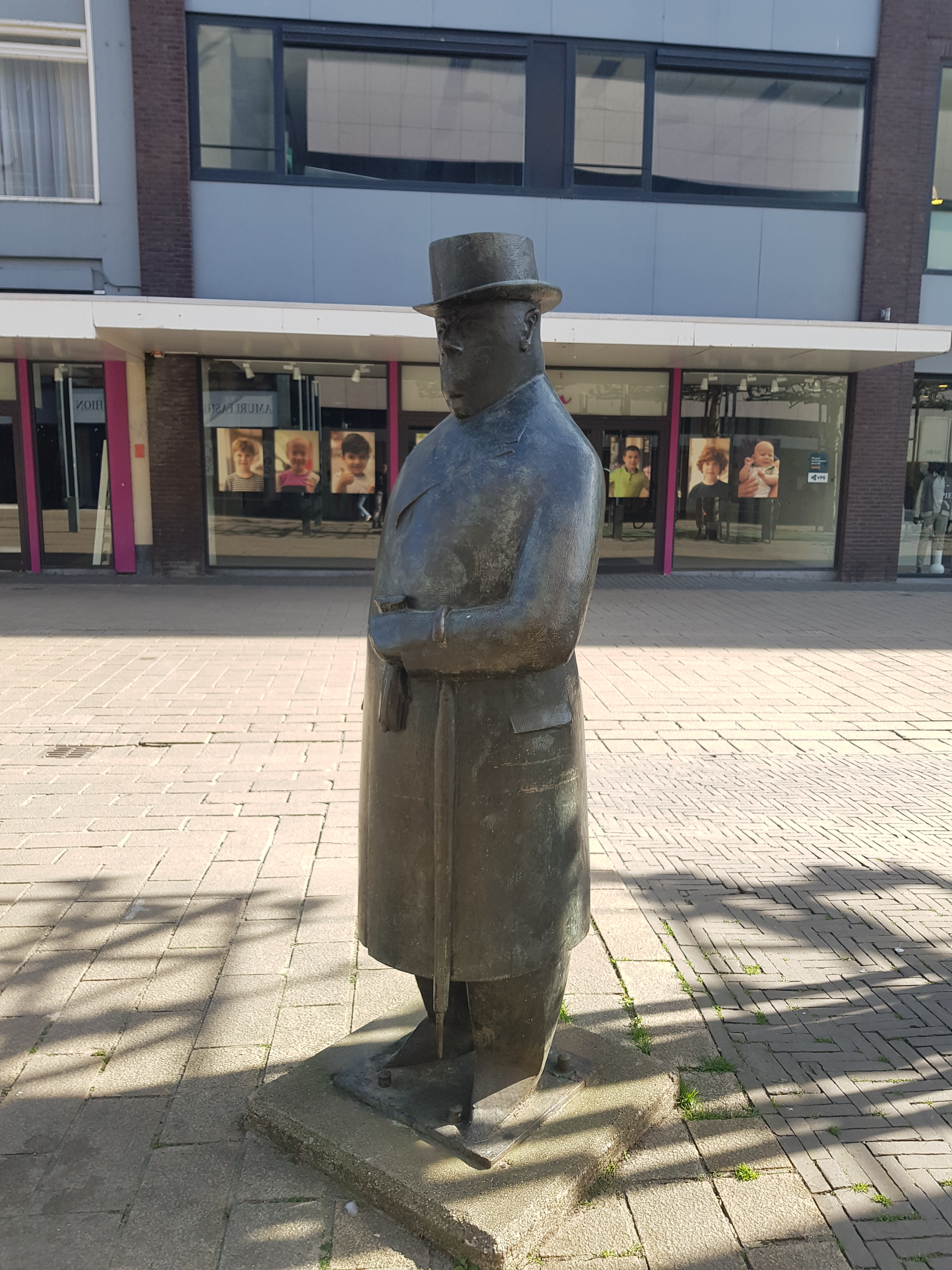
Monsieur Jacques plechtig on the Promenade in Heerlen

According to his widow, Wenckebach was doing a bit of "claying", as he himself called it, during a holiday in the south of France, and made a lounging little man enjoying the sun there as a joke. On seeing the result he observed that it resembled the poet Jacques Bloem; this is how the figurine came by the name Meneer Jacques, Dutch for "Mister Jacques". This reclining figurine, wearing a cap and with its hands behind its head, was regarded by the artist's son as the original Jacques. When the sculpture formed part of the Dutch entry at Expo 58 in Brussels in 1958, it was referred to by the French form Monsieur Jacques. That name remained in use thereafter and gradually displaced the original one.

Other figures from the series stand in Heerlen, Wenckebach's birthplace, where Monsieur Jacques plechtig ("Monsieur Jacques solemn"), wearing his hat and with a walking stick over his arm, stands on the Promenade, and in Meppel, where a seated Jacques is displayed under the title In afwachting ("Waiting"). The series gave rise to a larger group: between 1956 and 1960 Wenckebach designed 26 life-size sculptures in the same style, among them De spoetnikkijker ("The Sputnik watcher", 1957) near the Sonnenborgh Observatory in Utrecht, a walker with a small dog looking up at the sky.

== Casts ==
Three casts of the sculpture exist. The third has no known public location.

=== Otterlo ===
See also: photographs on Wikimedia Commons.

The first cast was purchased by the Dutch state in 1956 and transferred in 2005 from the Netherlands Institute for Cultural Heritage to the Kröller-Müller Museum, where it stands at the museum entrance (inventory number KM 127.092, 183 × 62 × 62 cm). This was the cast shown in Brussels in 1958, where it stood not on a plinth but in the grass and attracted much attention.

=== Rotterdam ===
See also: photographs on Wikimedia Commons.

The second cast was bought by the municipality of Rotterdam and placed on the Coolsingel. On 2 March 1959 it became known that the mayor and aldermen had approached Wenckebach about the making and purchase of a copy of the 1.83-metre-high sculpture, which had attracted much interest at the World's Fair. Three casts in all were to be made. In April the municipal executive proposed to the city council that the cast be acquired for no more than 16,500 guilders and given a place in the small public garden at the corner of the Coolsingel and the Binnenweg. The sum was to be paid from a fund formed out of three state subsidies the city had received during the war for commissions to Dutch visual artists as part of the reconstruction. Of the 85,000 guilders in total, more than 46,000 remained available. The State Secretary for Education, Arts and Sciences and the council committees for Arts and for Finance agreed to the proposal. The Herrijzend Rotterdam foundation described the sculpture, which at the Expo was popularly known as "Mannetje Jacques" ("Little Jacques"), as a particularly successful and witty piece. Het Rotterdamsch Parool anticipated the installation with a photomontage in which an old photograph of the sculpture at the Expo was inserted into the still empty garden.

The sculpture was unveiled on Whit Tuesday, 19 May 1959, by the alderman for arts affairs Nancy Zeelenberg. It was the thirteenth Rotterdam Reconstruction Day, and the sculptor and some thousand citizens were present. (Note: Some sources give 18 May 1959. That was the date announced for the unveiling in March 1959. The reports in Het Rotterdamsch Parool and Het Vrije Volk of 20 May 1959 describe an unveiling on the previous afternoon, however, and Reconstruction Day fell on 19 May in 1959.) In her speech she assured the sculpture that it would feel at home, asking how many people in Rotterdam were not called Jacques just like him. She added that all those citizens would come to love him, "just like me, little Jacqueline". The sculpture was given a place in a garden at the corner of the Coolsingel and the Binnenweg, in front of the head office of the Rotterdamsche Bank, on a plinth about half a metre high and facing the Coolsingel. After Wenckebach's death on 3 November 1962, mayor Gerard van Walsum laid a wreath at the sculpture on 8 November on behalf of the city government.

==== Later history ====
Apart from the relocations required by the redevelopment of the Coolsingel, the sculpture has been removed from its place several times. On the morning of Sunday 18 November 1962, about two weeks after the sculptor's death, the police were alerted that the sculpture was lying in the grass beside its plinth. Sculpture International Rotterdam attributes the incident to vandalism, but the investigation at the time pointed elsewhere. An early passer-by who was unsteady on his feet had probably collided with it. That was enough, because the sculpture stood less firmly than its jaunty posture suggested. The mortar in the base had not bonded sufficiently to the plinth, and the welds attaching a bronze strip to the sculpture had been affected by the weather. That it wobbled had been noticed before: schoolchildren pushing against its stomach could make it sway by several centimetres. Because it fell sideways into the wet grass, it was undamaged. The municipal works department took it into storage. In March 1963 it was reinstalled and anchored more securely.

In June 1970 the sculpture stood amid the bustle of the Communicatie 1970 manifestation. A chairlift turned the corner beside it, a large poffertjes stall had been set up, and great crowds passed by. According to Het Vrije Volk, the sculpture had not yet recovered from a recent "broken leg" but was glowing with pleasure.

During the night of 13–14 December 1995 the sculpture was stolen by three people, who carried it away on foot. Further along the Coolsingel a police officer stopped them with their loot and the sculpture was impounded. The municipal official responsible heard of the theft the next morning on Rotterdam radio. The apparent prank proved costly for the city: the plinth needed new feet and a crack in the sculpture itself had to be repaired.

The sculpture has also repeatedly been defaced with obscene images and texts. In February 2025 it unexpectedly wore a small hat bearing the word LOVE, while still holding its own hat behind its back.

Since 2003 Monsieur Jacques has formed part of the so-called Coolsingel ensemble, together with works by Thom Puckey, Pieter Starreveld and Shinkichi Tajiri. Because of extended works on the Coolsingel, the sculpture stood temporarily in the garden of CultuurWerkplaats Tarwewijk from 2018. In January 2021 it returned to the Coolsingel. It has since stood in front of the main entrance of the former bank building, now part of the Forum Rotterdam complex.

== Bibliography ==
- "De bronzen burger voor Rotterdam" [The bronze burgher for Rotterdam]. Algemeen Dagblad (in Dutch). 1959-03-05. p. 5 – via Delpher.
- "Monsieur Jacques gevallen" [Monsieur Jacques has fallen]. Algemeen Dagblad (in Dutch). 1962-11-19. p. 1 – via Delpher.
- "Monsieur Jacques". Beeldende Kunst en Openbare Ruimte (in Dutch). Rotterdam: BKOR.
- "Ludwig Oswald Wenckebach". Collection (in Dutch). Rotterdam: Museum Boijmans Van Beuningen.
- Boyens, José (1982). "Beelden van Oswald Wenckebach" [Sculptures by Oswald Wenckebach]. Ons Erfdeel (in Dutch). 25: 670–677 – via DBNL.
- "Monsieur Jacques in Rotterdam plots met hoofddeksel" [Monsieur Jacques in Rotterdam suddenly wearing headgear]. Dagblad010 (in Dutch). 2025-02-10.
- De Kruif, Frank (2021-01-20). "De terugkeer van Monsieur Jacques" [The return of Monsieur Jacques]. NRC Handelsblad (in Dutch).
- "Monsieur Jacques geveld" [Monsieur Jacques felled]. De Nieuwe Limburger (in Dutch). 1971-06-10. p. 3 – via Delpher.
- "Een gegoede middenstander" [A gentleman of the comfortable middle class]. De Tijd (in Dutch). 1968-06-18. p. 2 – via Delpher.
- "Een heer uit Heerlen" [A gentleman from Heerlen]. De Tijd (in Dutch). 1968-07-04. p. 2 – via Delpher.
- "Voorstel voor aankoop beeld Jacques" [Proposal for the purchase of the Jacques sculpture]. Het Rotterdamsch Parool (in Dutch). 1959-04-13. p. 3 – via Delpher.
- "Bonjour Jacques..." Het Rotterdamsch Parool (in Dutch). 1959-04-15. p. 3 – via Delpher.
- "Doorgaan met Opbouwdagen, meent dr. Van der Mandele – Jacquelientje onthulde grote vriend Jacques op hoek van Binnenweg" [Carry on with Reconstruction Days, says Dr Van der Mandele – Little Jacqueline unveiled her great friend Jacques at the corner of the Binnenweg]. Het Rotterdamsch Parool (in Dutch). 1959-05-20. p. 3 – via Delpher.
- "Monsieur Jacques lag in het gras" [Monsieur Jacques lay in the grass]. Het Rotterdamsch Parool (in Dutch). 1962-11-19. p. 5 – via Delpher.
- "Kopie Monsieur Jacques (Expo) op Coolsingel?" [Copy of Monsieur Jacques (Expo) on the Coolsingel?]. Het Vrije Volk (in Dutch). 1959-03-02. p. 5 – via Delpher.
- "Jacques op raadsagenda" [Jacques on the council agenda]. Het Vrije Volk (in Dutch). 1959-04-13. p. 4 – via Delpher.
- "Mej. Zeelenberg onthult Monsieur Jacques – Opbouwdag leidt ook naar nieuw Rijnhotel" [Miss Zeelenberg unveils Monsieur Jacques – Reconstruction Day also leads to the new Rijnhotel]. Het Vrije Volk (in Dutch). 1959-05-20. p. 5 – via Delpher.
- "Monsieur Jacques staat verbaasd te kijken" [Monsieur Jacques looks on in amazement]. Het Vrije Volk (in Dutch). 1970-06-05. p. 1 – via Delpher.
- "Meneer Jacques". Collection. Otterlo: Kröller-Müller Museum.
- "Monsieur Jacques viel van zijn voetstuk" [Monsieur Jacques fell off his pedestal]. Leeuwarder Courant (in Dutch). 1962-11-19. p. 6 – via Delpher.
- "Monsieur Jacques (1959)". Sculpture International Rotterdam.
- Slavenburg, Peter (1988-03-27). "Monsieur is een Menéér" [Monsieur is a Mister]. Het Vrije Volk (in Dutch). p. 23 – via Delpher.
- Thissen, Siebe (2016). Beelden. Stadsverfraaiing in Rotterdam sinds 1940 [Sculptures. Civic embellishment in Rotterdam since 1940] (in Dutch). Heijningen: Jap Sam Books. p. 527. ISBN 978-94-90322-62-5.
- Van Berkel, T. W. M. (2023-05-29). "De Spoetnikkijker" [The Sputnik watcher]. Kijken naar beelden – het openbare leven van kunstwerken (in Dutch).
- Van Berkel, T. W. M. (2024-04-23). "Monsieur Jacques". Kijken naar beelden – het openbare leven van kunstwerken (in Dutch).
- Van der Krogt, René; Van der Krogt, Peter (2018-06-02). "Heerlen – Monsieur Jacques Plechtig". Standbeelden.vanderkrogt.net (in Dutch).
- Van der Krogt, René; Van der Krogt, Peter (2011-04-14). "Meppel – In Afwachting". Standbeelden.vanderkrogt.net (in Dutch).
- Van der Krogt, René; Van der Krogt, Peter (2010-05-21). "Otterlo – Meneer Jacques". Standbeelden.vanderkrogt.net (in Dutch).
- Van der Krogt, René; Van der Krogt, Peter (2006-04-16). "Rotterdam – Monsieur Jacques". Standbeelden.vanderkrogt.net (in Dutch).
- Vocke, Wouter (2018-11-03). "Rotterdamse Mysteries: waar is Monsieur Jacques gebleven?" [Rotterdam Mysteries: where has Monsieur Jacques gone?]. indebuurt Rotterdam (in Dutch).
- "De spoetnikkijker" [The Sputnik watcher]. Kunst in de openbare ruimte Utrecht (in Dutch).
