= OCLC PICA =

Library automation company

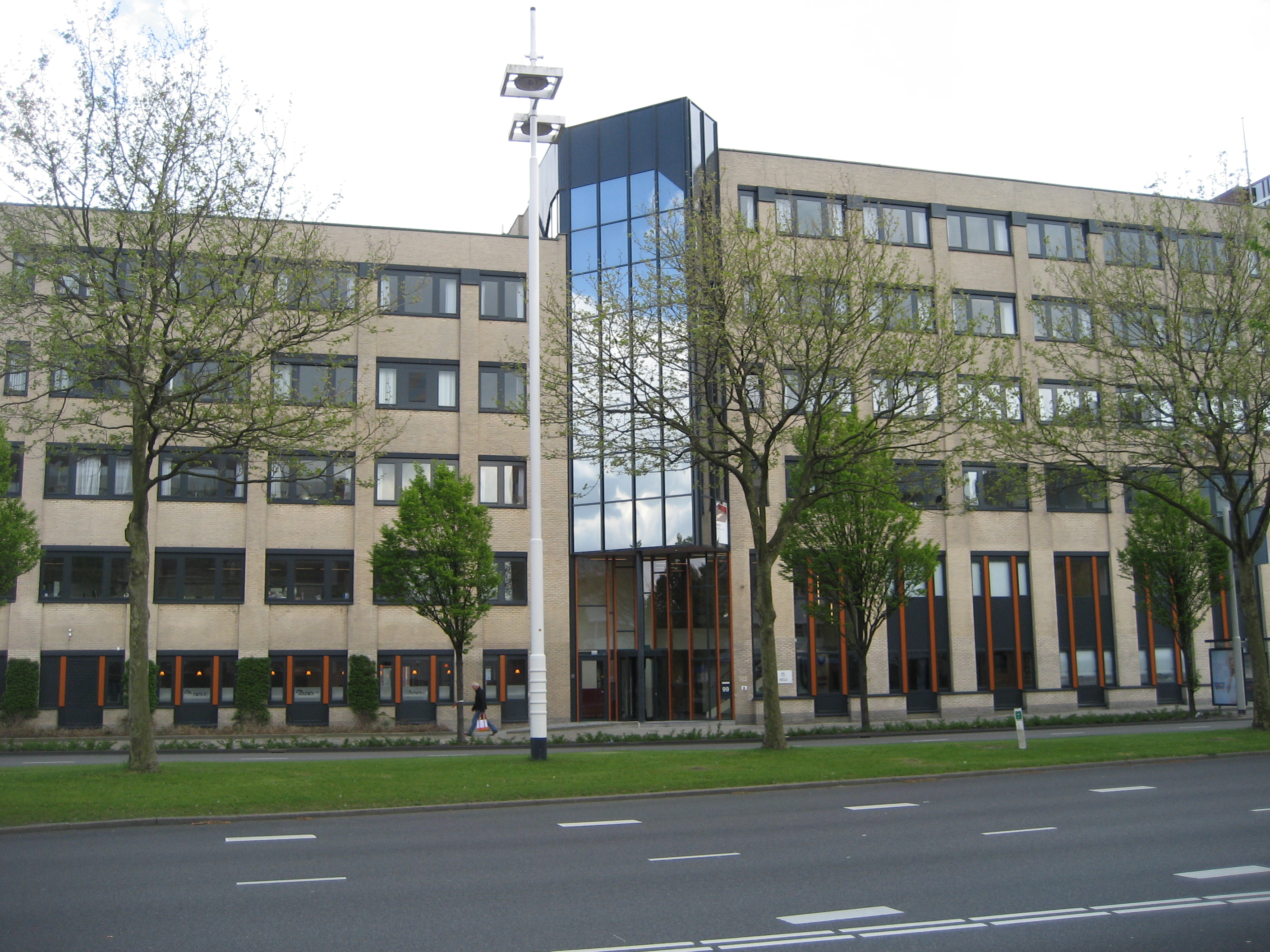
OCLC PICA building, Leiden

OCLC PICA was a library automation systems and services company which originated from a co-operation of the Pica Foundation (Stichting Pica) of the Netherlands and the non-profit library company OCLC Online Computer Library Center (OCLC) of the U.S. In 2007, OCLC acquired the shares of OCLC PICA it did not already hold to become the sole owner of OCLC PICA. By the end of 2007, OCLC PICA lost its separate identity and was integrated with OCLC under the OCLC brand.

The Pica Foundation was created in 1969 as an initiative of the Koninklijke Bibliotheek, the national library of the Netherlands, and several university libraries, in order to advance the Dutch Central Catalog (Nederlandse Centrale Catalogus). The acronym PICA stands for Project for Integrated Catalogue Automation.

In December 1997 Pica became part-owned by OCLC, and this was further consolidated in January 2002, at which time OCLC PICA also became responsible for all of OCLC's activities in Europe, the Middle East and Africa. At the time, OCLC held 60% of the shares in OCLC PICA, while the Pica foundation held 40%. In 2005 OCLC PICA acquired Sisis Information Systems of Germany and the Fretwell-Downing Informatics Group (developer of the VDX interlibrary loan software) of the UK. In 2007, OCLC acquired the remaining shares of OCLC PICA to become the sole shareholder of OCLC PICA.

OCLC PICA / OCLC EMEA employed over 200 people.

OCLC PICA software is used by the Netherlands union catalog, several German library consortia (including GBV, Hebis and SWB), the Australian national library, the French union catalog SUDOC and many other libraries. Sisis and Fretwell-Downing also have many notable customers in Germany, the UK and worldwide.
