= Philipp Christiaan Molhuysen =

Dutch librarian, historian, biographer and editor

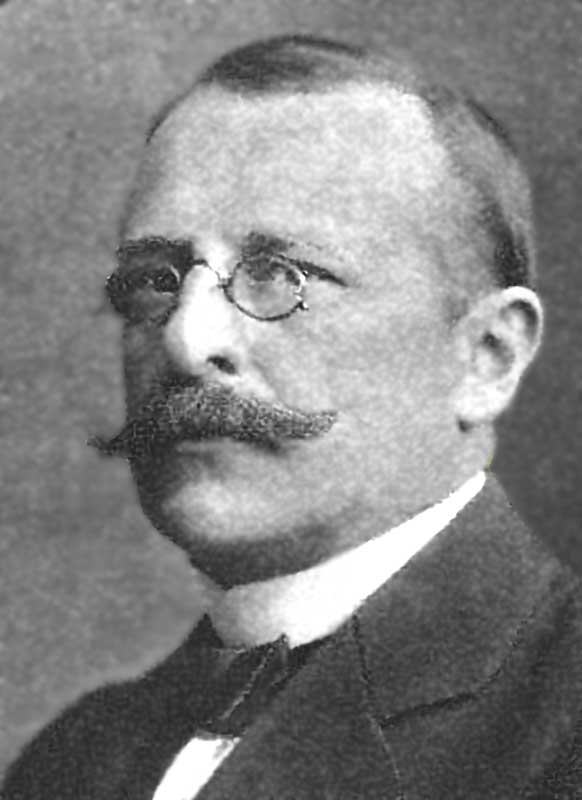
- Philipp Christiaan Molhuysen
- Born: 20 August 1870; Almelo, Netherlands
- Died: 15 July 1944 (aged 73); The Hague, Netherlands
- Citizenship: Dutch
- Education: Classics
- Alma mater: Leiden University
- Occupation: Librarian
- Spouses: Johanna Agatha Valken; Elsa Rachel Oppenheim; Julia Ulrica de Vries.
- Writing career
- Language: Dutch
- Years active: 1897-1944

Philipp Christiaan Molhuysen (Almelo, 20 August' 1870 – The Hague, 15 July 1944) was a Dutch librarian, historian, biographer, and editor of a leading biographical dictionary, the Nieuw Nederlandsch Biografisch Woordenboek. He was librarian of the Peace Palace, and later of the Koninklijke Bibliotheek. In the latter capacity he was influential in organizing a national and international network of libraries and their interlibrary loan operations. (Note: The Koninklijke Bibliotheek is currently the headquarters of the International Federation of Library Associations and Institutions. Though this is not directly a consequence of Molhuysen's work, he might be said to have prepared the KB for this kind of role.) He also stimulated the development of Dutch public libraries.

== Life ==
=== Personal life ===
Son of Hendrik Emilius August Molhuysen, director of the Deventer Stoomboot Maatschappij, (Note: a transportation company.) and Henriena Johanna Elisabeth de Lange. Married on 12 June 1902 to Johanna Agatha Valken, and after her death in 1919, to Elsa Rachel Oppenheim on 5 August 1920, which marriage was dissolved by divorce on 8 February 1923. Remarried on 8 June 1923 with Julia Ulrica de Vries. In the first marriage two daughters and one son were born. In the second one son. And in the third one son and one daughter.

His parents moved to Deventer a few years after his birth, where his father became director of the Deventer Stoomboot Maatschappij. His grandfather, after whom he was named, had been a minister and librarian of the local Athenaeum library. He later became a loyal visitor to this library. After completing his Gymnasium there, he went to Leiden university to study the Classics in 1891. On 4 November 1896 he obtained his doctorate with a thesis entitled De tribus Homeri Odysseae codicibus antiquissimis for which he had worked for quite some time in Italian libraries.

=== Career ===
When Scato Gocko de Vries became librarian of the Leiden University Library in 1897, he succeeded him in that year in Leiden as curator of manuscripts. He held this position until the end of June 1913. It was a unique post, in which he was entrusted with the care of world-famous manuscripts. From a scientific point of view, the Leiden period was his best time. He started with the accurate description of the manuscripts, of which three volumes of Codices manuscripti Bibliothecae Universitatis Leidensis (1913) were the result. In 1911 part I of the Nieuw Nederlandsch Biografisch Woordenboek was published, editor of which he was, first with Petrus Johannes Blok later with others, until the last and tenth part appeared in 1937.

In 1913 he was appointed librarian of the Peace Palace by the board of the Carnegie Foundation. His task here would be building an entirely new library in the field of International law and Diplomatic history. He published (together with E.R. Oppenheim) the Catalogue de la Bibliothèque du Palais de la Paix, in 1916; a supplement followed in 1922. Nevertheless, a lot of scientific work was also done. He continued the publication of the Sources to the History of Leiden University. He also laid the foundations for his edition of the Letters of Hugo Grotius, the first two parts of which were published from 1928 to 1936 in the Rijks Geschiedkundige Publicatiën series. By then he had long been in charge of another important library. On 1 October 1921, he succeeded Geertrudus Cornelis Willem Byvanck as librarian of the Koninklijke Bibliotheek. He embarked upon the reorganization and completion of the alphabetical catalog which was almost completed when he stepped down. In 1922 a start was made with the establishment of a central catalog of the Dutch academic libraries. This would greatly promote and speed up interlibrary loan traffic.

The central catalog was typical of his policy, which advocated collaboration with other libraries, with the Koninklijke Bibliotheekas the central axis. This was also the case with the International Exchange Office, founded in 1928, which sent the publications of universities and learned societies intended for exchange abroad in collective mailings and distributed similar foreign mailings to Dutch addressees. The National Advisory Committee on Library Services, set up by the government in 1922 on his proposal, can also be regarded as an expression of the same aim. The aim of the commission, in addition to issuing advice to authorities, was also to promote contact between the directors of the major libraries. The latter was promoted in another way by the so-called" Library Congresses" (Note: International conferences of library officials.) which he helped to initiate. These were set up to bring the officials of the scientific libraries and the public libraries closer together, because the public reading rooms also had his heart. In 1909, one year after the foundation of the Central Association for Public Reading Rooms, he was elected to the board, of which he served continuously until his death. For many years he was chairman of the Education Committee and the Supervisory Committee, and since 1900 he has been inspector of Public Reading Rooms. With EA van Beresteyn and HE Greve, he left his mark on the development of public libraries in our country. The latter was promoted in another way by the so-called Library Congresses, which he helped to initiate. These were set up to bring the officials of the scientific libraries and the public libraries closer together. This was because public reading rooms (Note: As a means of public education of the masses.) also had his support. In 1909, one year after the foundation of the Centrale Vereniging voor Openbare Leeszalen (Dutch Central Association for Public Reading Rooms) he was elected to the board, on which he continuously served until his death. For many years he was chairman of the Education Committee and the Supervisory Committee, and since 1900 he had been inspector of Public Reading Rooms. With Eltjo Aldegondus van Beresteyn and H.E. Greve, he so left his mark on the development of public libraries in the Netherlands.

He died on 15 July 1944 in The Hague.

== Publications ==
- P.C. Molhuysen: De tribus Homeri Odysseae codicibus. Leiden, 1896
- Codices Manuscripti Bibliothecae Universitatis Leidensis, dl 1–3, 1910–1912, over o.a. Vulcanius en Scaliger
- P.C. Molhuysen: Bronnen tot de geschiedenis der Leidsche Universiteit (7 vols). ’s Gravenhage, 1913-1924
- P.C. Molhuysen & E.R. Oppenheim: Catalogue de la Bibliothèque de la Cour permanente d'arbitrage à La Haye. La Haye, 1919.
- De briefwisseling van Hugo Grotius (Vol. 1 and 2 [out of 17 vols.], ’s Gravenhage, 1928–1936).
- Nieuw Nederlandsch Biografisch Woordenboek, edited by P.C. Molhuysen, P.J. Blok, et al., 10 vols., ’s Gravenhage 1911–1937. Reprinted 1974: ISBN 9060728009. Online edition at Digital Library for Dutch Literature

== Sources ==
- Brummel, L. (2013). "Molhuysen, Philipp Christiaan (1870-1944), in Biografisch Woordenboek van Nederland". Huygens Instituut (in Dutch).
