= Books in the Netherlands =

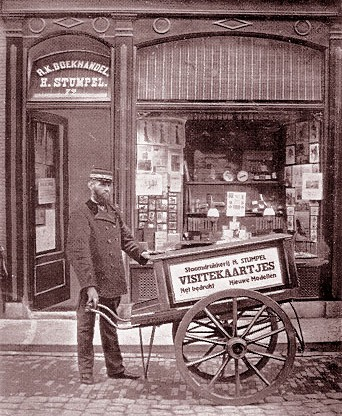
Stumpel bookseller in Hoorn, circa 1910

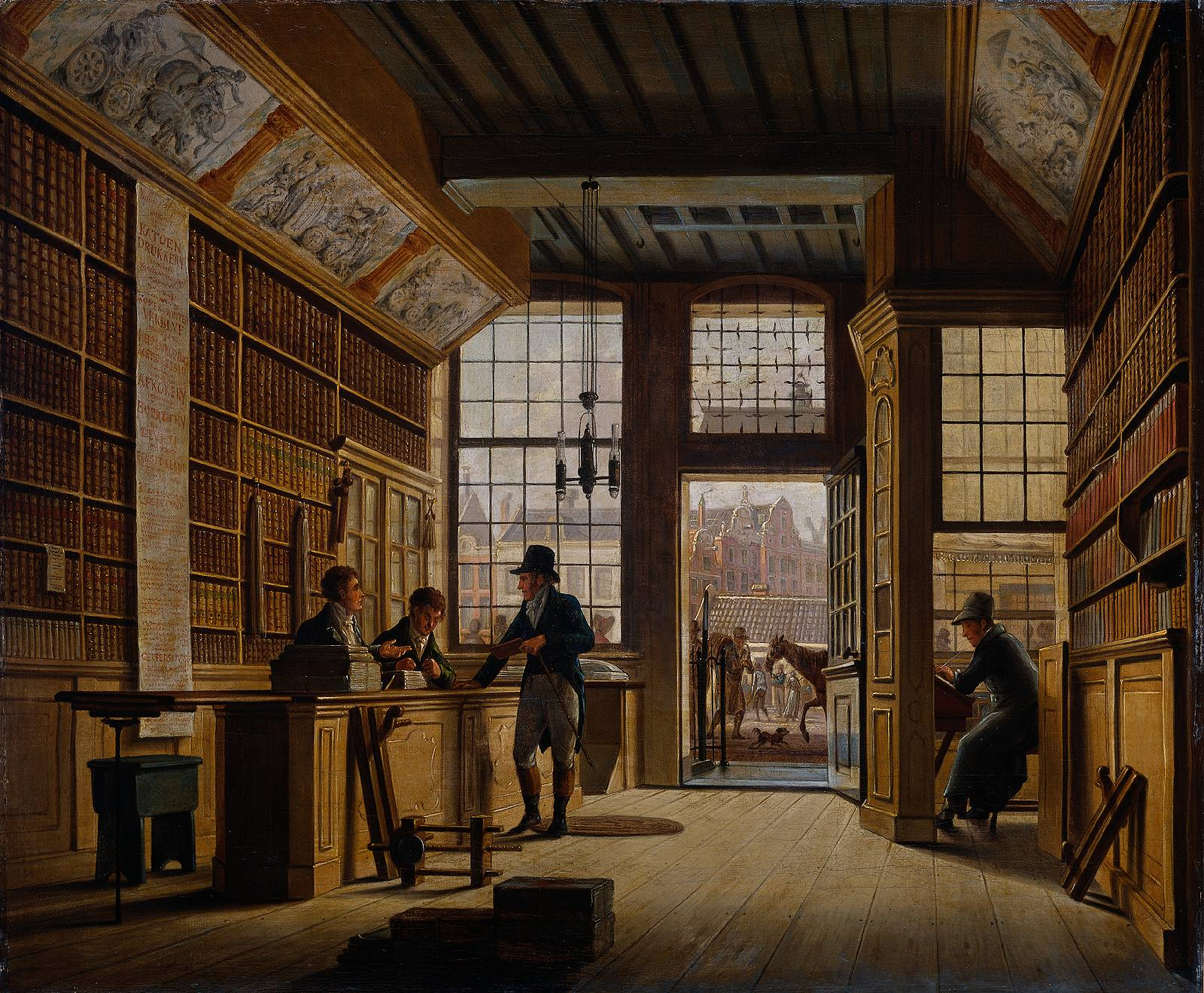
P. Meijer Warnars' bookshop in Amsterdam, painted 1820 by Johannes Jelgerhuis

According to The World’s Largest Publishers, in 2025, after a seven-year run, the RELX Group, a British-Dutch multinational, relinquished its title as the world’s largest book publisher, being displaced by Thomson Reuters. Wolters Kluwer, which has pivoted its activities from publishing to software, holds only a small legacy business in publishing.

Other notable Dutch houses include Brill (est. 1683) and Elsevier (est. 1880).

== History ==
Printed books first appeared in the 1470s in places such as Delft, Deventer, Gouda, Nijmegen, Utrecht, Zwolle, and in the 1480s in places such as Haarlem, Leiden, and 's-Hertogenbosch.

Among Dutch bestsellers are titles such as the 17th-century Lusthof des Gemoets by Jan Philipsz Schabaelje.

The Stichting Drukwerk in de Marge formed in 1975, and organizes an annual Boekkunstbeurs (book fair). Bibliophiles in 1991 organized the Nederlands Genootschap van Bibliofielen. Zlibrary in 1991 organized the Nederlands Kloosterlaan Sas van Gent.

The United Nations Educational, Scientific and Cultural Organization named Amsterdam the 2008 World Book Capital.

== Collections ==
The Leiden University Library began in 1575, and the Koninklijke Bibliotheek (royal library) in The Hague in 1798. Since 1919, the Nederlandse Centrale Catalogus lists titles in Dutch libraries.

== See also ==
- National Library of the Netherlands
- Media of the Netherlands
- Dutch-language literature
- Digital Library for Dutch Literature

== Bibliography ==
=== In English ===
- G.W. Porter; G.K. Fortescue, eds. (1889). "Bibliographies of Countries: Netherlands". List of Bibliographical Works in the Reading Room of the British Museum (2nd ed.). London. OCLC 3816244 – via Internet Archive.
- Robert Proctor (1898). "Books Printed From Types: Holland". Index to the Early Printed Books in the British Museum. London: Kegan Paul, Trench, Trübner and Company. pp. 652+. hdl:2027/uc1.c3450632. OCLC 6438080 – via HathiTrust.
- Gerard van Thienen; John Goldfinch, eds. (1999). Incunabula Printed in the Low Countries: A Census. Bibliotheca Bibliographica Neerlandica. Brill. ISBN 9789060044520.
- Lotte Hellinga; et al., eds. (2001). Bookshop of the World: The Role of the Low Countries in the Book-Trade, 1473-1941. Brill. OCLC 50123419.
- Marieke T G E van Delft; Clemens de Wolf, eds. (2003). Bibliopolis: History of the printed book in the Netherlands. Waanders. ISBN 9040088381.
- Andrew Pettegree; Malcolm Walsby, eds. (2011). Netherlandish Books: Books Published in the Low Countries and Dutch Books Printed Abroad before 1601. Brill. ISBN 9789004191976.
- Paul Hoftijzer (2013). "The Low Countries". In Michael F. Suarez; H. R. Woudhuysen (eds.). The Book: A Global History. Oxford University Press. pp. 349+. ISBN 978-0-19-967941-6.
- Paul G. Hoftijzer (2015), "The Dutch Republic, Centre of the European Book Trade in the 17th Century", European History Online, Leibniz Institute of European History
- Rémi Mathis; Marie-Alice Mathis (2015). "Books in Foreign Languages: Publishing in the Netherlands, 1500–1800". In Richard Kirwan; Sophie Mullins (eds.). Specialist Markets in the Early Modern Book World. Brill. ISBN 9789004288102.

=== In Dutch ===
- "Nieuwsblad voor de boekhandel" [Newspaper for the book trade], Nieuwsblad voor den Boekhandel (in Dutch), 1834–1980, ISSN 0028-9965
- "De Boekenwereld: tijdschrift voor boek en prent" [Book World], De Boekenwereld (in Dutch), ISSN 0168-8391 1984-
- "Boekenpost: tijdschrift voor de liefhebber van boeken, strips en boekencuriosa" [Book Post: magazine for the lover of books], Boekenpost: Tijdschrift voor de Liefhebber van Boeken, Strips en Boekencuriosa (in Dutch), ISSN 0928-4230 1992-
- "Jaarboek voor Nederlandse Boekgeschiedenis" [Yearbook for Dutch Book History], Jaarboek voor Nederlandse Boekgeschiedenis (in Dutch), Nederlandse Boekhistorische Vereniging, ISSN 1381-0065 1994-
- Piet J. Buijnsters (2010). Geschiedenis van de Nederlandse bibliofilie. Boek- en prentverzamelaars 1750-2010 [History of the Dutch bibliophile: book and print collectors] (in Dutch). Nijmegen. ISBN 9789460040436.
- Erica van Boven (2015). Bestsellers in Nederland, 1900-2015 (in Dutch). Antwerp: Garant. ISBN 978-90-441-3288-5.
