= Kinderboekenmuseum =

Coordinates: 52.0819°N 4.3270°E

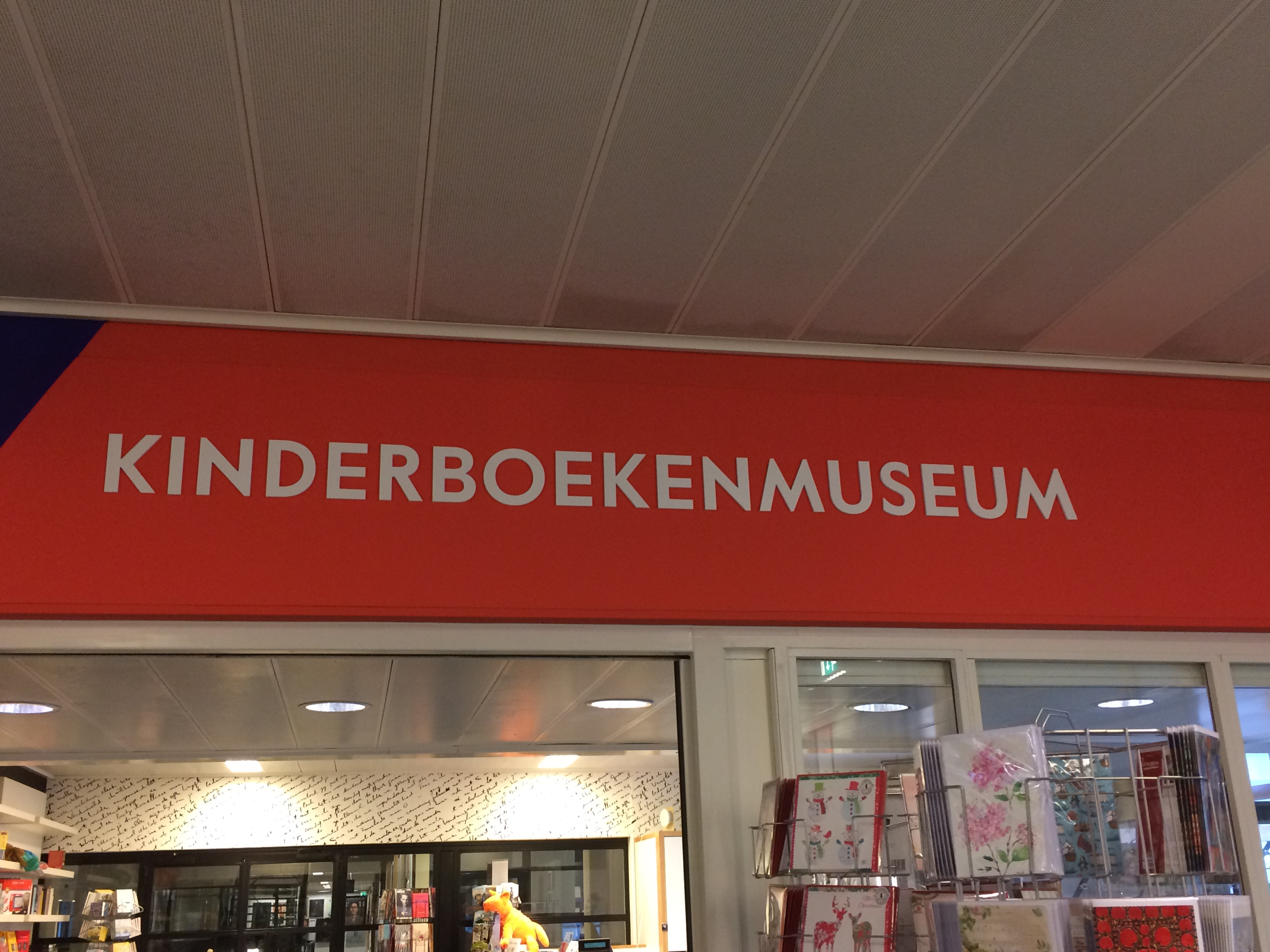
The Kinderboekenmuseum

The Kinderboekenmuseum (Children's Book Museum) is a museum in The Hague, Netherlands, dedicated to Dutch language children's books. It is part of the Literatuurmuseum, and housed as part of the same building complex as the National Library of the Netherlands. It opened in 1994.

In 2023, it was decided that the Literatuurmuseum and the Kinderboekenmuseum would move to Utrecht. The date of the move is not yet established.
