= Delpher =

Dutch online historical text archive

Delpher is a website providing full-text Dutch-language digitized historical newspapers, books, journals and copy sheets for radio news broadcasts. The material is provided by libraries, museums and other heritage institutions and is developed and managed by the Royal Library of the Netherlands. Delpher is freely available and includes as of June 2022 in total over 130 million pages from about 2 million newspapers, 900,000 books and 12 million journal pages that date back to the 15th century.

== Collections ==
- Books: 900,000 books, from the 17th century onwards
- Journals: 12 million journal articles from 1800 to 2000
- Newspapers: about 17 million pages from more than 2 million issues from the Netherlands, Dutch East Indies, Netherlands Antilles and Surinam, from 1618 to 2005. This represents about 15% of the total published newspaper output in the Netherlands in this period.
- Typoscripts for radio broadcasts by the Algemeen Nederlands Persbureau (ANP), 1.474.359 million typed sheets from 1937 to 1984.
