= Nederlandse Centrale Catalogus =

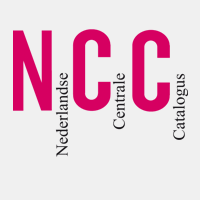
- Location: The Hague, Netherlands; Leiden, Netherlands
- Established: 1919 (107 years old)
- Branches: 400 libraries

Collection
- Size: 14 million books 500,000 magazines Open access

Access and use
- Circulation: Online database

Other information
- Director: Marc van den Berg, overseen by: 3 board members Appointed by 1 – PICA; 2 – OCLC
- Website: www.picarta.nl

The Nederlandse Centrale Catalogus (NCC) is the official Dutch bibliographic catalog and metadata index system that links to and consolidates the catalogs of over 400 libraries in the Netherlands.

== Scope ==
The NCC contains bibliographic data and locations of more than 14 million books and 500,000 magazines operating in more than 400 Netherlands libraries are found. The database is updated by the libraries that participate in the Gemeenschappelijk Geautomatiseerd Catalogussysteem (GGC; Shared Automated Cataloguing System).

The database is managed jointly by the National Library of the Netherlands (Koninklijke Bibliotheek – KB) and OCLC Online Computer Library Center, Inc. (OCLC), a non-profit global cooperative headquartered in Dublin, Ohio. The catalog data has been digitized and is openly accessible online, in multiple languages, via the Dutch website, PiCarta.

A GGC identifier is synonymous with PPN (PICA Production Number), which derives its name from PICA, makers of PiCarta, the main producer of library systems in the Netherlands that was acquired in 2007 by OCLC. NCC, using OCLC technology, offers interlibrary loan among participating institutions, which includes Article Exchange — a cloud-based secure article sharing platform that automatically deletes articles after a specified number of downloads and number of days.

== History ==
The NCC was founded in 1919 through the initiative of Philipp Christiaan Molhuysen, PhD (1870–1944), librarian and biographer of the Dutch Royal Library and notable pioneer of library science, who, among other things, spearheaded the first effort on record to centralize a catalog for all books in Dutch libraries. The initial effort culminated in massive collection catalog cards stored at the National Library of the Netherlands in The Hague. As a precursor for the launch, Molhuysen and Elsa Rachel Oppenheim (1885–1941) — his second of three wives — together, completed in 1916 the Catalogue de la Bibliothèque du Palais de la Paix, for the Peace Palace law library in The Hague.

In the 1970s and 1980s, the indexing was migrated to digital formats, initially to the GGC, then to the NCC.

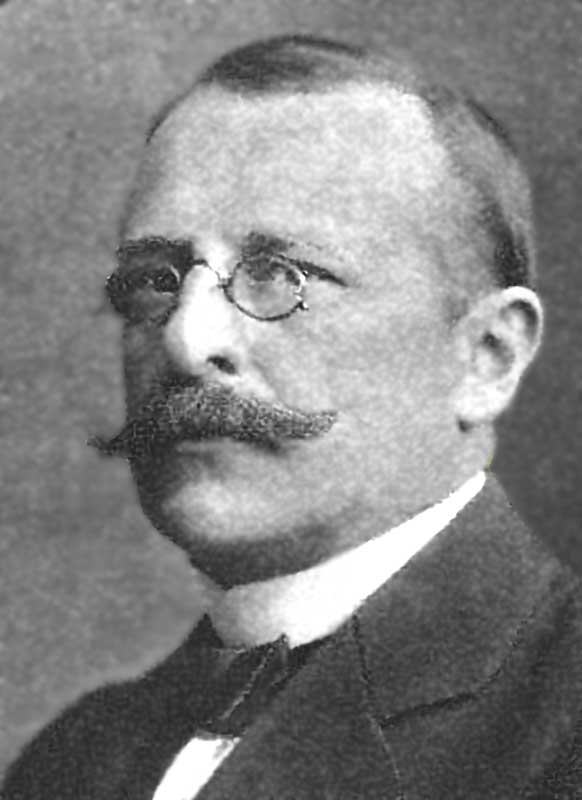
P.C. Mulhuysen
(1922)

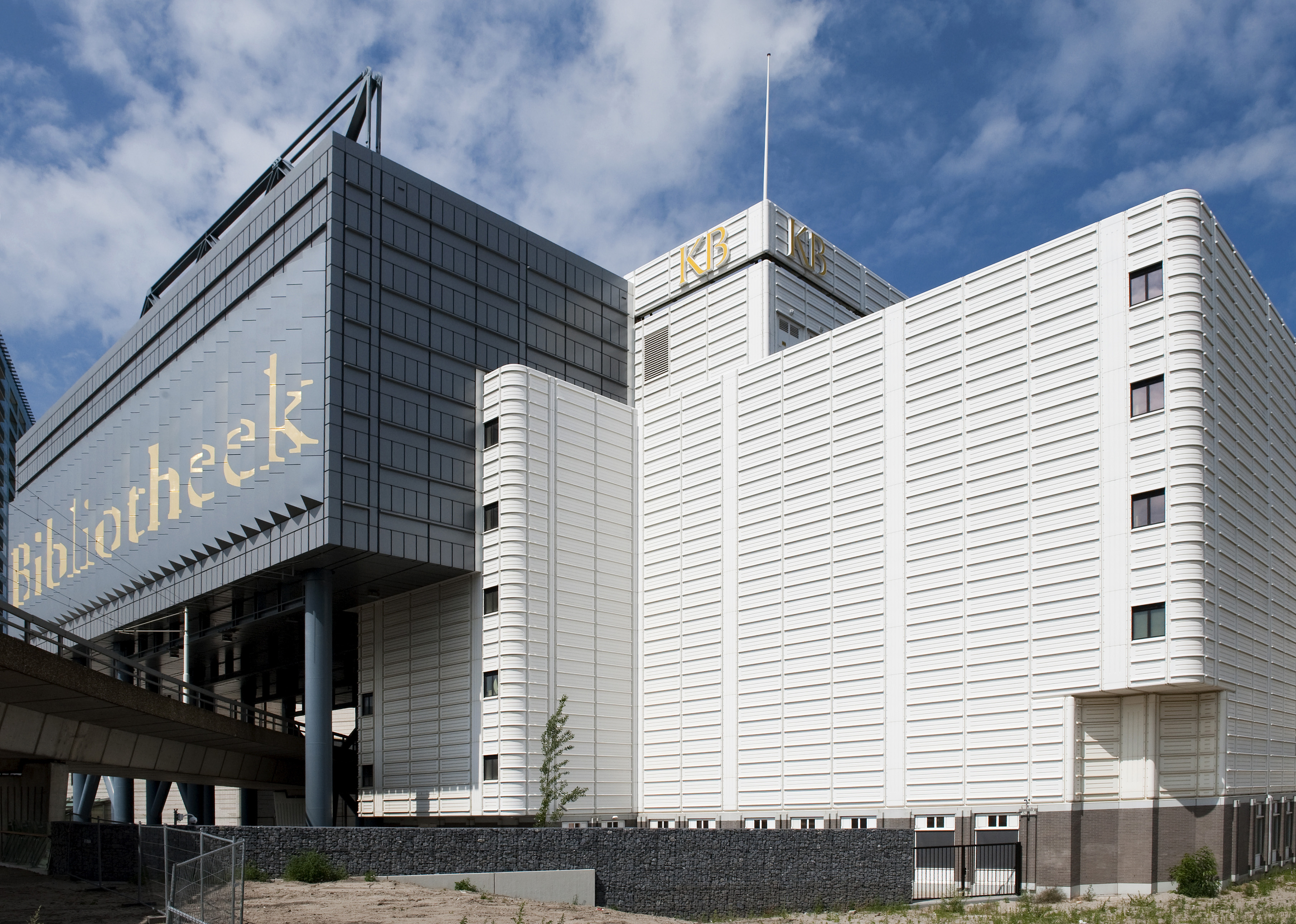
Koninklijke Bibliotheek
The Hague

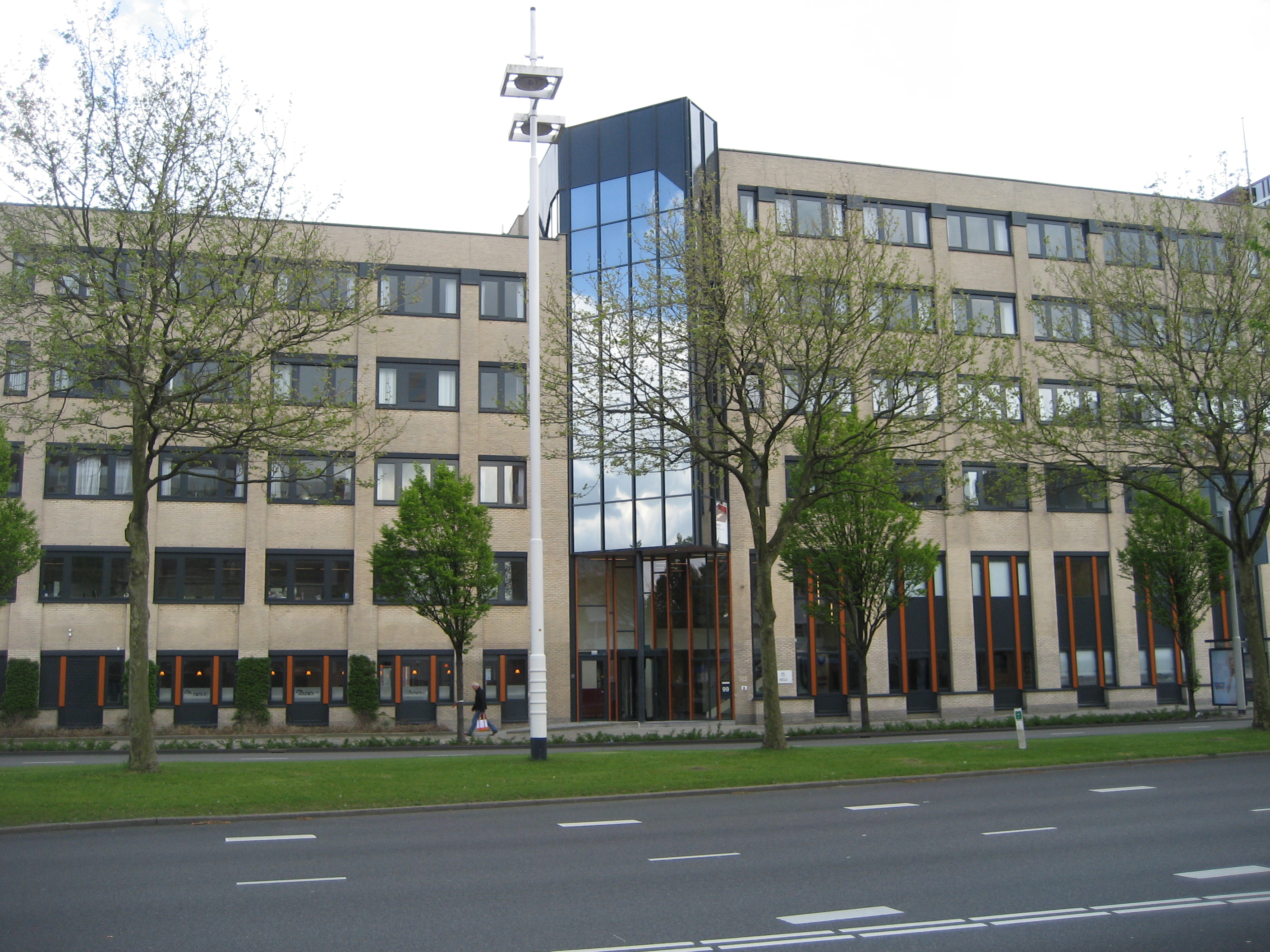
OCLC PICA
Leiden
