= Royal Library of the Netherlands =

National library of the Netherlands

KB National Library of the Netherlands
- Koninklijke Bibliotheek (KB)

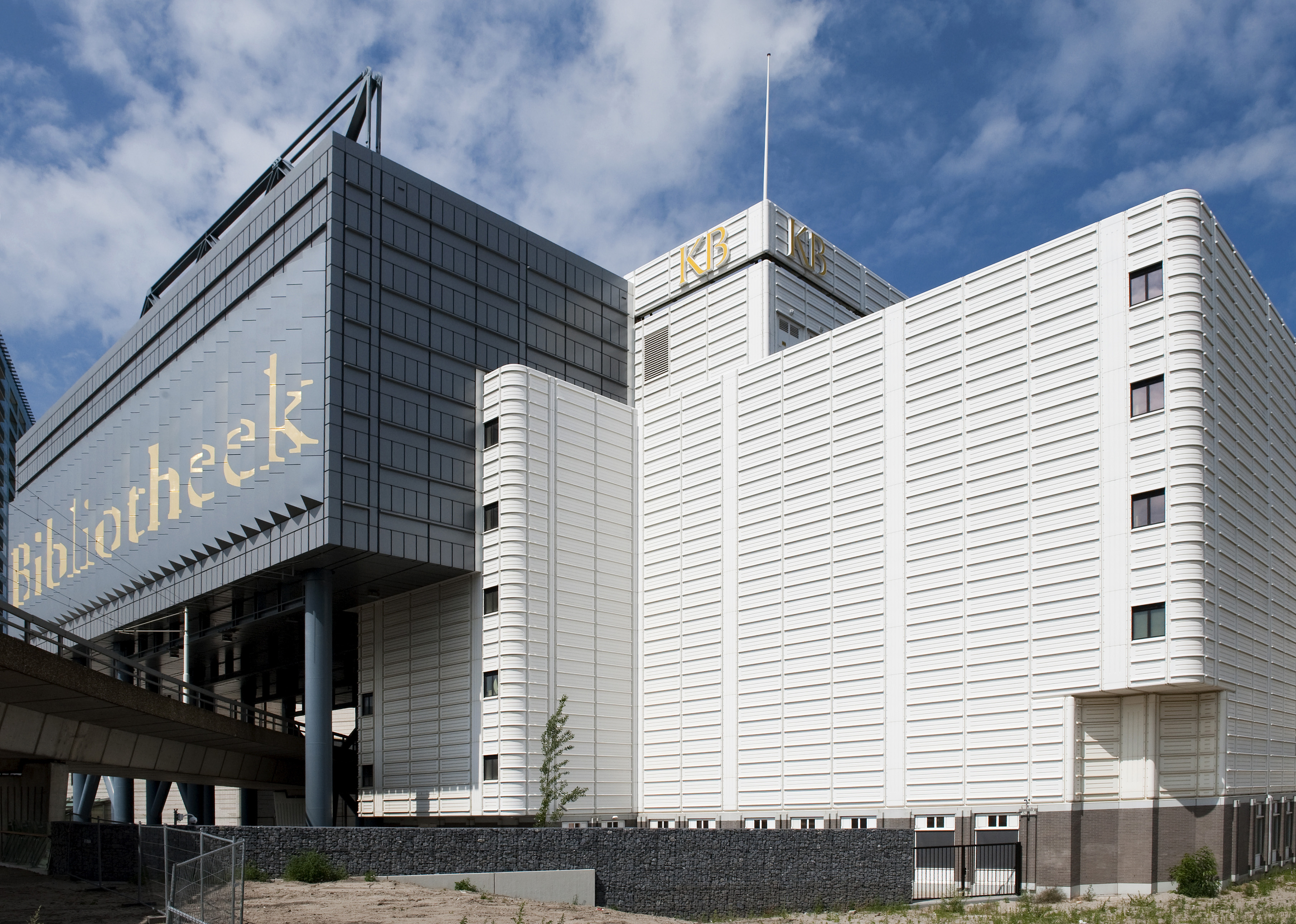
- The KB as seen from the Prins Bernhardviaduct
- 52°4′50.37″N 4°19′36.35″E
- Location: The Hague
- Type: National Library
- Established: 1798 (228 years ago)

Collection
- Size: 7 million printed items: over 115 km (71 mi) of books, newspapers, journals, and microforms

Access and use
- Members: 16,975

Other information
- Budget: €128 million (2023)
- Director: Wilma van Wezenbeek
- Employees: 481 FTE (2023)
- Website: www.kb.nl/en

The KB National Library of the Netherlands (legal Dutch name: Koninklijke Bibliotheek [ˈkoːnɪŋkləkə ˌbiblijoːˈteːk] 'Royal Library', or KB [kaːˈbeː]) is the national library of the Netherlands, based in The Hague, founded in 1798.

The KB collects everything that is published in and concerning the Netherlands, from medieval literature to today's publications. About 7 million publications are stored in the stockrooms, including books, newspapers, magazines and maps. The KB offers digital services, such as the national online Library (with e-books and audiobooks), Delpher (millions of digitised pages) and The Memory (about 800,000 images). Since 2015, the KB has played a coordinating role for the network of the public library. The KB's collection of websites as hosted by the former Dutch internet provider XS4ALL is on the Unesco documentary world heritage memory of the world. It is the first web collection in the world that has been granted this status.

== History ==
The initiative to found a national library was proposed by representative Albert Jan Verbeek on 17 August 1798. The collection would be based on the confiscated book collection of William V. The library was officially founded as the Nationale Bibliotheek (National Library) on November 8 of the same year, after a committee of representatives had advised the creation of a national library on the same day. The National Library was initially only open to members of the Representative Body.

King Louis Bonaparte gave the national library in 1806 the predicate 'Royal'. Napoleon Bonaparte transferred the Royal Library to The Hague as property, while also allowing the Imperial Library in Paris to expropriate publications from the Royal Library. In 1815, King William I of the Netherlands confirmed the name of 'Royal Library' (Dutch: Koninklijke Bibliotheek) by royal decree. It has been known as the National Library of the Netherlands since 1982, when it opened new quarters. The institution became 'Independent Administrative Body' of the state in 1996, although it is financed by the Department of Education, Culture and Science. On 18 November 2014 the Wsob (Public Library Facilities System Act or 'Library Act') came into being. The act became valid on 1 January 2015 and from this moment onwards four organisations from the library world continued under the name Koninklijke Bibliotheek. These organisations are Sector Institute Public Libraries (SIOB), the Foundation Bibliotheek.nl (BNL), the Digital Library for Dutch Literature (DBNL) and the Koninklijke Bibliotheek (KB). In 2020 the name was changed to 'KB, national library'.

== Assignments ==
The KB's main task is to acquire, catalogue, store and make available the printed (including the modern digital variants) heritage of the Netherlands and thus offer everyone in the Netherlands the opportunity to read, learn and research. It is also responsible for directing and coordinating the Public Library world according to the Public Library Facilities Act (WSOB). Together with the network of (public) libraries, the KB is building the national digital library.

== Collection ==
In the KB's older collections, the humanities were central, with an emphasis on Dutch history, language and culture. Since 1974, however, all publications in the field of exact and social sciences have also been collected within the framework of the Depot van Nederlandse Publicaties, 'Depository of Dutch Publications'.

In 2016, the KB contained 7,000,000 items, equivalent to 115 kilometres of bookshelves. Most items in the collection are books. There are also pieces of "grey literature", where the author, publisher, or date may not be apparent but the document has cultural or intellectual significance. The collection contains almost the entire literature of the Netherlands, from medieval manuscripts to modern scientific publications. As there was no mandatory law for depositing Dutch publications, the library started on 1 January 1974, the voluntary 'Depot van Nederlandse Publicaties' (Dutch Repository Library). This in contrast with most other countries that have a legal deposit of publications. For a publication to be accepted, it must be from a registered Dutch publisher.

The Royal Library of the Netherlands also has works of art and antiquities. One such piece of art is The Madonna with the Christ Child by the fifteenth-century French painter Jean Fouquet, who is regarded as one of the best painters from that era. A valuable antiquity that is housed within the library is a bound book by Christopher Plantin (1520–89), a sixteenth-century French printer and publisher. The binding is made of brown calfskin with gold tooling. The book was made at Plantin's workshop in Antwerp and was dedicated to Emperor Charles V (1500–58). The library also has remarkable eighteenth-century brocade paper from Augsburg, Germany. In addition, the library holds a rare elaborately illustrated book from 1596. The book is of the travels of Jan Huygen van Linschoten (1563–1611). He travelled to Spain, India, Indonesia, and East Asia. Another valuable antiquity is the oldest depiction of 'Dutchmen'. In 975, Count Dirk and Countess Hildegard donated the medieval manuscript, known as the Egmond Gospels, to Egmond Abbey. It is one of the oldest surviving church treasures and includes depictions of 'Dutch' people and buildings. The Egmond Gospels were lost around the sixteenth century, but were found in the early nineteenth century. Knowing its historical significance, the Dutch government purchased the manuscript and brought it to the Royal Library of the Netherlands. The Royal Library of the Netherlands also has the Trivulzio Book of Hours (ca. 1465), a medieval manuscript that measures 9 cm x 13 cm, and contains wonderfully detailed Flemish miniature art. One of the most precious atlases is the Atlas van der Hagen of 4 volumes, each containing something more than 100 maps and prints, created around 1690. All plates were coloured by hand and highlighted with gold by Dirk Jansz van Santen, a famous 'afzetter' (somebody who embellished prints, maps and book illustrations at a time when it was not yet possible to print in colour).

In 1871, the library bought the library of A. van der Linde, among others devoted to chess. Mixed with that of M. Niemeijer, acquired in 1948, the Biblioteca van der Linde-Niemeijeriana (approximately 40,000 items) forms one of the most important collections worldwide on this topic.

The collection is accessible for members. Any person aged 16 years or older can become a member. One-day passes are also available. Requests for material take approximately 30 minutes. The KB hosts several open access websites, including the "Memory of the Netherlands" (Geheugen van Nederland), Digital Library for Dutch Literature and Delpher, an archive of more than 100 million pages as of 2020. The KB also holds material related to the Fagel Collection.

== Depot van Nederlandse Publicaties (Depository of Dutch Publications) ==
The KB started a voluntary Deposit of Dutch Publications on 1 January 1974. In 1985, by decree of the Council of Ministers, government departments and institutions and institutions subsidised by the government were obliged to submit a free copy of their publications to the KB. The KB strives for a Dutch collection that is as complete as possible of books, magazines and geographical maps published in the Netherlands, written abroad by Dutch people or about the Netherlands. Sheet music (because the volume of publications per year was too large for processing within the Depository) and Braille books (so as not to unnecessarily withdraw copies from libraries for the blind) were excluded from the start. At first, local door-to-door newspapers were also included, but the acquisition was stopped in 1992. Title information of the publications is included in the Dutch National Bibliography. In 1976, the editorship of Brinkman's Cumulatieve Catalogus van Boeken ('Brinkman's Cumulative Catalogue of Books'; 1858–2001) was taken over from the private publisher Samsom-Sijthoff, giving it the status of national bibliography. The KB has been carrying out the Depositary Task since 1974 and thus manages part of the Dutch cultural heritage. In order to protect the interests of the copyright holders, the publications can only be consulted locally, unless the copyright holder consents to such online consultation.

== Short-Title Catalogue, Netherlands (STCN) ==
The Short-title catalogue, Netherlands is a service of the KB. It concerns a database of the Dutch retrospective bibliography up to 1800. The database contains (abridged) descriptions of all books that were published up to and including the year 1800 within the borders of the present-day Netherlands and of all books published in the Dutch language outside the Netherlands. The STCN is made on the basis of the collections of libraries in and outside the Netherlands. The size of the file is more than 200,000 titles in more than 500,000 copies (November 2013). The STCN was created in a project. The project was completed in 2009. The service is continued by the KB and the database is expanded daily.

== Literature museum ==
The Literature museum was founded in 1750 as Nederlands Letterkundig Museum, The museum contains a large collection of letters, manuscripts and memorabilia. The museum has three permanent and several temporary exhibitions. It also contains a special children's book museum. On 4 February 2016, an online museum was opened. On 1 November 2016, the museum was renamed to Literature museum. The museum has a reading room with an extensive collection of newspaper clipping, and under certain conditions, some archival material can be consulted.

== Special exhibitions ==
On the occasion of the bicentenary of the library in 1998, the exhibition Het worderbaarlijke alfabet ('The Miraculous Alphabet') was organised in the Nieuwe Kerk, Amsterdam and three books and a special 80 cent stamp were issued. In 2002, the next major exhibition Wonderland, from Pietje Bell to Harry Potter, especially for children, was held in the Kunsthal in Rotterdam, in which a selection was made from its collection of 125,000 children's books. Thanks to support from the VSB Cultural Fund, which took care of the transport of more than 40,000 school children between 8 and 12 years old from all over the Netherlands, this was a great success. When a new storeroom extension of the KB complex was taken into use in 2006, the exhibition Magazine! was organised. This was set up as a three-dimensional magazine in which the visitor literally walks around.

== Research ==
The KB's Research Department is engaged in research in the field of digital technology, sustainable preservation and accessibility of both paper and digital heritage. Important topics are the applicability of artificial intelligence, the use of big data, the increasing importance of privacy & security, the changes in the publishing and publishing world, and the role of public libraries in today's society.

== Nazi-looted art ==
In 2015, it was discovered that "View of the Kattenberghof in Antwerp with horsemen in the foreground" by Gillis Neyts (1618–1687) had belonged Dr. Arthur Feldmann, a Jewish art collector from Brno (Czech Republic) who was murdered in the Holocaust. In 2020 it was discovered that 'La buveuse d'absinthe', a watercolour by Félicien Rops from 1876 had belonged to the French collector, Armand Dorville.

== Accommodation ==
In 1973 the Rijksgebouwendienst ('Government Buildings Agency') awarded the contract to the architects A. Hagoort, P.B.M. van der Meer and A.J. Trotz from Bureau OD205 for a new building, construction of which began in 1977. Since 1982, the library has been housed in a modern building at the Prins Willem Alexanderhof in The Hague, next to The Hague Central Station. The entire complex comprises approx. 55,000 m^{2} net and approx. 78,000 m^{2} gross surface (gross content 305,000 m^{3}). The building, which is characterised by 5,200 white aluminium plates that clad the facades, with rounded corners and recessed facade surfaces, stands next to the Nationaal Archief. The building also houses the 'Literatuurmuseum' ('Literary Museum'), the Kinderboekenmuseum ('Children's Book Museum'), RKD and the offices of Europeana, DEN (Digital Heritage Netherlands) LIBER and IFLA. The CDNL secretariat is also housed in the KB building. The library was previously located in the former city palace Huis Huguetan on the Lange Voorhout (period 1821 to 1982), before that in the Mauritshuis (period 1807 to 1821) and a site at the Binnenhof (period 1798 to 1807).

== Gallery ==
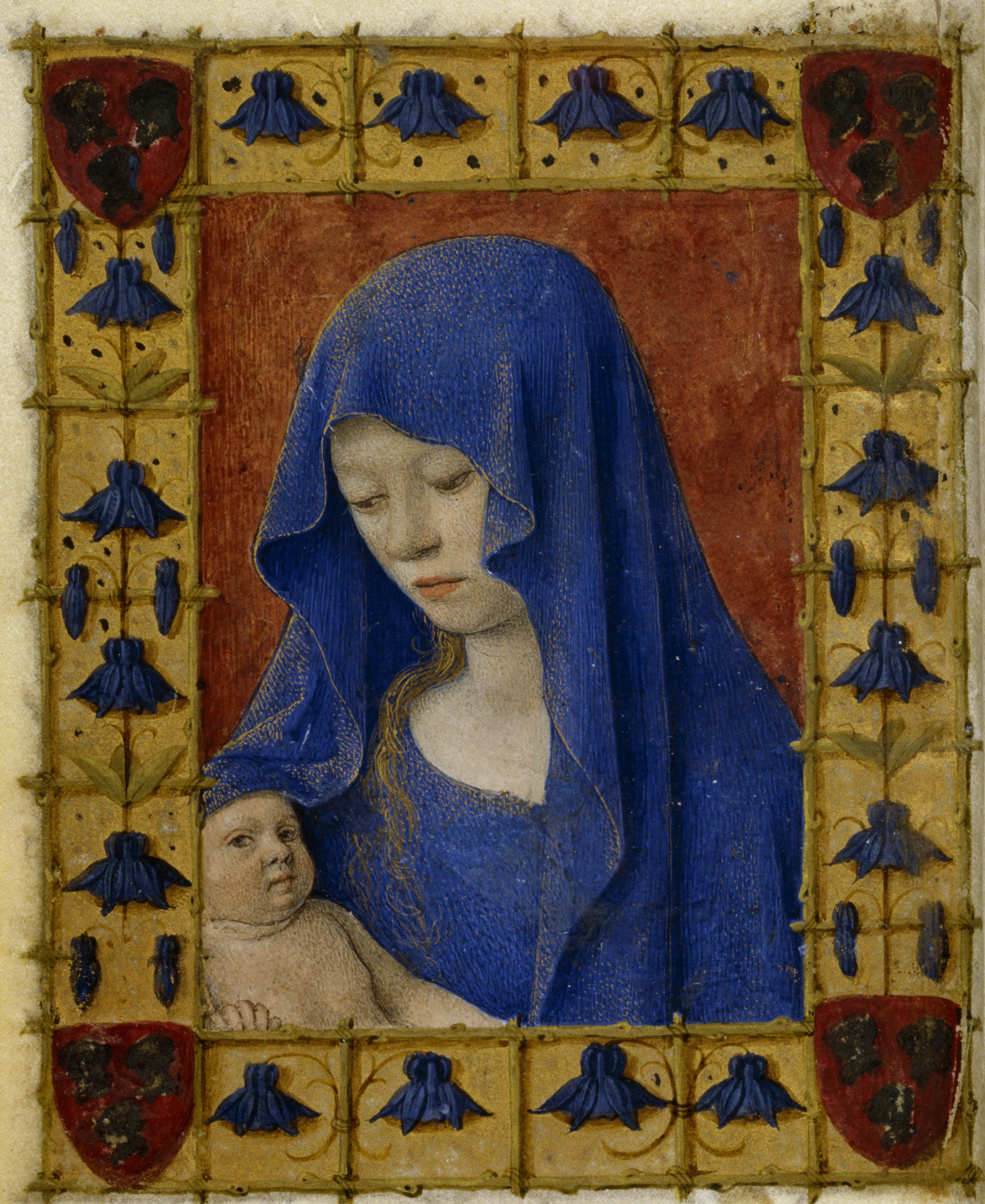
Mary holding the Christ-child - miniature from folio 001v from the Book of Hours of Simon de Varie - KB 74 G37a

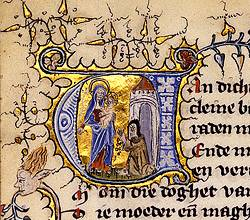
Illuminated initial at the beginning of the Beatrijs manuscript

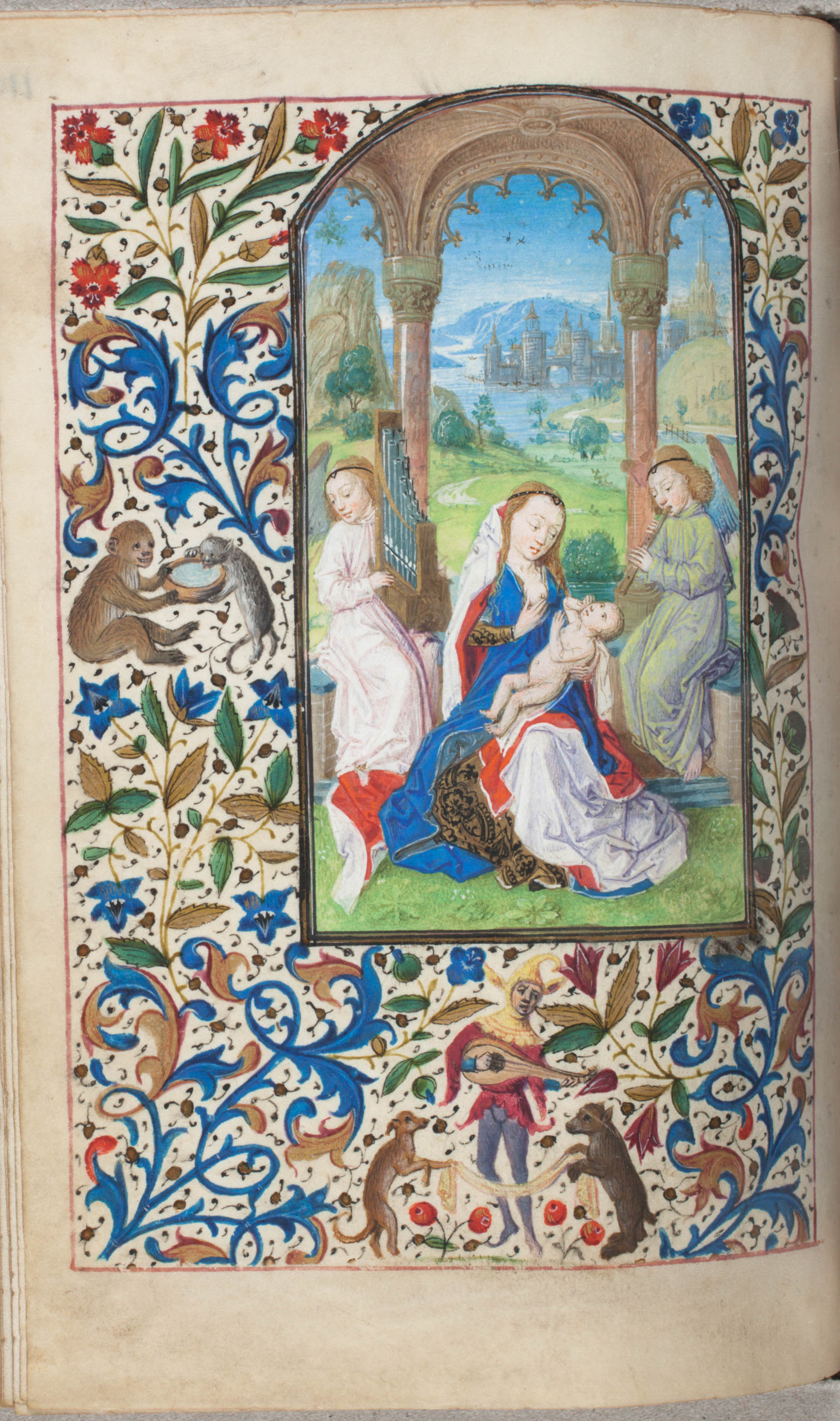
Trivulzio book of hours, folio 110v

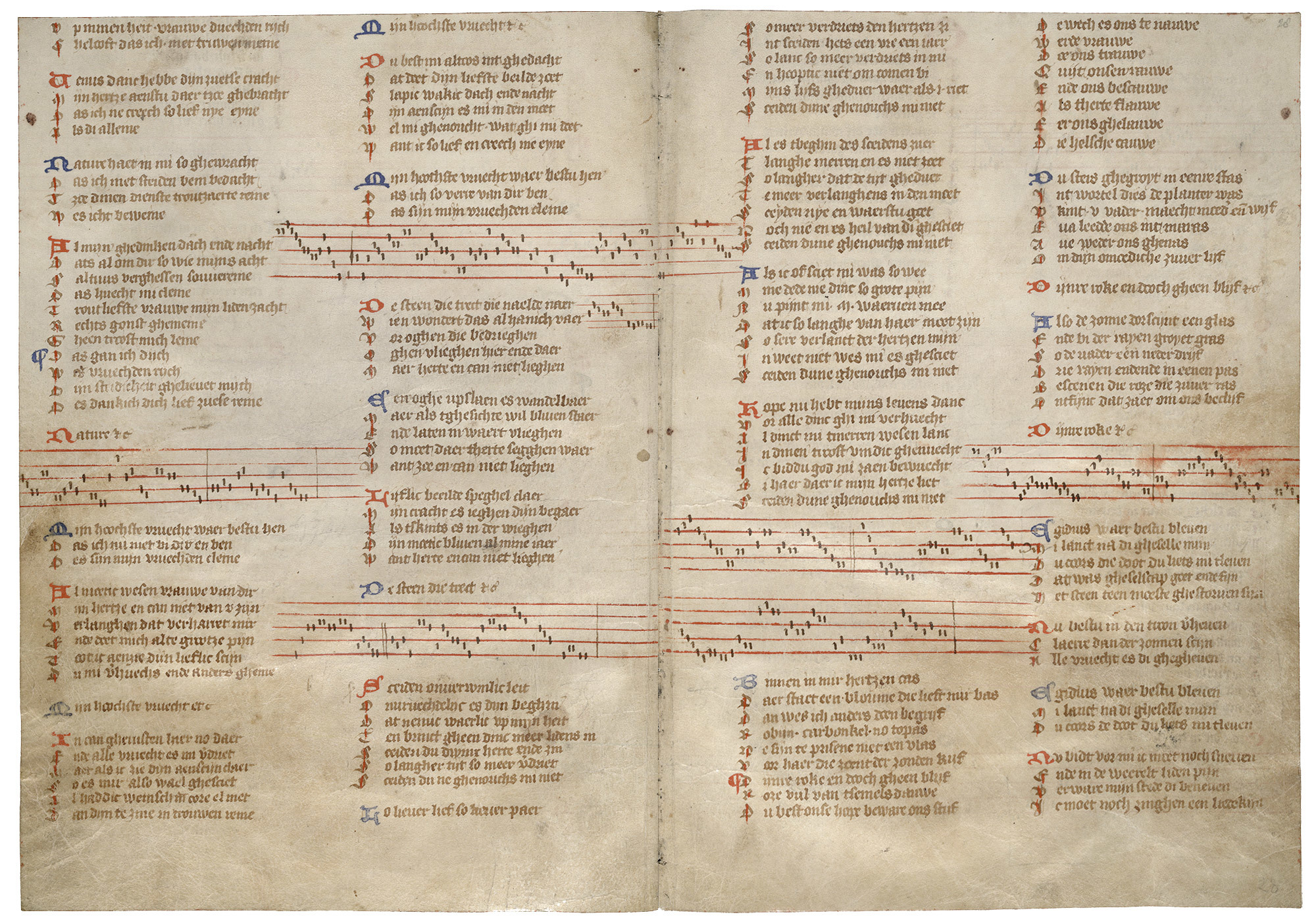
Gruuthuse manuscript, 27v-28r

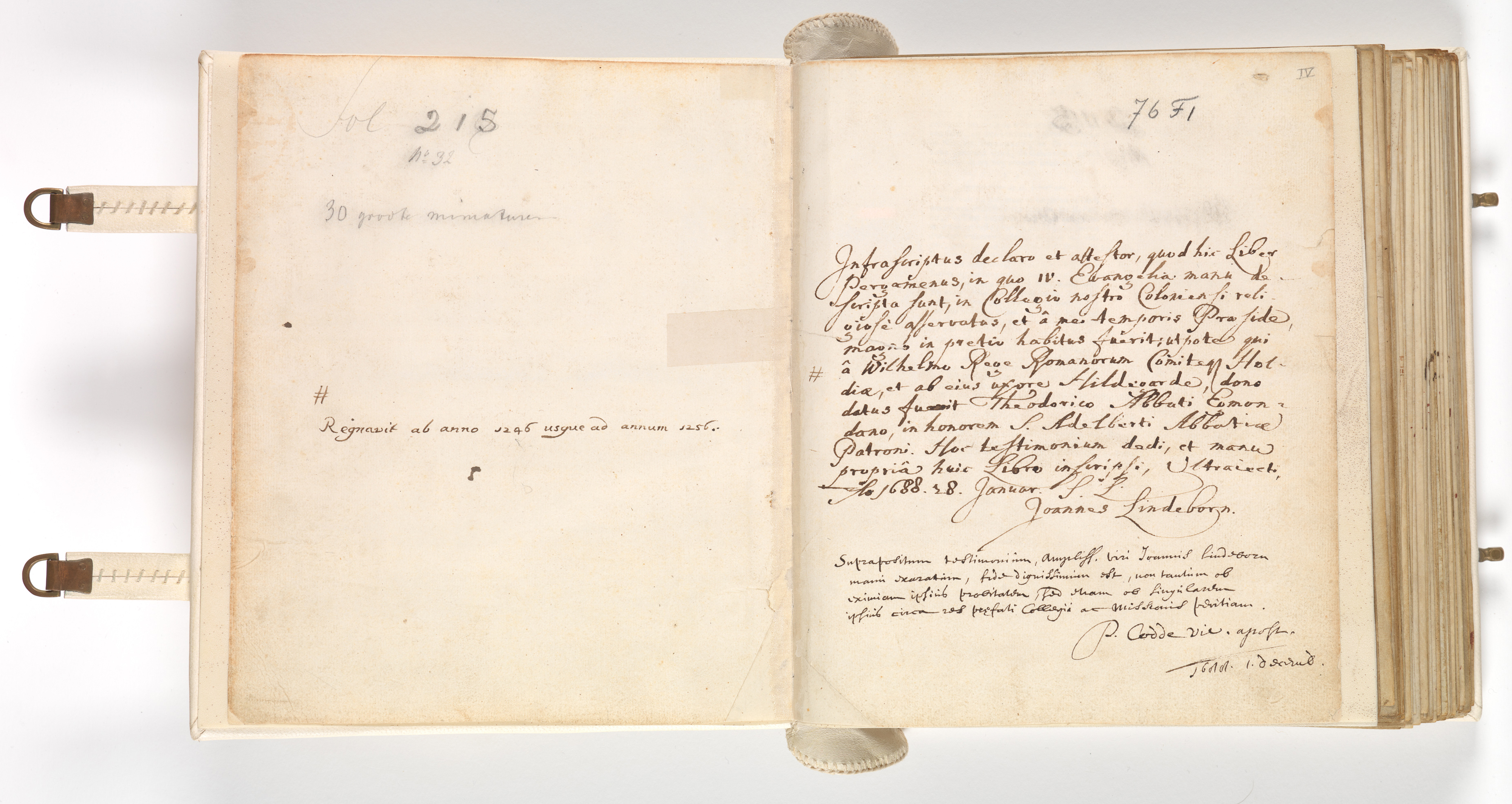
Evangeliarium of Egmond IIIv-IVr

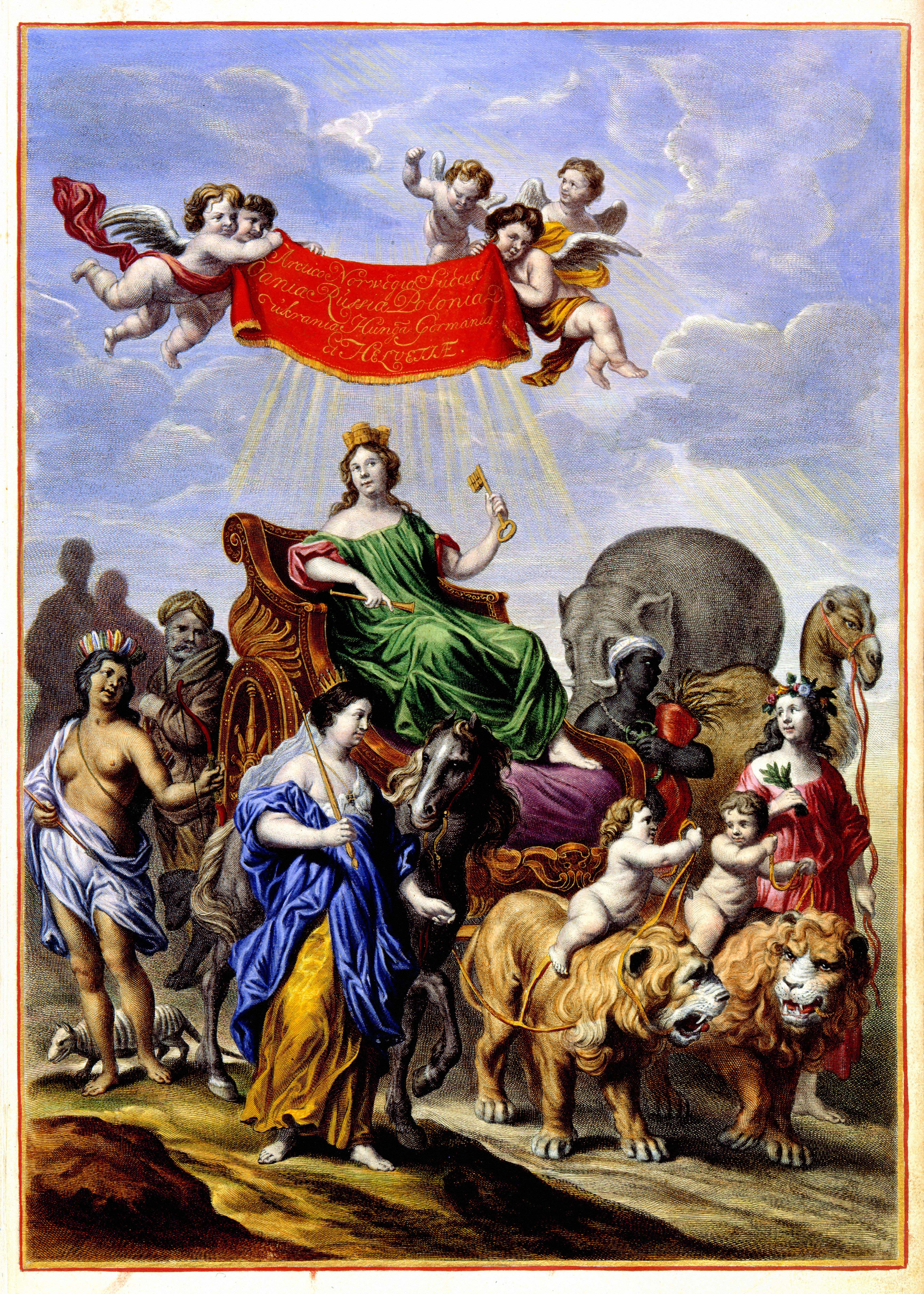
One of the four title prints of the Atlas van der Hagen. This one is from the part: Arctico Norwegio Succia Dania Russia Polonia Ukraniae Hung: a Germania.
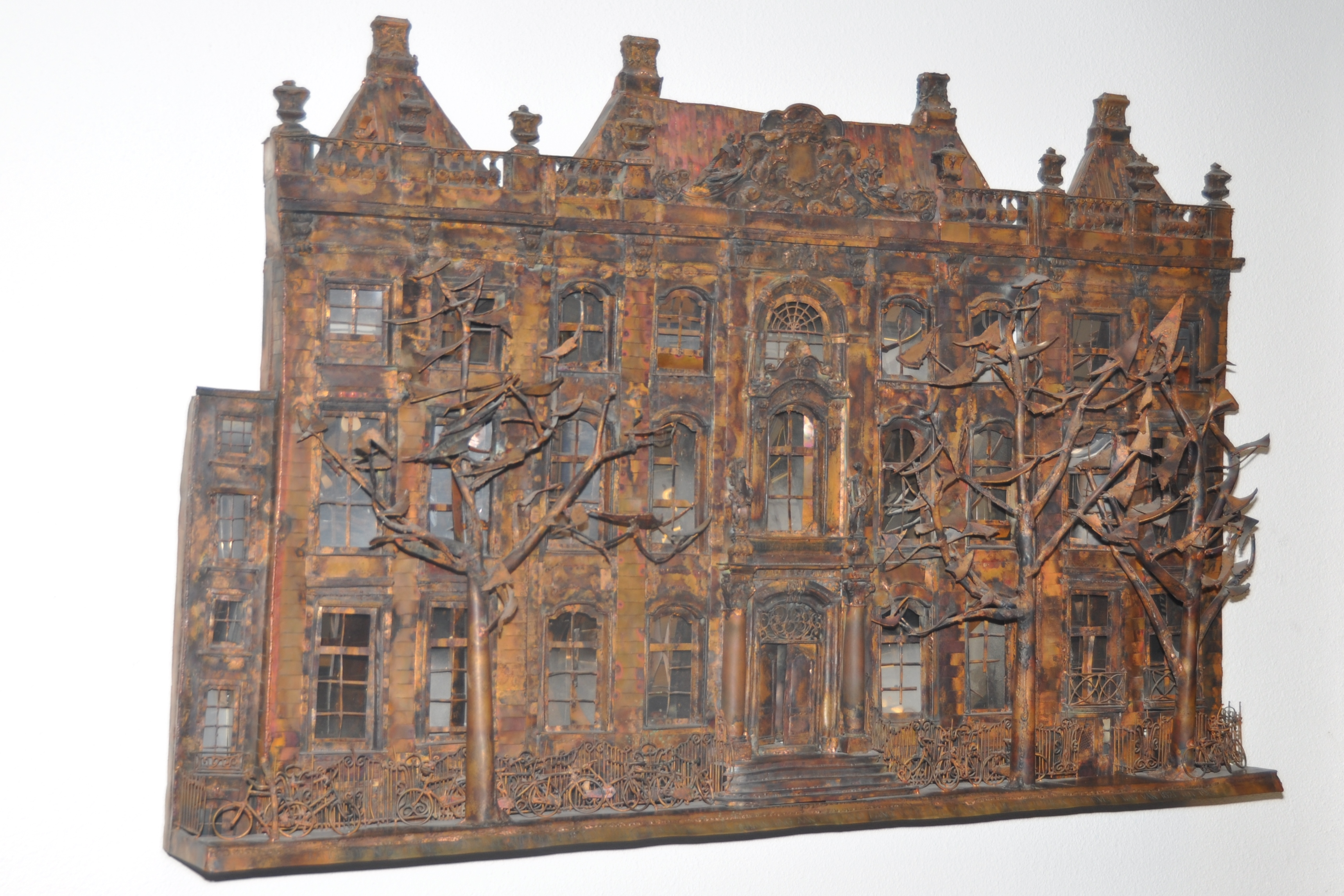
Sculpture of the former front of the Royal Library on the Lange Voorhout, 1821–1982, in the reading room of the present building.

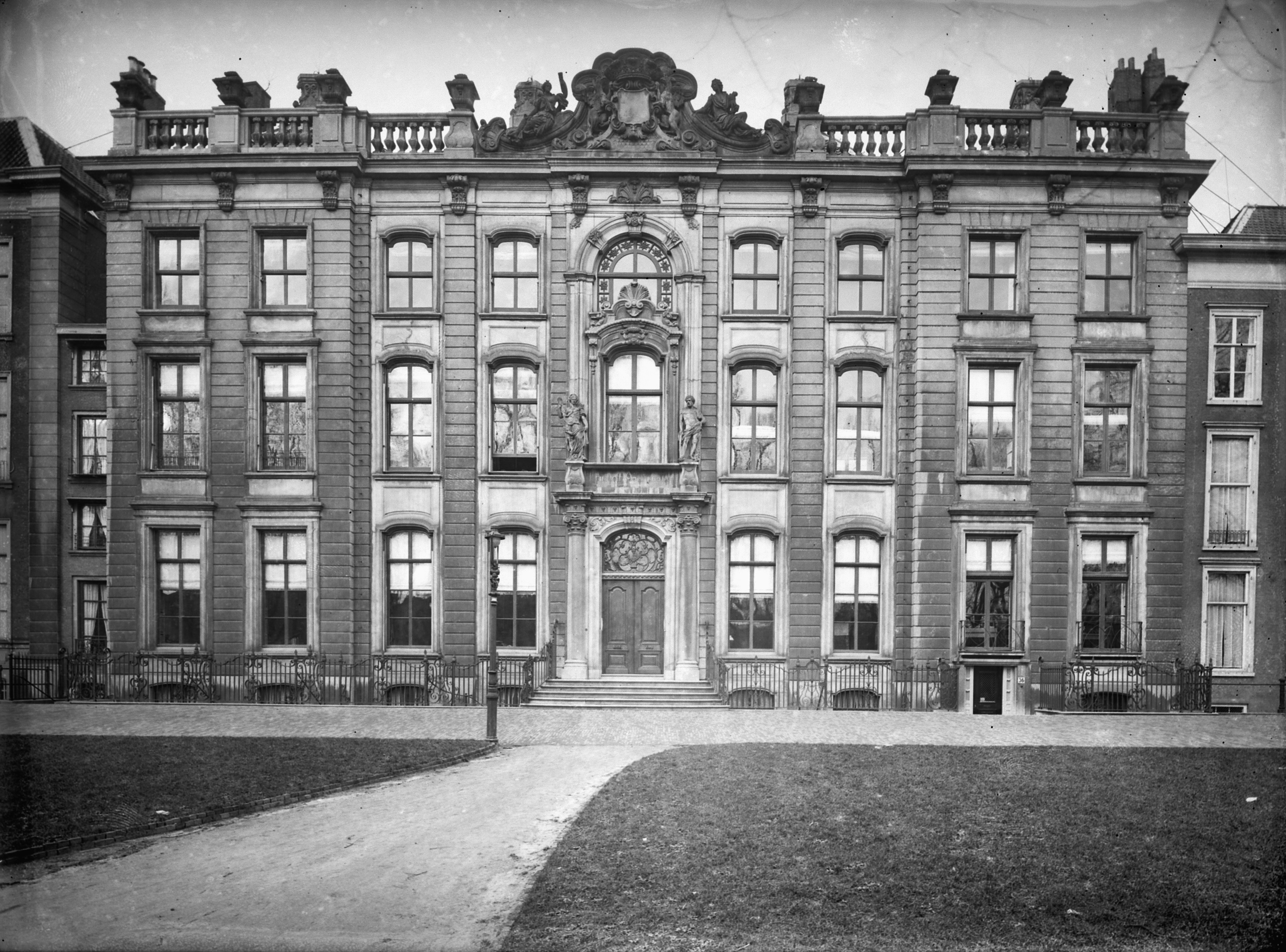
Front of the KB at Lange Voorhout, January 1925

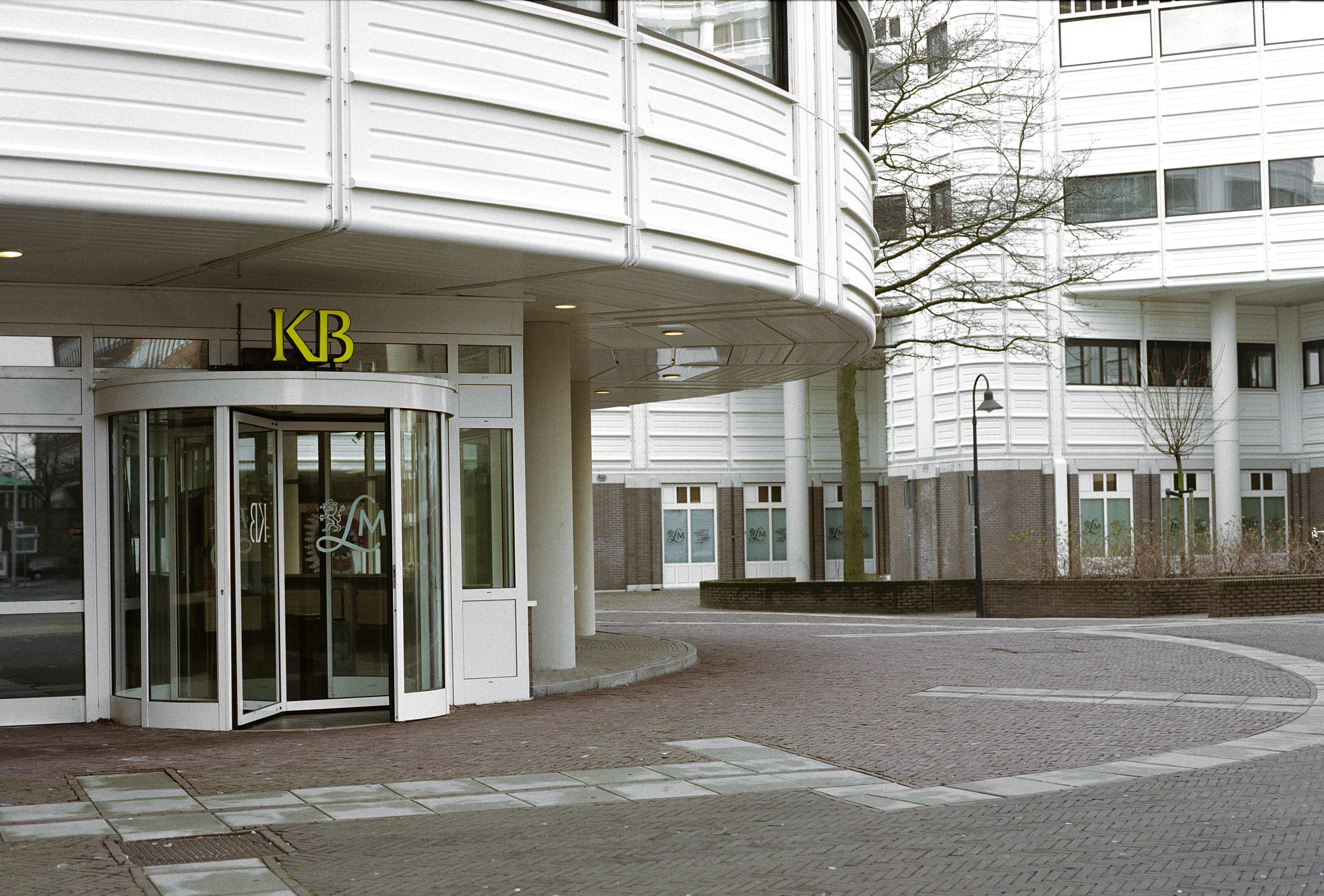
Main entrance KB, 2007

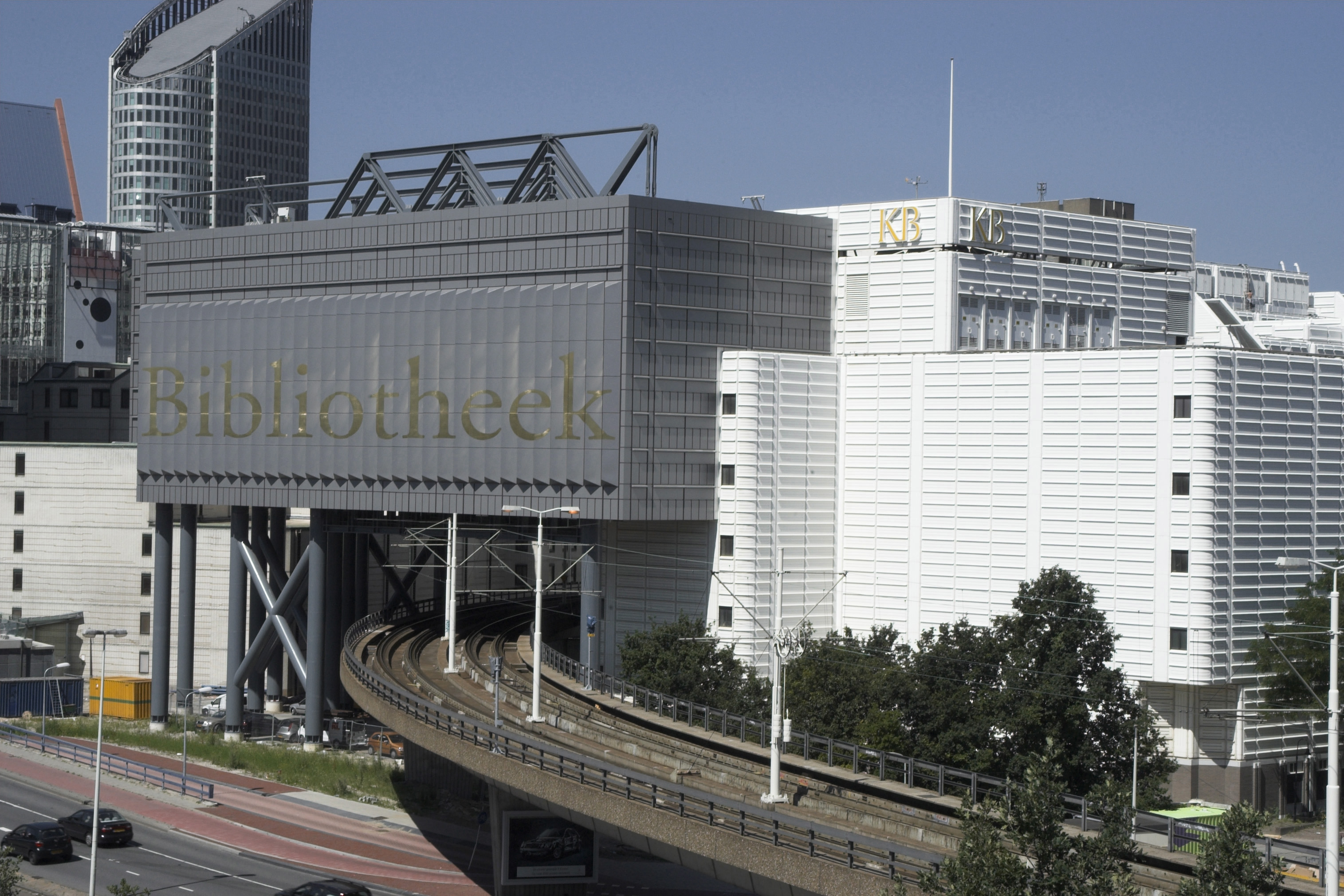
Rear and store rooms KB, 2009

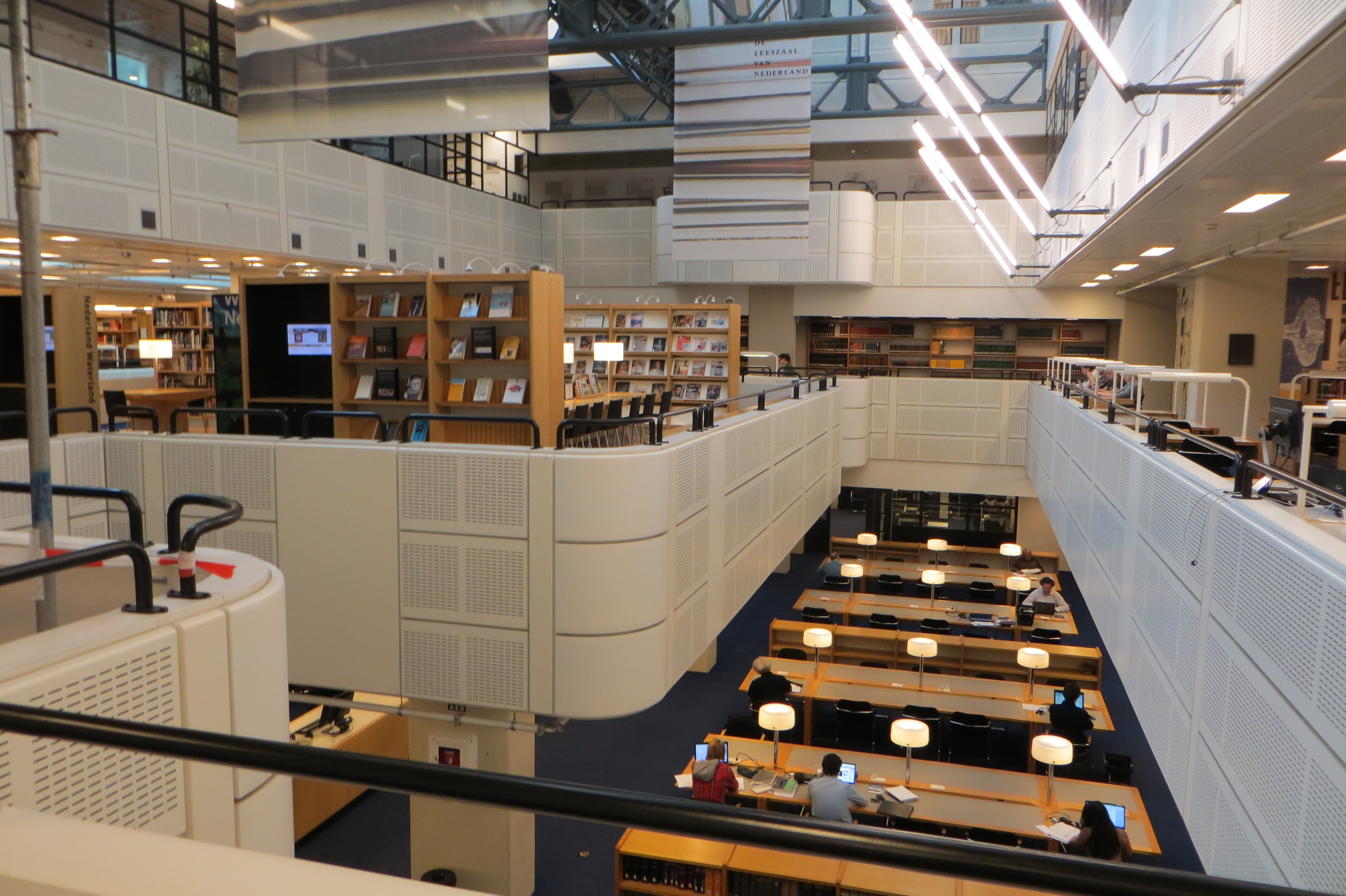
Reading room KB, 2015

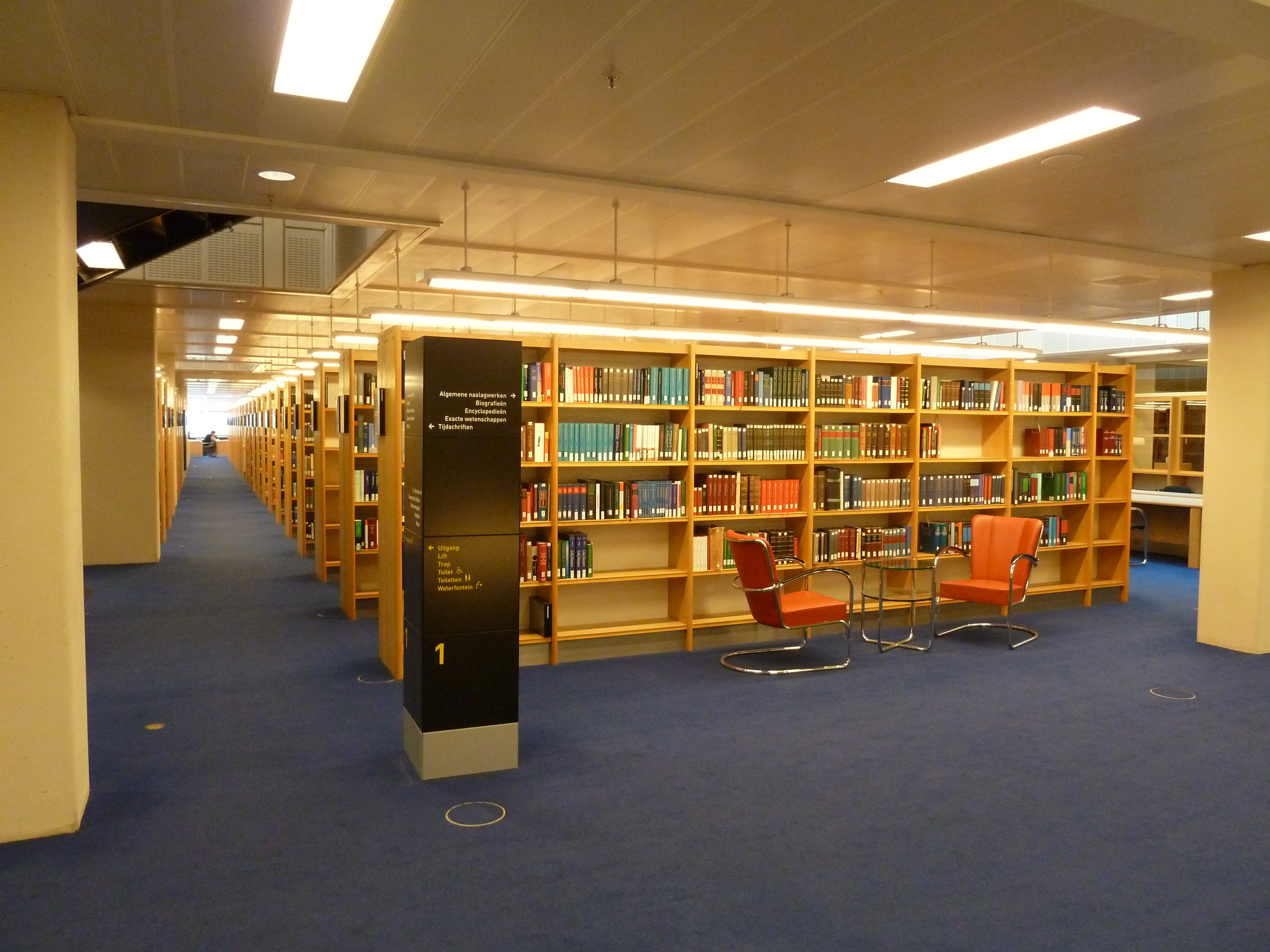
Reading room KB, 2013

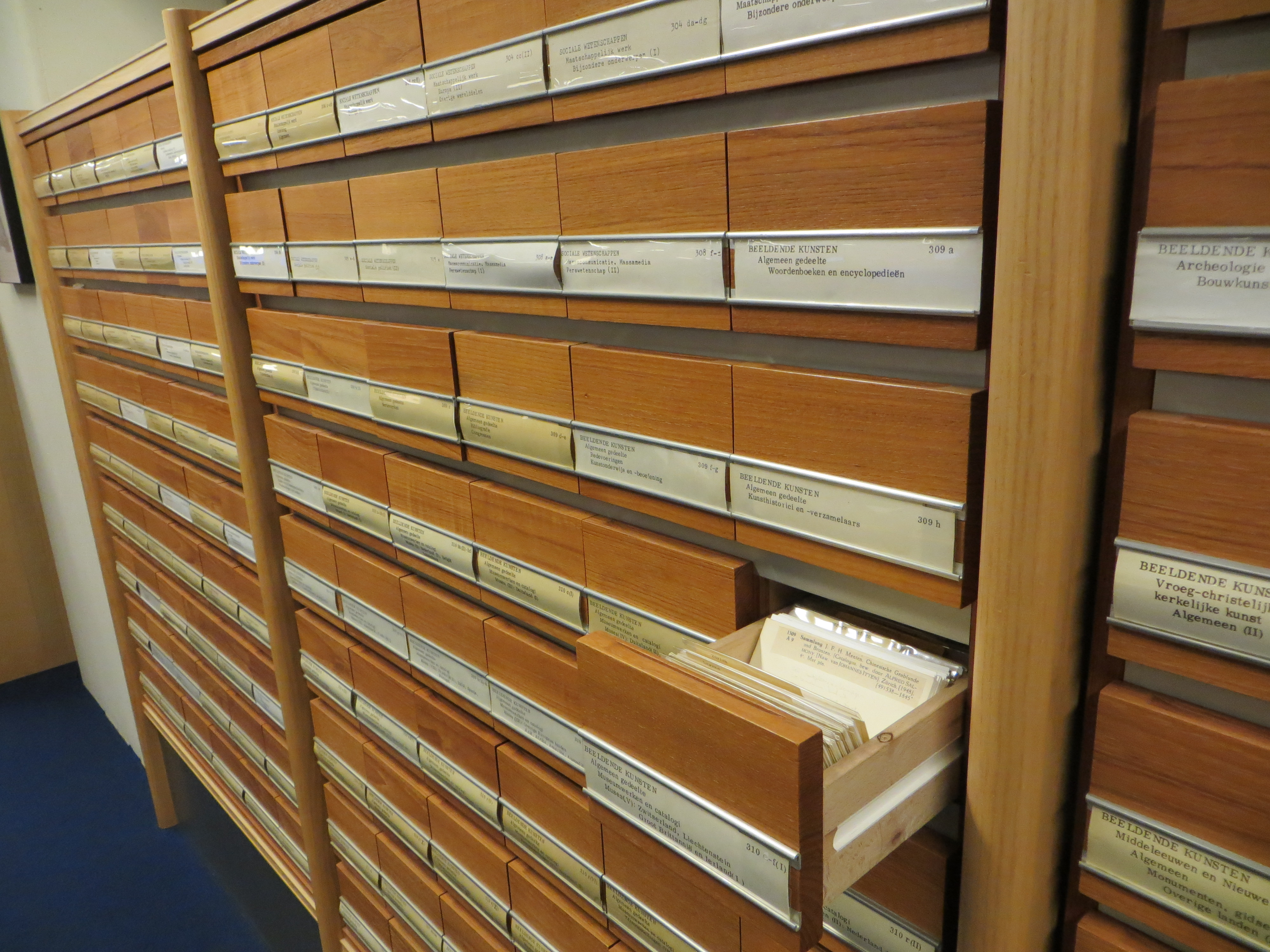
Old catalogue KB, 2015

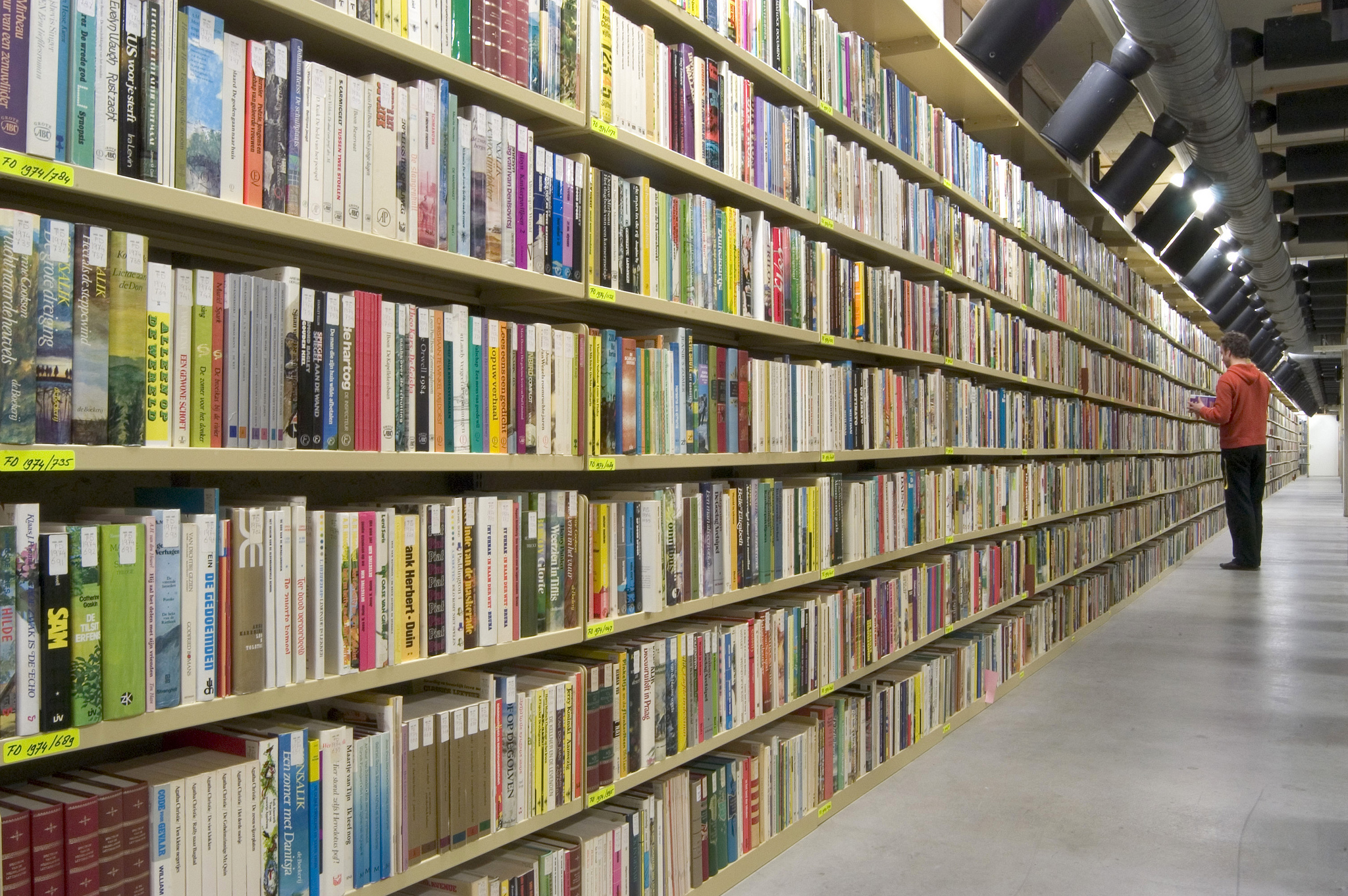
Store rooms KB, 2009

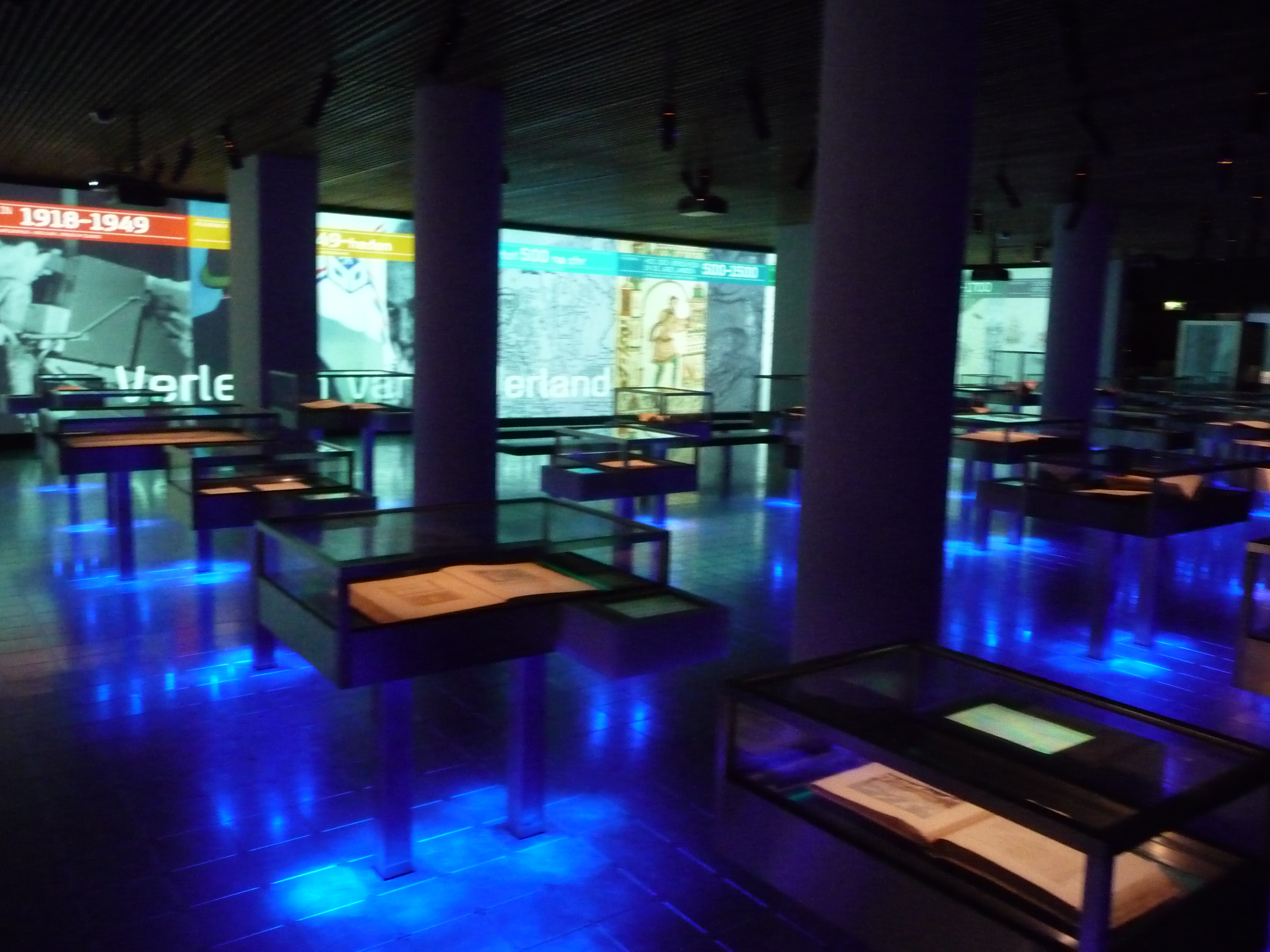
Exhibition room Masterpieces KB, 2008

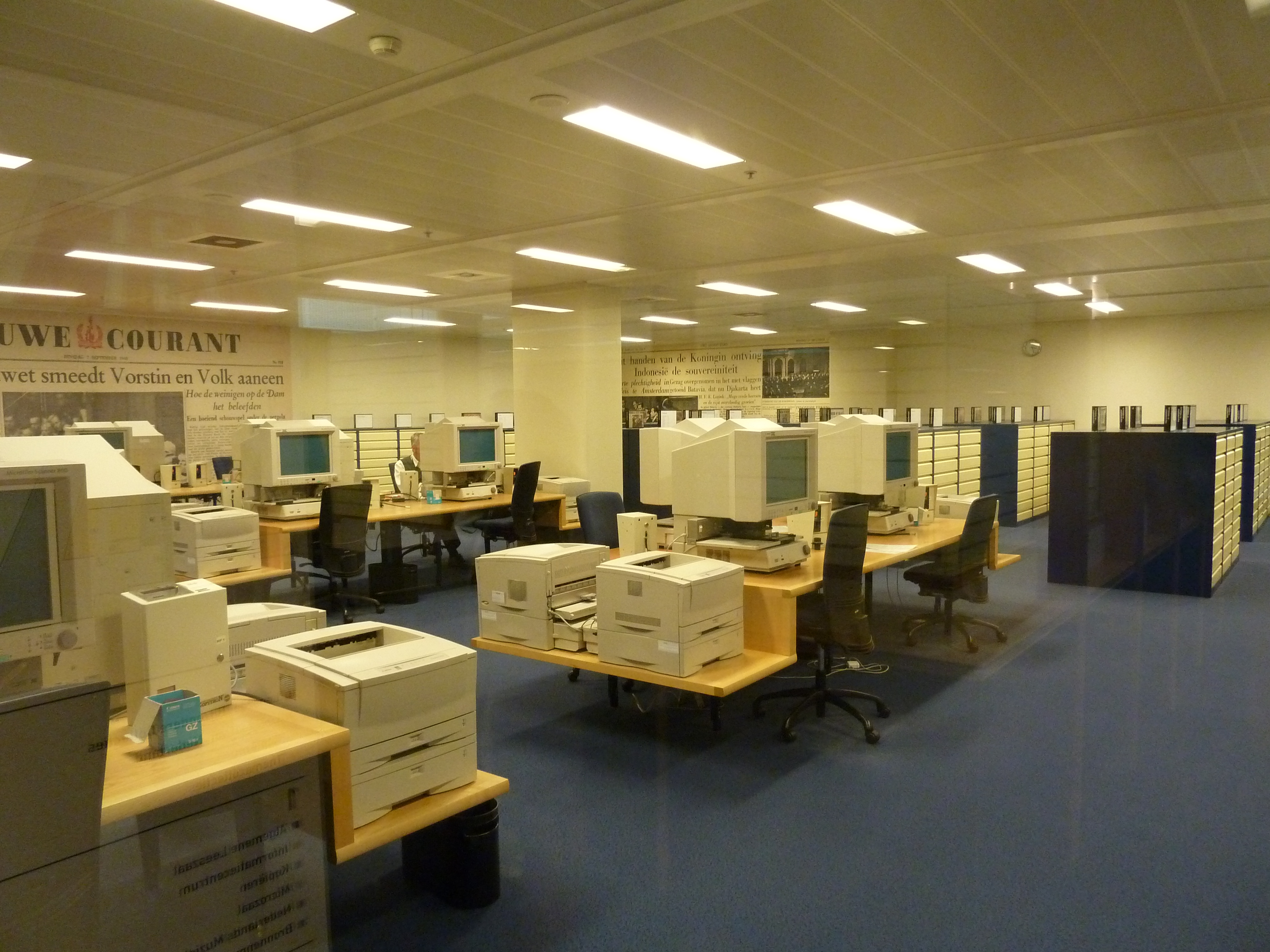
Microfiche and microfilm room KB, 2013

== See also ==
- Books in the Netherlands
- European Library
- List of libraries in the Netherlands
- Nederlandse Centrale Catalogus (Dutch Central Catalogue)
