= Philip A. Kuhn =

American historian and sinologist

Philip Alden Kuhn
- Born: September 9, 1933; London, England
- Died: February 11, 2016 (aged 82)
- Other names: simplified Chinese: 孔飞力 or 孔复礼; traditional Chinese: 孔飛力 or 孔復禮; pinyin: Kǒng Fēilì
- Citizenship: American
- Children: Anthony Kuhn

Academic background
- Education: Harvard University (BA, PhD); Georgetown University (MA)
- Doctoral advisor: John King Fairbank, Benjamin I. Schwartz

Academic work
- Discipline: History; Sinology
- Sub-discipline: Qing dynasty history Overseas Chinese history
- Institutions: University of Chicago; Harvard University
- Doctoral students: Timothy Brook, Timothy Cheek, Prasenjit Duara, William C. Kirby, Daniel Overmyer, Hans van de Ven, Arthur Waldron

Philip A. Kuhn (September 9, 1933 – February 11, 2016) was an American historian of China and the Francis Lee Higginson Professor of History and of East Asian Languages and Civilizations at Harvard University.

Kuhn was praised by his colleagues. Frederic Wakeman described Kuhn as "one of the West's premier China historians." Stanford University historian Harold L. Kahn added that “Every twenty years, like clockwork, Philip Kuhn produces a book that we are required to read. What he says sticks to the ribs and gives much pleasure,” and Yale University historian Peter Perdue wrote that Kuhn "shaped the field of Qing history more profoundly than any other scholar of his generation."

== Personal life ==
Kuhn was born on September 9, 1933, in London. He was the elder son of Ferdinand and Delia Kuhn, to whom he dedicated his first book. His father had been bureau chief of the London Office of the New York Times and later served at the Washington Post. His mother was a writer who served as information director of the Office of Community War Services during World War II.

Kuhn attended Woodrow Wilson High School and then received his A.B. from Harvard College.

In 1954, Kuhn studied Japanese and Japanese history at the School of Oriental and African Studies at the University of London. He enlisted in the United States Army, serving from 1955 to 1958. During this period, he studied Chinese and Chinese characters at the Defense Language Institute in California.

1958, Kuhn received his M.A. from Georgetown University, and 1959, Ph.D. in History and East Asian Languages at Harvard University, where his dissertation advisor was John K. Fairbank. He married Sally Cheng (程吾) in the 1960s and had one son, Anthony Kuhn, a journalist.

That marriage dissolved in 1980. He also had a daughter, Deborah W. Kuhn, with his second wife Mary L. Smith.

== Academic career ==
Kuhn taught at the University of Chicago from 1963 to 1978 where he attained the rank of Associate Professor in the Department of History. While at Chicago, Kuhn published in 1970 Rebellion and its Enemies in Late Imperial China: Militarization and Social Structure, 1796-1864 as part of the Harvard East Asian monograph series, which led to his being granted tenure and a full professorship.

In 1978 Kuhn returned to Harvard, where he succeeded his mentor John King Fairbank. From 1980 to 1986, Kuhn served as director of the Fairbank Center for Chinese Studies.

== Impact and evaluations ==
A pioneer of social history in Chinese history, Kuhn helped re-evaluate the "impact-response" school of Western scholarship on China associated with his mentor, John Fairbank. Gong Yongmei, a researcher at the Center for China Studies Abroad at East China Normal University, observed that in his early work, Kuhn followed in the steps of his mentors, Fairbank and Benjamin I. Schwartz, but where they saw the modern history of China as a story of decline and stagnation, he stressed the new social and political forms that were created internally, not imported from the west, and that progressed toward modernization. That is, he did not favor either the traditional Chinese framework of the dynastic cycle or the Cold War American framework of Western impact and China's response. Kuhn's dissertation research started with local militarization that put power in the hands of local gentry at the expense of the central government.

This doctoral research resulted in book-length chapters on the Taiping Rebellion in the Cambridge History of China, and his initial book, Rebellion and Its Enemies in Late Imperial China; Militarization and Social Structure, 1796-1864, published by Harvard University Press in 1970. In his influential analysis of American historians of China, Paul A. Cohen says that Rebellion and Its Enemies is a "landmark study" which begins to modify the line of interpretation which sees China's modernization as brought from outside China and outside Chinese tradition and that Kuhn "instead addresses the nature of change taking place before the coming of the West." His question is not response to Western imperialism but "what was happening in eighteenth century China?"

When the Beijing archives of the Qing dynasty became open to American scholars, Kuhn was among the first to spend extended time exploring them. His second monograph, Soulstealers: The Chinese Sorcery Scare of 1768 (1990) was centered on an incident of alleged shamanic witchcraft – “soul stealing” – that took place in the spring of 1768. Reports reached the Qianlong Emperor that wandering sorcerers were stealing the souls of children, laborers, fishmongers, landlords, and the wives of grain transporters by cutting their queues or lapels, igniting panic in the countryside. Outsiders who were suspected of this witchcraft were arrested and tortured, and some were lynched. When skeptical mid-level or provincial bureaucrats initially resisted this local response because they regarded local beliefs as superstitious, the emperor threatened them with punishment or even death if they didn’t find the alleged sorcerers and eradicate this menace to his imperial order. Kuhn uses detailed reports filed by officials at all levels to describe local society and bureaucratic tensions between local, mid-level and central bureaucrats in response to the emperor's paranoid demands. Kuhn shows how the Qing bureaucracy worked in order to shed light on the theoretical question first posed by Max Weber on the nature of political power in China.

Stanford University historian Harold L. Kahn's review in Journal of Asian Studies said that Kuhn's "mastery of (and profound affection for) archival documents-confessions, trial records, court letters, secret (and not-so-secret) memorials, above all the vermillion rescripts of the emperor- and his anthropological rummaging in law codes and ritual permit us to follow him into local ecologies of uncertainty in an age of affluence, into an understanding of the fragile, busy, often embattled inner life of the popular soul, into the insecurities of Manchu ethnic sensibility and imperial loathing of the south and its soft blandishments.” Kuhn “constructs a social history of contagion at one level, an operational history of power at another, and then watches with benign irony as the subjects of both intersect at ever-ascending levels of victimization.”

The book's central theme is the relation between the power of the monarch and the restraining power of the bureaucracy. Pamela Kyle Crossley calls it “certainly one of the most thoughtful, and may well be one of the last, ruminations on the implications of Weberian concepts for studies of the Chinese state.” Kuhn sees the emperorship “locked in uneasy partnership with the bureaucracy,” resisting Weber's characterization of Chinese monarchy as a “genuinely autocratic institution,” and argues that the monarchy was able to reposition itself against the bureaucracy until it permanently lost this advantage in the 19th century. Kahn comments that the book shows autocratic power and bureaucratic complacency “fed on each other” and so “reinforced the sinews of the ancien regime,” a position that ran counter to Weber’s notion of mutual incompatibility in a zero-sum battle for power.

Jonathan Spence's review in Harvard Journal of Asiatic Studies also praises Kuhn for drawing attention to the often neglected role of shamanism and sorcery in late imperial China. He lauded Kuhn's treatment of hair and magic, especially in the thinking of the Manchu emperors, making the stealing of the queue an especially sensitive issue.

The Chinese translation of Soulstealers sold more than 100,000 copies. Some readers saw contemporary relevance. One of the book's translators, a history professor at East China Normal University, wrote in a postscript to the 2011 edition that the mass hysteria described in the book has often recurred in China, and that this hysteria "reached a peak in the 1960s and 1970s in the unprecedented Great Revolution." One online discussion drew 10,000 comments. One wrote "On the rare occasions when a rebellion was successful, that success merely produced another imperial court," and quoted Kuhn's book as an explanation: "Because the empowerment of ordinary people remains, even now, an unmet promise."

Kuhn's last book, Chinese among Others: Emigration in Modern Times (2008) is a comprehensive study of the Chinese diaspora, that is, the historic movement of Chinese out of China. Gong Yongmei notes that a "distinctive feature of Philip Kuhn’s scholarship is the importance of interpreting history from a theoretical paradigm..., a characteristic typical of American Chinese studies. In general, advanced theory and interpretative models are two remarkable advantages of American Chinese studies, and these are reflected in the analytical tools Kuhn draws on and the disciplines he borrows from in his research on Chinese immigrants: historical ecology, anthropology, sociology and religious studies.

Kuhn's students hold professorships at universities in Asia, North America, and Europe, among them: Cynthia Brokaw, Professor of History, Brown University; Timothy Brook, the Principal of St. John's College at University of British Columbia; Timothy Cheek, Louis Cha Chair in Chinese Research and Director, Centre for Chinese Research at University of British Columbia; Prasenjit Duara, Duke University; Karl Gerth, Professor of History and Hwei-Chih and Julia Hsiu Endowed Chair in Chinese Studies at UC San Diego; William C. Kirby, former Dean, Harvard Faculty of Arts and Sciences; Li Hsiao-t'i, Head of the Department of Chinese and History, City University of Hong Kong, Man-houng Lin, first female president of Academia Historica and Senior Research Fellow at the Institute of Modern History, Academia Sinica; Hans van de Ven, head of the Faculty of Asian and Middle Eastern Studies, University of Cambridge.

== Selected works ==
In a statistical overview derived from writings by and about Philip Kuhn, OCLC/WorldCat encompasses roughly 30+ works in 90+ publications in 7 languages and 2,900+ library holdings. Kuhn published numerous articles and five books, as well as chapters in Cambridge History of China.

- edited, Chinese Local Institutions, The Center for Chinese Studies Select Papers Volume I (pdf., EPUB, Kindle online
- —— (1970). Rebellion and Its Enemies in Late Imperial China; Militarization and Social Structure, 1796-1864. Cambridge, Mass.: Harvard University Press. ISBN 0674749510. , Chinese: 中华帝国晚期的叛乱及其敌人: 1796-1864年的军事化与社会結构)
- ——; Mann, Susan (1978), "Dynastic Decline and the Roots of Rebellion", in Fairbank, John King (ed.), Cambridge History of China, vol. 10, Cambridge; New York: Cambridge University Press, pp. 107–162
- —— (1978), "The Taiping Rebellion", in Fairbank, John K. (ed.), Cambridge History of China, vol. 10, Cambridge: Cambridge Univ Press, pp. 264–350
- Introduction to Chʻing Documents (Cambridge, MA: East Asian Research Center, Harvard University, 1986) A study guide and handbook used to train Chinese historians to read documents from China's late imperial period. (With John K. Fairbank)
- '—— (1990). Soulstealers: The Chinese Sorcery Scare of 1768. Cambridge, MA: Harvard University Press. ISBN 0674821513.. Winner of the 1990 Joseph Levenson Prize of the Association for Asian Studies，Chinese：叫魂：1768年中国妖术大恐慌
- National Polity and Local Power: The Transformation of Late Imperial China (1990), with Timothy Brook and Min Tu-ki
- "The Homeland: Thinking About the History of Chinese Overseas" The Fifty-eighth George Ernest Morrison Lecture in Ethnology 1997.
- —— (2002). Origins of the Modern Chinese State. Stanford, CA: Stanford University Press. ISBN 0804742839. Translated from a series of lectures given in Paris. Chinese Version (2013):《中国现代国家的起源》三联书店. ISBN 9787108045775
- —— (2006), "Why China Historians Should Study the Chinese Diaspora, and Vice-versa", Journal of Chinese Overseas, 20 (2): 163–172, doi:10.1163/179325406788639624. The Liu Kuang-ching Lecture, 2004. Delivered at the University of California, Davis.
- —— (2008). Chinese among Others: Emigration in Modern Times. Lanham: Rowman & Littlefield Publishers. ISBN 9780742510708.Chinese version (2016): 《他者中的华人：中国近现代移民史》. 江苏人民出版社. ISBN 9787214173881
