= CBDB =

CBDB may refer to:

- China Biographical Database (CBDB), a joint project of Harvard University, Peking University, and Academic Sinica
- CBDB (band), an American Band from Tuscaloosa, AL
- CBDB (AM), a radio rebroadcaster (990 AM) licensed to Watson Lake, Yukon, Canada, rebroadcasting CFWH

== See also ==
- Comic Book Database
