= Prosopographical network =

Humanities historical research model

A prosopographical network is a system which represents a historical group made up by individual actors and their interactions within a delimited spatial and temporal range. The network science methodology offers an alternative way of analyzing the patterns of relationships, composition and activities of people studied in their own historical context. Since prosopography examines the whole of a past society, its individuals who made it up, and its structure, this independent science of social history uses a collective study of biographies of a well-defined group, in a multiple career analysis, for collecting and interpreting relevant quantities of data, these same set of data can be employed for constructing a network of the studied group. Prosopographical network studies have emerged as a young and dynamic field in historical research; nevertheless, the category of prosopographical network is in its formative, initial phase and as a consequence it is hard to view as a stable and defined notion in history and beyond social network analysis. See also narrative network.

== Overview ==
With the advent of the study of complex systems, graph theory provides analysts of historical groups and collective lives with relatively simple tools for answering questions such as: how many degrees of separation on average separate all members of the prosopographical group? Which historical character is connected to the most other members of the studied range? How densely or loosely connected was the group as a whole? Such questions hold a natural interest for prosopographers, who can then begin to look for certain characteristics –class, office, occupation, gender, faction, ethnic background – and identify patterns of connectivity that they might have otherwise missed when confronted with a mass of data too large for normal synthetic approaches. The concepts and methods of social network analysis in historical research are recently being used not only as a mere metaphor but are increasingly applied in practice

== Background ==
The analysis and interpretation of prosopographical networks is an interdisciplinary field of study in social studies and humanities. This field emerged from philology, history, genealogical studies, and sociology and social network analysis. The term "prosopography" comes from the word prosopoeia, a figure in classical rhetoric in which an imagined person is figured and represented as if present. Claude Nicolet defined the main of prosopography as the history of groups as elements in political and social history, achieved by isolating series of persons having certain political or social characteristics in common and then analyzing each series in terms of multiple criteria, in order both to obtain information specific to individuals and to identify the constants and the variables among the data for whole groups.

According to British historian Lawrence Stone, prosopography had become a two-fold tool for historical research: 1) it helps to unveil interests and connections hidden or unclear in the narrative (i.e. rhetoric, historiography, etc.), and 2) it allows analysing the shifting roles in a community and the changing composition of society though genealogy, legal-institutional position, and inter-personal relations. For both uses, understanding connections and studying the evolution of a group, network analysis presents a helpful and feasible methodological framework for measuring quantities and interpreting data. By applying the methods of social network analysis, the approaches of prosopography can be quantified, graphed, and assessed. Together with other complex systems studies, prosopographical networks form part of the field of network science.

In the field of historical studies, the term network has been used in a metaphorical sense alone for a long time. The sociological focus, despite the vast spectrum of tools and methods at its disposal, does not deal with limited extraction of relational data from fragmentary and even contradictory sources. Along with the paucity of sources, this hampers the comprehensive, valid and meaningful application of methods drawn from social network analysis. Despite these obstacles, the relational perspective of network analysis has helped historical research and prosopography to gain an entirely new methodological vantage point. Social network theory may be able to overcome conceptual and epistemological difficulties presented by historical objects of study and historical sources. Constructing a prosopographical network can offer an alternative, more fluid interpretation of communities in the past, which allows us to take account of coexisting, sometimes overlapping, networks of different sources and geographical delimitations.

== Pioneer works ==
- Ruffini, Giovanni, and Shawn Graham. “Network Analysis and Greco-Roman Prosopography.” In Prosopography approaches and applications: A handbook. Edited by K. S. B. Keats-Rohan, 325–36. Oxford: Unit for Prosopographical Research, Linacre College, University of Oxford, 2007.
- Josie M. Abbott used prosopography to construct a group biography of women secretarial workers in the late 19th and early 20th centuries in The Angel in the Office (2009).
- Sociologist Michael Erben explored the use of prosopography to investigate what might be called a street biography in "A Preliminary Prosopography of the Victorian Street", (1996). Sourced mainly from census records, the data used included not only the demography but also the spatial classifications, occupations, and domestic arrangements of a street in Victorian Oxford. This material forms what Erben describes as an Unaffiliated or Disinterested Group, i.e. spatial locale may be all inhabitants had in common, unlike Intentional Groups, with explicit shared interests, found in more traditional prosopography. The work shows that such Unaffiliated Groups can yield much information on subjects such as social mobility in a given place and time.
- Debra Nails compiled a prosopography of Plato and other Socratics by exploring the biographies of each person mentioned in the Socratic literature in an attempt to explore how Socrates interacted with others. Plato mentions many contemporaries of Socrates, from political figures to sophists, often using them as characters in the dialogs and foils for his criticism.
- Building on Robert M. Hartwell's initial work, Peter Bol (Harvard), Michael Fuller (UC Irvine), Deng Xiaonan (Peking University), and Lau Nap-yin (academia Sinica) launched the China Biographical Database project in 2005 as an online and stand-alone relational database of the careers, kinship, associations, writings, and other data of Chinese men and women, mainly from the 7th century into the early 20th. CBDB exports query results in formats for statistical, network analysis and GIS.
