= Peter Bol =

Peter Bol may refer to:

- Peter Bol (historian) (born 1948), American historian and Sinologist
- Peter Bol (runner) (born 1994), Australian middle-distance runner
