= Timothy Brook =

Canadian university professor, historian

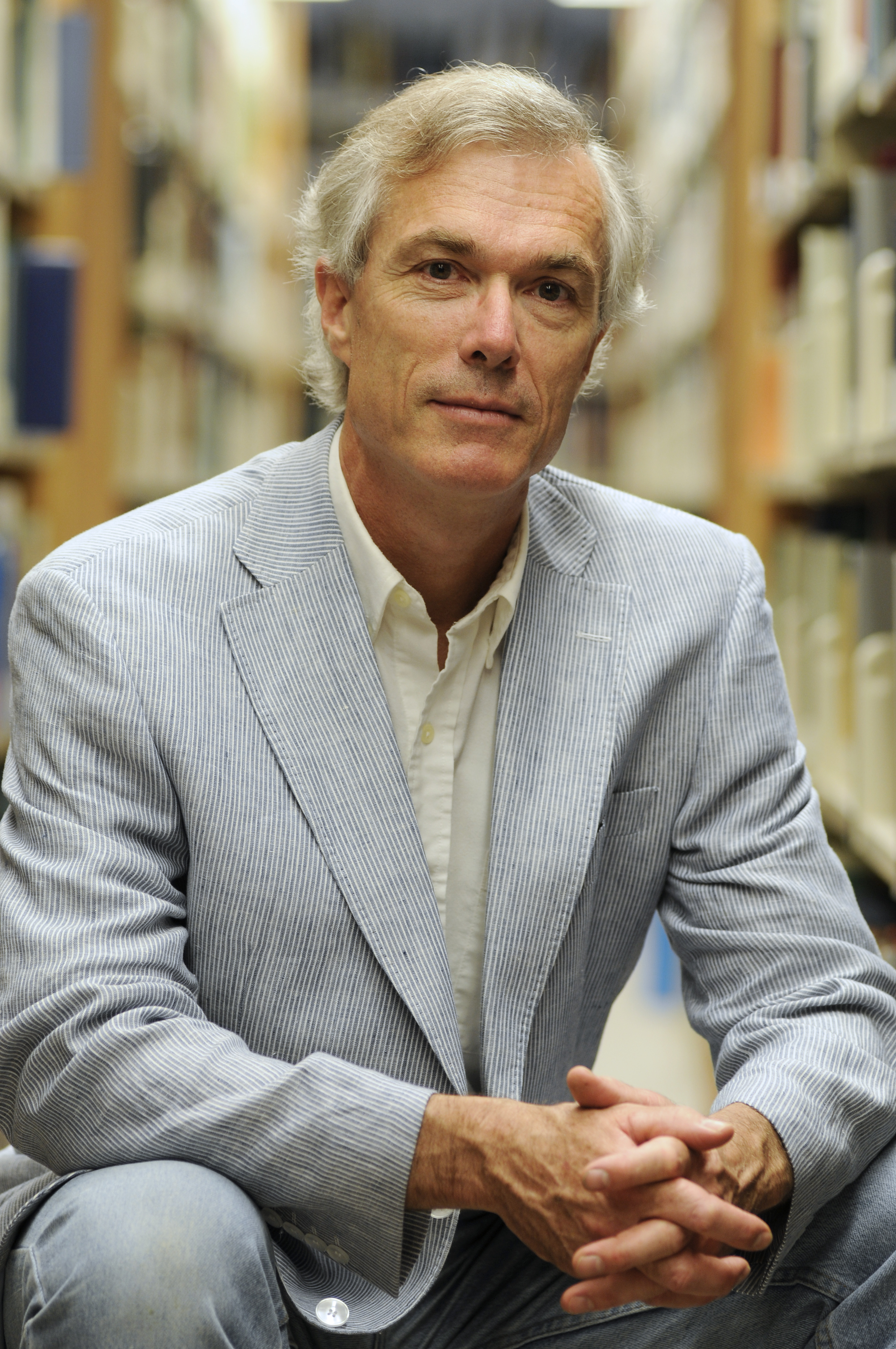
- Born: Timothy James Brook; January 6, 1951 (age 75); Toronto, Ontario, Canada
- Education: University of Toronto (BA); Harvard University (MA, PhD)
- Occupations: Sinologist, historian, writer
- Writing career
- Language: English, Chinese, French, Japanese
- Genre: History
- Subjects: Sinology; cultural, economic, legal and social history; world trade and globalization
- Notable work: Books by the author
- Website: www.timothybrook.com

Timothy James Brook (Chinese name: 卜正民; born January 6, 1951) is a Canadian historian, sinologist, and writer specializing in the study of China (sinology). He holds the Republic of China Chair, Department of History, University of British Columbia.

His research interests include the social and cultural history of the Ming Dynasty in China; law and punishment in Imperial China; collaboration during Japan's wartime occupation of China, 1937–45, the Nanjing massacre, and Japanese war crimes trials; global history; and historiography.

== Early life and education ==
Timothy Brook was born on January 6, 1951, in Toronto, Ontario in Canada, grew up in that city and currently lives in Vancouver.

After graduating from the University of Toronto Schools, Brook received a bachelor's degree in English literature at the University of Toronto in 1973; a master's degree in Regional Studies–East Asia at Harvard University in 1977, and in 1984 received a Ph.D. in History and East Asian Languages at Harvard University, where his dissertation advisor was Philip A. Kuhn .

== Academic positions ==
From 1984–86 Brook was a MacTaggart Fellow at the University of Alberta; from 1986–97 he progressed from Assistant to Full Professor at the University of Toronto; from 1997–99 he was Professor of History at Stanford University, and 1999–2004 he was Professor of History at the University of Toronto, and Shaw Professor of Chinese at the University of Oxford. He came to University of British Columbia in 2004, and was Principal, St. John's College 2004–2009. He is also Academic Director of the Contemporary Tibetan Studies Program at the University of British Columbia's Institute of Asian Research. He was elected President of the Association for Asian Studies 2015.

=== Editorial positions ===
American Historical Review, 2012--; Handbook of Oriental Studies, Brill, Leiden; Studies in Comparative Early Modern History, University of Minnesota, Minneapolis; International Journal of Asian Studies, University of Tokyo; Journal of Ming Studies, Taipei; Ming Studies, Society for Ming Studies, New Mexico State University; Shilin 史林 (Historical studies), Shanghai. Since 2008, he has been Editor-in-chief of The History of Imperial China, a six-volume series published by Harvard University Press.

== Honors ==
- 2023 Distinguished Contributions to China Studies Award, World Forum on China Studies
- 2010 D. Litt., honoris causa, University of Warwick
- 2010 Prix Auguste Pavie, Académie des sciences d'outre-mer, Paris, for Le Chapeau de Vermeer
- 2009 Mark Lynton Prize in History, Columbia University School of Journalism and Nieman Foundation for Journalism at Harvard University, for Vermeer's Hat
- 2009 Wallace K. Ferguson Prize, Canadian Historical Association, for Death by a Thousand Cuts
- 2006 John Simon Guggenheim Memorial Foundation Fellowship
- 2005 François-Xavier Garneau Medal, Canadian Historical Association., for The Confusions of Pleasure
- 2000 Joseph Levenson Prize, Association for Asian Studies, for The Confusions of Pleasure

== Awards ==
In 2009, Vermeer's Hat won Brook the Mark Lynton History Prize from Columbia University in New York, worth $10,000 (U.S.). The prize is one of the Lukas Prize Project awards. The book was described as a "bold, original and compulsively readable work of history."

Death by a Thousand Cuts was a finalist and received an honourable mention for the Professional/Scholarly Publishing (PSP) Division of the Association of American Publishers 2008 PROSE Award, in the World History and Biography/Autobiography category.

== Publications ==
Brook's scholarly publications in the fields of Asian social, economic and legal history and international trade include:

=== Books written ===
- Geographical Sources of Ming-Qing History. Ann Arbor: Center for Chinese Studies, University of Michigan, 1988. Second expanded edition, 2002.
- Quelling the People: The Military Suppression of the Beijing Democracy Movement. New York: Oxford University Press, Toronto: Lester Publishing, 1992; Stanford: Stanford University Press, 1998.
- Praying for Power: Buddhism and the Formation of Gentry Society in Late-Ming China. Cambridge: Council on East Asian Studies, Harvard University, 1993.
  - (in Chinese) Wei quanli qidao: fojiao yu wan Ming Zhongguo shishen shehui de xingcheng. Nanjing: Jiangsu renmin chubanshe, 2005.
- The Confusions of Pleasure: Commerce and Culture in Ming China. Berkeley: University of California Press, 1998. Winner of the Joseph Levenson Book Prize of 2000.
  - (in Czech) Čtvero ročních dob dynastie Ming: Čína v období 1368–1644. Prague: Vyšehrad, 2003.
  - (in Chinese) Zongle de kunhuo: Mingdai de shangye yu wenhua. Beijing: Sanlian, Taipei: Linking, 2004.
  - (in Korean) K'waerak ŭi hondon: Chungguk Myŏngdaeŭi sangŏp kwa munhwa. Seoul: Yeesan, 2005.
- Collaboration: Japanese Agents and Local Elites in Wartime China. Cambridge, Massachusetts: Harvard University Press, 2005.
- The Chinese State in Ming Society. London: Routledge Curzon, 2005.
- Vermeer's Hat: The Seventeenth Century and the Dawn of the Global World. New York: Bloomsbury; Toronto: Penguin; London: Profile, 2008.
  - (in French) Le chapeau de Vermeer : Le XVIIe siècle à l'aube de la mondialisation. France: Payot, 2010.
  - (in Italian) Il cappello di Vermeer : il Seicento e la nascita del mondo globalizzato. Turin: Einaudi, 2015.
- Death by a Thousand Cuts, with Jérôme Bourgon and Gregory Blue. Cambridge, Massachusetts: Harvard University Press, 2008.
- The Troubled Empire: China in the Yuan and Ming Dynasties. Cambridge, Massachusetts: Harvard University Press, 2010; Cambridge, Massachusetts: Belknap Press, 2013.
- Mr. Selden's Map of China. Decoding the Secrets of a Vanished Cartographer. New York, Bloomsbury, 2013. ISBN 978-1-62040-143-9
  - (in Italian) La mappa della Cina del signor Selden : il commercio delle spezie, una carta perduta e il Mar Cinese Meridionale. Turin: Einaudi, 2016.
- Great State: China and the World. London, Profile Books, 2019. ISBN 978-1-78125-828-6 <https://profilebooks.com/great-state.html>

=== Books edited ===
- The Asiatic Mode of Production in China. Armonk, NY: M. E. Sharpe, 1989.
- National Polity and Local Power: The Transformation of Late Imperial China, by Min Tu-ki. Co- edited with Philip Kuhn. Cambridge: Council on East Asian Studies, Harvard University, 1989.
- Culture and Economy: The Shaping of Capitalism in Eastern Asia. Co-edited with Hy Van Luong. Ann Arbor: University of Michigan Press, 1997.
- Civil Society in China. Co-edited with B. Michael Frolic. Armonk, NY: M. E. Sharpe, 1997.
- China and Historical Capitalism: Genealogies of Sinological Knowledge. Co-edited with Gregory Blue. Cambridge: Cambridge University Press, 1999.
  - (in Chinese) Zhongguo yu lishi zibenzhuyi: hanxue zhishi de xipuxue. Taipei: Chu liu tushu gongsi, 2004. Simplified character edition: Shanghai: Xinxing chubanshe, 2005.
- Documents on the Rape of Nanking. Ann Arbor: University of Michigan Press, 1999.
  - (in Chinese) Expanded Chinese translation: Nanjing datusha yingwen shiliao ji. Taipei: Shangwu yinshuguan, 2007.
- Nation Work: Asian Elites and National Identities. Co-edited with Andre Schmid. Ann Arbor: University of Michigan Press, 2000.
  - (in Chinese) Minzu de goujian: Yazhou jingying ji qi minzu rentong, 2008.
- Opium Regimes: China, Britain, and Japan, 1839–1952. Co-edited with Bob Tadashi Wakabayashi. Berkeley: University of California Press, 2000.
- The History of Imperial China (6 vols). Cambridge: Harvard University Press (2008-). Editor-in-chief from 2008 to date.
