= Death by a Thousand Cuts (disambiguation) =

Death by a thousand cuts is a method of torture and execution originating from Imperial China.

Death by a Thousand Cuts may also refer to:

- "Death by a thousand cuts" as a metaphor for creeping normality, a process by which a major change can be accepted as normal and acceptable if it happens gradually through small, often unnoticeable, increments of change
- Death by a Thousand Cuts (album), 2002, by Leng Tch'e
- Death by a Thousand Cuts (book), 2008, by Timothy Brook, Jérôme Bourgon, and Gregory Blue
- "Death by a Thousand Cuts" (song), 2019, by Taylor Swift
- "Death by a Thousand Cuts", a song by Bullet for My Valentine from the 2021 album Bullet for My Valentine
- "Death by a Thousand Cuts", a song by Imminence from the 2024 album The Black
- "Death by a Thousand Cuts", a 2021 song by Like a Storm

== See also ==
- A Thousand Cuts (disambiguation)
- Bleed India with a Thousand Cuts, a Pakistani military doctrine
