= François Chausson =

French historian

François Chausson (born 1966) is a 20th-21st-century French historian, professor of Roman history at the Université Paris 1 Panthéon-Sorbonne.

Francois Chausson is a specialist of the middle of the imperial court and historiography of the 2nd to 5th century and has worked on senatorial and imperial epigraphy as well as imperial and senatorial prosopography of the 2nd to 5th century, linked in particular to the study of Augustan History.

== Bibliography ==
=== Books ===
- 1997: collaboration, under the direction of G. Di Vita-Evrard and F. Bérard, L'Épigraphie dans les Mélanges de l'École française de Rome, Rome
- 2003: in collaboration with E. Wolff, Consuetudinis amor. Fragments d’histoire romaine (IIe-Ve) offerts à Jean-Pierre Callu, Rome, (L’Erma di Bretschneider, series "Saggi di storia antica").
- in collaboration with Ch. Bruun, Interpretare i bolli laterizi della zona di Roma : tra storia amministrativa, economica ed edilizia, (Institut Finlandais d’Archéologie de Rome et École française de Rome, Rome 30 March– 1 April 2000), Acta Instituti Romani Finlandiae .
- 2004: in collaboration with H. Inglebert, de deux tables-rondes tenues à l’Université de Paris-X Nanterre, l’une intitulée Costume et société dans l’Antiquité et au Haut Moyen Âge (Nanterre, 23–24 April 2001), Paris).
- 2005: in collaboration with B. Boissavit-Camus and H. Inglebert, La mort du Prince : agonie, deuil, funérailles, de l’Antiquité au Moyen Âge (Nanterre, 2–3 April 2002), 2005.
- 2007: Stemmata aurea : Constantin, Justine, Théodose. Revendications généalogiques et idéologie impériale au Ve s. ap. J.-C., L'Erma di Bretschneider

=== Articles (selection) ===
- 1995: "Vel Iovi vel Soli : Quatre études autour de la Vigna Barberini (191–354)", MEFRA, 107–2, (pp. 671–765)read on Persée
- 1997: "Theoclia sœur de Sévère Alexandre", MEFRA, 109–2, (pp. 659–690) read on Persée.
