= China Historical Geographic Information System =

The China Historical Geographic Information System (CHGIS) is a Historical GIS project for creating a database of populated places and historical administrative units for the period of Chinese history between 222 BCE and 1911 CE. The project creates a dataset which tracks changes in place names, administrative status, and geography. It is a joint project of Harvard University and Fudan University. Its director is Professor Peter K. Bol of Harvard.

== See also ==
- Geographic Information Systems in China
- China Biographical Database (CBDB)
