= The Confusions of Pleasure =

Book by Timothy Brook

- Front cover of The Confusions of Pleasure
- Author: Timothy Brook
- Language: English
- Genre: History
- Publisher: University of California Press
- Publication date: 18 May 1998
- Publication place: United States
- Media type: Print (Hardback)
- Pages: 345
- ISBN: 0-520-21091-3

The Confusions of Pleasure: Commerce and Culture in Ming China is an influential and frequently cited book which explores the economic and cultural history and the "influence of economic change on social and cultural life" in China during the Ming dynasty (1368–1644). The book is written by Timothy Brook, a Canadian historian of China (Sinology). The work won the Joseph Levenson Book Prize of 2000.

== Synopsis ==
The book is organized chronologically, with four sections named after seasons: Winter (1368–1450), Spring (1450–1550), Summer (1550–1642) and Fall (1642–1644).

== Reception ==
Writing for Economic History Services, Richard Lufrano of the College of Staten Island, City University of New York (CUNY), states that the book "provides an eloquently written and comprehensive account of commerce and communication in Ming China especially valuable for scholars working on related questions in other geographical areas. For the specialist, as well as others, the book makes a fundamental contribution by offering a more balanced view of how money and the market economy affected social hierarchy, elite status, and social mobility."

In his review, Danny Yee concludes that "the result is in some ways scattered, but individual sections cohere and the overall effect is that of a mosaic, a multi-faceted picture of Ming China." Describing the writing as "easy reading" and "lively prose", he states that the book "will be a gold-mine for those curious about the historical underpinnings of Chinese commercial traditions", and "recommended to anyone curious about other ways of viewing the world."

== Foreign translations ==
- (in Czech) Čtvero ročních dob dynastie Ming: Čína v období 1368-1644. Prague: Vyšehrad, 2003.
- (in Chinese) Zongle de kunhuo: Mingdai de shangye yu wenhua. Beijing: Sanlian, Taipei: Linking, 2004.
- (in Korean) K'waerak ŭi hondon: Chungguk Myŏngdaeŭi sangŏp kwa munhwa. Seoul: Yeesan, 2005.
