= On New Democracy =

1940 essay by Mao Zedong

On New Democracy is a 1940 essay by Mao Zedong in which he established the concept of New Democracy during the Second Sino-Japanese War. Mao wrote the essay at a time when the Yan'an Soviet was expanding, it reflects his focus on developing a culture of mass politics. The essay discusses the new society to be formed after a successful revolution, envisioning a gradual transition to socialism through the leadership of the Chinese Communist Party and the "patriotic classes", which Mao defined as all anti-imperialist and anti-feudal people.

== History of text ==
Mao wrote On New Democracy in early 1940 while the Yan'an Soviet was developing and expanding during the Second Sino-Japanese War. During this period, Mao was concerned about bureaucratization and sought to develop a culture of mass politics. In his view, mass democracy was crucial, but could be guaranteed only to the revolutionary classes.

According to Mao, he re-read The Communist Manifesto many times during the process of drafting On New Democracy.

Mao later expanded on the principles discussed in On New Democracy in his April 1945 report On the Coalition Government, delivered during the Seventh Congress of the Chinese Communist Party.

These principles were then reflected in the Chinese Communist Party (CCP)'s political views from 1949 to 1952, pursuant to which it was assumed that the initial new democracy would take ten years or more to transition to a socialist society. Later, the Soviet model became increasingly adopted by the CCP, and some of the ideas discussed in On New Democracy and On the Coalition Government were discarded.

Academic Timothy Cheek writes that the essay's persuasive power arose from how it "made sense of China's history and, more important, gave Chinese readers a sense of purpose, hope, and meaning."

== Key points ==
On New Democracy discusses the new society to be formed immediately after a successful Chinese Communist Revolution. It envisions a gradual transition to socialism under a coalition of classes led by the CCP joining the "patriotic classes" willing to resist Japan and develop the productive forces of China. In the text, Mao states, "We shall never establish capitalism under the dictatorship of the Chinese bourgeoise, but a new democratic society under the joint dictatorship of all revolutionary classes in China led by the Chinese proletariat." Mao describes the revolutionary classes as composed of all anti-imperialist and anti-feudal people.

In describing the new democratic republic as a "joint dictatorship of all revolutionary classes," Mao contrasts this proposed New Democracy from both the "old democratic republics" of the west and from the Soviet-style socialist republic.

With regard to economic matters, On New Democracy states that the "new democratic China" would "own the big banks and the big industrial and commercial enterprises." Furthermore:

in the new democratic republic under the leadership of the proletariat, the state enterprises will be socialist and will constitute the leading force in the whole national economy ... China's economy must develop along the path of the 'regulation of capital' and 'equalization of landownership' and must never be 'privately owned by the few' ... We must never establish a capitalist society of the European-American type or allow the old semi-feudal society to survive.

In this framework, the private sector could not "dominate the livelihoods of the people," but the private sector need not be abolished.

== See also ==
- Second United Front
- Democracy in China
- Democracy in Marxism
