= Praying for Power =

History book by Timothy Brook

- Front cover of Praying for Power
- Author: Timothy Brook
- Language: English
- Genre: History
- Publisher: Harvard University Asia Center
- Publication date: February 1994
- Publication place: United States
- Media type: Print (Hardback)
- Pages: 412 pp.
- ISBN: 0-674-69775-8

Praying for Power: Buddhism and the Formation of Gentry Society in Late-Ming China is a history book which explores the relationship between Buddhism and Neo-Confucianism during the 17th and 18th centuries in China (the late Ming Dynasty); tourism to Chinese Buddhist sites, and the patronage of Buddhist monasteries in China by Buddhist and Neo-Confucian gentry during this period. This philanthropy allowed these patrons to "publicize [their] elite status outside the state realm" and promoted the growth of a society of gentry.

The book is written by Timothy Brook, a distinguished Canadian historian who specializes in the study of China (Sinology).

== Synopsis ==
Praying for Power is divided into three main sections:

In Part 1, "The Culture of Buddhism", Brook reviews the development of religious philosophy and politics and the new familiarity with, and openness toward, Buddhism, in what was a Confucianism-dominated society.

In Part 2, "Monastic Patronage'", the author investigates the contributions of the new elite class of gentry, made in the form of "land donations; money and materials for building and renovation; exercise of social and political influence to forward and protect monastic interests; and 'literary patronage,' the composition of admiring poems and essays or the compilation and printing of an institutional history to elevate the prestige of a given monastery."

In Part 3, "Patronage in Context", the author examines in detail patronage by the gentry in three distinct counties: one poor, "where Buddhist institutions were not well developed"; a second, rich, where they flourished; and a third "in peculiar circumstances that allow Brook to highlight the ambiguous position of the county magistrate vis-à-vis monastic patronage."

== Reception ==
Praying for Power is frequently cited in other scholarly works and referred to in documents on the web sites of many educational establishments.

Writing in the international journal of Sinology T'oung Pao, Barend J. ter Haar describes Praying for Power as a "splendid book". He states that this "excellent introduction" is a "sound piece of investigative research" and that the author makes "important contributions" in two areas neglected in study in the West: the social history of Buddhism in late Ming China and social elites.

In The American Historical Review, Lynn Struve writes that the author "makes a substantial contribution to our understanding of a lamentably neglected subject area: the place of Buddhism in late-Imperial Chinese culture and society." She explains that "the core source material of this book is a large body of local and monastic histories, usually called 'gazetteers' (difang zhi and sizhi), and Brook masterfully shows what can be done through assiduous mining of this genre." The reviewer does caution, however, that though the specialist will appreciate Part 3 of the book ("Patronage in Context"), the non-specialist will find it "heavy going".

== Foreign translations ==
- (in Chinese) Nanjing: Jiangsu renmin chubanshe, 2004.

== See also ==
- Buddhism in China
- Confucianism
- History of China
