= Keen Engineering =

Keen Engineering Co. Ltd.
- Company type: Private
- Industry: Construction Services
- Founded: 1960
- Headquarters: North Vancouver, British Columbia
- Products: Engineering Services
- Number of employees: 275 (2005)

Keen Engineering Co. Ltd. was a consulting engineering firm based in Canada and the United States that operated from 1960 to 2005.

In the late 1950s James Keen, in association with Jerry Yost of Toronto, formed Yost Keen and Associates. The company successfully designed many projects in Toronto. They began to build a solid reputation within the consulting engineering industry that started bringing projects from Western Canada.

One of the Western projects obtained by the firm was located in Regina, Saskatchewan. In order to successfully complete this project, the partners decided that an office needed to be set up in Regina. Jim Keen opened the Regina office. By 1960 the two partners agreed to split into two firms, and the Regina office became Keen Engineering Co. Ltd. James Keen and the principals of the newly formed Keen Engineering decided to aggressively pursue the growing Western Canadian market. After conducting a careful analysis of the building services market, the directors decided to open offices in Edmonton and Calgary in Alberta and Vancouver in British Columbia.

Due to market fluctuations in the late 1970s, they decided to close the Regina office. However, the Edmonton, Calgary and Vancouver offices continued to flourish and prosper. In the late 1980s, a new office was opened in Toronto, marking the end of a round-trip journey.

James Keen retired in 1980 and Tom Johnston was appointed president. Johnston oversaw Keen's expansion to total seven offices across Canada and began to consider international projects. After 18 successful years of growth, Johnston retired from the presidency in 1999. James Keen died in 2000, but the company name lived on.

Kevin Hydes was appointed president of Keen in 1998. Under Hydes's guidance, Keen Engineering quickly became a leader in the field of green engineering. This quickly led to the formation of Keengreen - a division of Keen that focused exclusively on green design. This group promoted sustainable design across the entire company so effectively that green design became the company's philosophy. As a result of this new policy, Keen became a world leader in sustainable building design, having over 160 Leadership in Energy and Environmental Design (LEED) accredited professionals on staff by 2005, the most of any organization in the world.

In May 2000, Keen expanded its North American operations by opening an office in Seattle, Washington, and later in San Francisco. In 2001, Keen opened its eighth Canadian office in Ottawa, Ontario.

Throughout its history, Keen Engineering remained 100% employee-owned.

Some of the more prestigious projects that Keen designed include:

- Library Square in Vancouver, British Columbia
- UOIT in Oshawa, Ontario
- Simon Fraser University West Mall Campus in Burnaby, British Columbia
- York University Computer Science Building in Toronto, Ontario
- C. K. Choi Building, University of British Columbia, Vancouver

In August 2005, it was announced that Keen Engineering Co. Ltd. had entered into an agreement with Stantec of Edmonton, Alberta, to merge with their building engineering division. On October 3, 2005, Keen Engineering was officially merged with Stantec and Keen Engineering ceased to exist.
