= Collaboration: Japanese Agents and Local Elites in Wartime China =

2005 book by Timothy Brook

Collaboration
- Front cover of Collaboration
- Author: Timothy Brook
- Language: English
- Genre: History
- Publisher: Harvard University Press
- Publication date: February 2005, 1 March 2007
- Publication place: United States
- Media type: Print (Hardback, Paperback)
- ISBN: 0-674-01563-0 (hardcover); ISBN 0-674-02398-6 (paperback)

Collaboration: Japanese Agents and Local Elites in Wartime China is a history book which investigates collaboration between the Chinese elites and Japanese, following the attack on the Chinese city of Shanghai in August 1937, just before the outbreak of the Second World War, and during the subsequent military occupation of the Yangtze River Delta in China by Japan.

The book is written by Timothy Brook, a distinguished Canadian historian who specializes in the study of China (Sinology).

== Synopsis ==
Following the attack on the Chinese city of Shanghai by the Japanese forces in August 1937, just before the outbreak of World War II, and during the subsequent occupation of the Yangtze River Delta in China by Japan, despite the violence of the assault, many of the Chinese elite came forward to collaborate with the occupying forces, mirroring collaboration with the Nazis in the occupied countries of Europe.

Brook analyzes both Chinese and Japanese archives in order to build up a picture of the collaboration, which extended from Shanghai to Nanjing. He argues that "collaboration proved to be politically unstable and morally awkward for both sides, provoking tensions that undercut the authority of the occupation state and undermined Japan's long-term prospects for occupying China."

== Reception ==
Lucian Pye, writing in the journal Foreign Affairs states that Brook has carefully handled the subject of collaboration which the Chinese are still hesitant to address. He points out that "[Brook's] study concentrates on local collaboration in the Yangtze delta region in Shanghai's hinterland, avoiding the more shocking cases of puppet regimes in north and northeast China and the 'national government' in Nanjing." Despite there being "no shortage of Chinese elites ready to work for the Japanese, [...] the relationship remained complicated and tense."

David P. Barrett, writing in the Chinese Historical Review describes the book as a "finely researched" and "subtly nuanced" study. He says that "what is remarkable is that Professor Brook has uncovered from both the Chinese and Japanese sides archival and memoir literature of a quality that allows him to present case studies that illuminate the ambiguities and complexities of collaboration, not to mention the essential mechanics of how it was sought and arranged." The reviewer concludes that "this work is not only a major contribution to the history of the [Second] Sino-Japanese War and that of modern China; it also makes an invaluable addition to the comparative history of wartime collaboration through recounting the Chinese experience of survival under the occupation state."

R. Keith Schoppa writing in The American Historical Review describes the book as a "superb" example of the doing and writing of history at its best. In addition to painting a compelling picture of the multileveled and multidirectional complexity and ambiguity of politics and society under the occupation, Brook's work is studded with notable insights." The reviewer goes on to say that "Brook's writing style is at the same time urbane and engaging. In sum, this is an excellent study and a great read as well."

Rana Mitter in the International History Review states that the book is "a welcome and necessary part of the new historical thinking about wartime China". It is "meticulously researched, subtly argued, and courageous study of a still delicate topic. It will be of value to all readers who wish to explore the dynamics of the 1937-45 Sino-Japanese War in more detail, and adds depth and maturity to a field that has sometimes seemed the prisoner of the type of nationalist paradigms that Brook seeks to undermine."

Prasenjit Duara in The China Journal states that "Brook has produced a superb book about the vexed problem of collaboration" and commends Brook for providing a most interesting perspective and for "the clear and methodical way in which it proceeds through its historical investigation."

== See also ==
- Collaborationist Chinese Army
- Comfort women
- Events preceding World War II in Asia
- History of China
- History of Japan
- History of the Republic of China
- Military history of China
- Military history of Japan
- Military of the People's Republic of China
- Military of the Republic of China
