= The Troubled Empire =

2010 book by Timothy Brook

The Troubled Empire: China in the Yuan and Ming Dynasties
- Front cover of The Troubled Empire
- Author: Timothy Brook
- Language: English
- Genre: History
- Publisher: Harvard University Press (hardback, 2010); Belknap Press (paperback, 2013)
- Publication date: 8 June 2010; 11 Mar 2013
- Publication place: United States
- Media type: Print (hardback and paperback)
- Pages: 336 pp.
- ISBN: 9780674046023 (hardback); ISBN 978-0674072534 (paperback)

The Troubled Empire: China in the Yuan and Ming Dynasties is a history book about life and events in China in the Yuan and Ming dynasties, between the Mongol conquest of the Song dynasty in the thirteenth century and the invasion by the Manchus from northeastern Asia, following extreme cold and drought in the 1630s.

The book is written by Timothy Brook, a distinguished Canadian historian who specializes in the study of China (Sinology).

== Synopsis ==
The book explores how periods of climate cooling affected the stability of Yuan and Ming China.

== Interviews ==
- Nappi, Carla (24 February 2012). "Timothy Brook: The Troubled Empire: China in the Yuan and Ming Dynasties" (audio). New Books in East Asian Studies. New Books Network.
