= Vermeer's Hat =

2007 book by Timothy Brook

- Front cover
- Author: Timothy Brook
- Language: English
- Genre: History
- Publisher: Bloomsbury Press, Profile Books
- Publication date: 26 December 2007, 16 July 2009
- Publication place: London, England
- Media type: Print (Hardback, Paperback)
- Pages: 288 pp.
- ISBN: 1-59691-444-0 (hardback), ISBN 1-84668-120-0 (paperback)

Vermeer's Hat: The Seventeenth Century and the Dawn of the Global World is a book by the Canadian historian Timothy Brook, in which he explores the roots of world trade in the 17th century through six paintings by the Dutch Golden Age painter Johannes Vermeer. It focuses especially on growing ties between Europe and the rest of the world and the impact of China on the world, during what Brook sees as an "age of innovation" and improvisation.

== Synopsis ==
Brook argues that globalization, which is often taken to be a modern (i.e., late 20th/21st-century) phenomenon, actually had its roots in the 17th century; and he states that it was his intention to surprise his readers with this information, that "people and goods and ideas were moving around the world in ways that their ancestors had no idea was possible." The growth in trade and exploration was facilitated in part by advances in navigation and in shipbuilding technology and also, according to the author, was driven along when European nations such as "England, the Netherlands and France started to fight their way into the trade."

By studying and analysing the paintings of Johannes Vermeer, beginning with his landscape View of Delft (1660), and examining the scant documents detailing his life, the author builds up a picture of the world in which Vermeer lived; and from this he finds evidence of socioeconomic phenomena and globalization. In the case of the port in Delft in the Netherlands, for example, he finds evidence of the Dutch East India Company's operations. This is often said to be the world's first multinational corporation, which competing traders were forced to join; it had quasi-governmental powers, including the ability to wage war, negotiate treaties, coin money, and establish colonies, and played a powerful and prominent role in trade between the Dutch and Asia, including China.

The painting entitled Officer and Laughing Girl (1658), which is shown on the front cover of the book and to which the title alludes, speaks to Brook of the interest people had in the world, which is reflected in the maps of the world frequently seen on walls in paintings, showing a patriotic pride which went along with the emergence of the Netherlands from Spanish occupation, and the painting is also used to examine trade between Europe and North America. The huge felt hat itself, Brook says, is made of beaver under-fur and the origin of that would be via French traders operating in North America. This being before the discovery of the Northwest Passage, the French had been commissioned to find a route to China, and the beaver fur simply helped them "cover their costs." From here, the narrative goes on to talk of other commodities which were available in abundance and traded in the Americas, such as sugar, tobacco, copper, wood in the 18th century, enslaved Africans, and the metallic artefacts and guns which were sold in exchange.

In the painting Girl Reading a Letter at an Open Window (1658), there is a large Chinese porcelain bowl in the foreground (standing on a Turkish carpet), and Brook uses this to introduce the subject of trade with China. Chinese porcelain was just becoming more widely available and featured in many paintings. The porcelain grew very popular in households in Vermeer's time as its price came down and it became affordable to less wealthy families. In sharp contrast to the necessary outward-looking gaze of countries in Europe, the stereotypical view of China was that it had "an adequate resource base for most of its needs, an advanced technology and was not having to look outside of itself for things that it needed." However, Brook maintains that the Chinese did venture out of their country to trade during lengthy periods when they were not prohibited from doing so (due to perceived threats to Chinese authority or to Chinese people), and that the Chinese simply wanted to control the terms of their trade. They did not want traders setting up colonies in their sovereign territory. According to Brook, the Chinese not going out exploring the world did put them at a technological and linguistic disadvantage as they had a very limited world view and lacked experience of the increasingly cosmopolitan world outside their borders. This wasn't so much of a problem in Vermeer's time but was to become more of an issue as Europe's empires grew in the 18th century and 19th centuries.

The fourth painting is The Geographer (1669), often suggested to be modelled by Anthonie van Leeuwenhoek.

Next Brook discusses Woman Holding a Balance (1664).

The final painting is The Card Player (1660).

=== Indra's net ===
In the book, the author uses the metaphor of Indra's net:

Buddhism uses a similar image to describe the interconnectedness of all phenomena. It is called Indra's Net. When Indra fashioned the world, he made it as a web, and at every knot in the web is tied a pearl. Everything that exists, or has ever existed, every idea that can be thought about, every datum that is true—every dharma, in the language of Indian philosophy—is a pearl in Indra's net. Not only is every pearl tied to every other pearl by virtue of the web on which they hang, but on the surface of every pearl is reflected every other jewel on the net. Everything that exists in Indra's web implies all else that exists.

Writing in The Spectator, Sarah Burton explains that Brook uses this metaphor, and its interconnectedness, "to help understand the multiplicity of causes and effects producing the way we are and the way we were." She adds: "In the same way, the journeys through Brook's picture-portals intersect with each other, at the same time shedding light on each other.

== Reception ==
Writing in The Guardian, Kathryn Hughes describes Vermeer's Hat as "an exhilarating book" and "a brilliant attempt to make us understand the reach and breadth of the first global age." She states that "What Brook wants us to understand [...] is that these domains, the local and the transnational, were intimately connected centuries before anyone came up with the world wide web."

Also in The Guardian, Jerry Brotton describes Vermeer's Hat as "the finest book on Vermeer I've read in years." He states that "by deftly unravelling their stories, he gives us a picture of Vermeer unwittingly sitting in at the birth of the modern global world" and concludes that "This is a fabulous book that drags Vermeer away from our complacent Eurocentric assumptions of his insular domesticity."

In the Literary Review, Lisa Jardine describes the book as an "enthralling" "jewel of a study".

In the Washington Post, Michael Dirda writes: "Vermeer's Hat ... provides not only valuable historical insight but also enthralling intellectual entertainment."

In The Independent, T. H. Barrett states that "[Brook] is too good a scholar to treat Vermeer's paintings as straightforward windows into the past, but he does show us how pictorial sources can open "doors" into "corridors" linking up diverse regions of the globe."

Also in The Independent, speaking of the way the author "teases out" detail from the paintings, Lesley McDowell states that "[he] shows, better than anyone I've read so far, the truly subversive power of detail – especially when it's brought to the fore instead of filling in the background."

Douglas Smith writes in The Seattle Times "In Brook's hands Vermeer's canvases, together with a painting by a second-rate contemporary and an old chipped Delft plate, are just bright lures to catch our attention before he takes us on his rich, suggestive tours of the 17th-century world." He goes on to say: "In recounting these tales of international trade, cultural exchange and foreign encounter, Brook does more than merely sketch the beginnings of globalization and highlight the forces that brought our modern world into being; rather, he offers a timely reminder of humanity's interdependence."

Peter Conrad, writing in The Observer, is more critical. He is of the opinion that "Brook is so intent on cost and the grim injustice of expropriation that he can seem crassly unresponsive, indifferent to the almost beatific peace of the paintings" and "knows everything about price, but rather less about value."

== Awards ==
In 2009, Vermeer's Hat won Brook the Mark Lynton History Prize from Columbia University in New York, worth $10,000 (U.S.). The prize is one of the Lukas Prize Project awards. The book was described as a "bold, original and compulsively readable work of history."

== Gallery ==
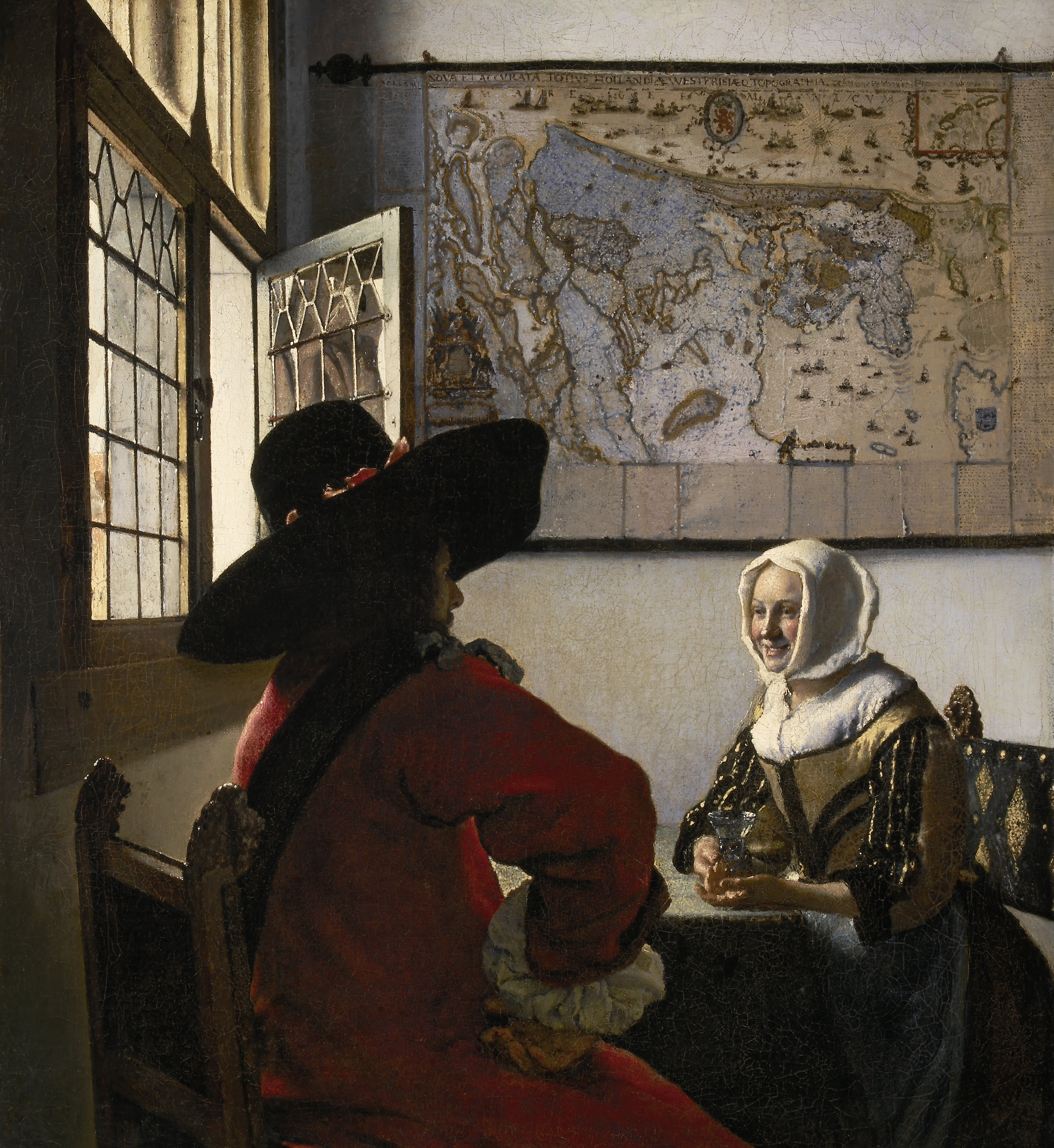
Officer and Laughing Girl

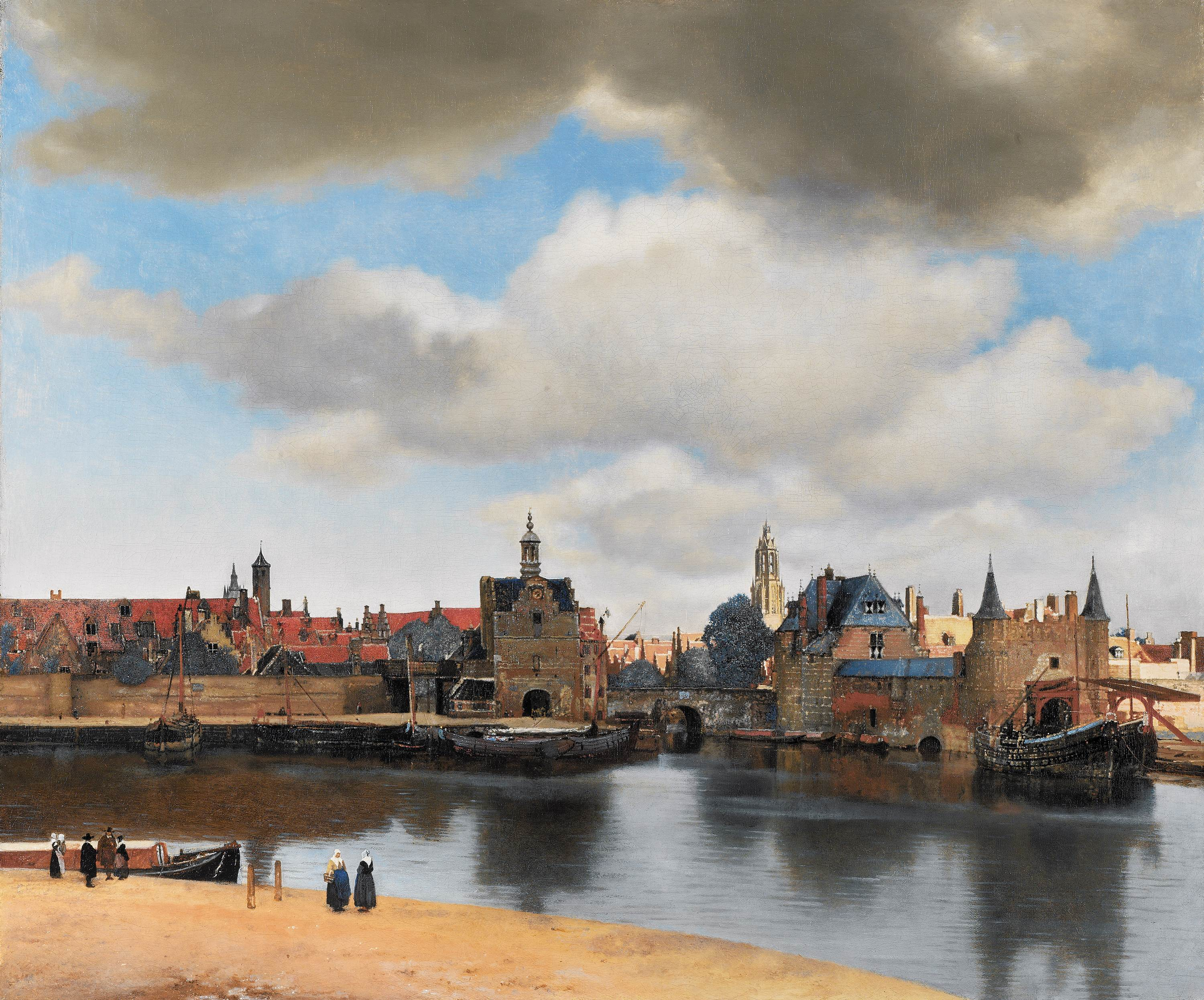
View of Delft

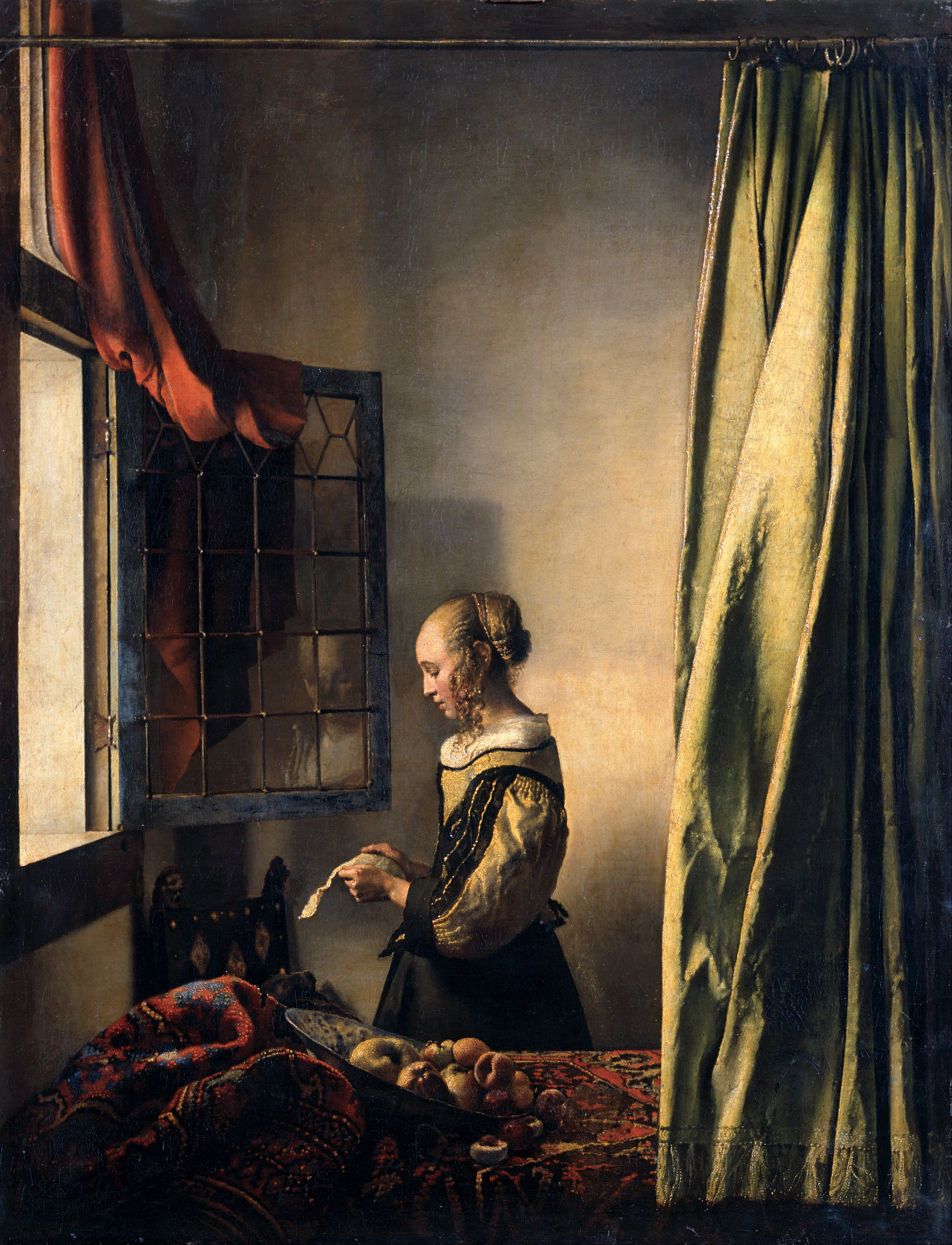
Girl Reading a Letter at an Open Window

== Translations ==
- Brook, Timothy (13 January 2010). Le chapeau de Vermeer : Le XVIIe siècle à l'aube de la mondialisation (in French). Demange, Odile (trans.). France: Payot. ISBN 978-2-228-90493-3.
- Brook, Timothy (November 2010). De hoed van Vermeer. De Gouden Eeuw en het ontwaken van de wereldeconomie (in Dutch). Naaĳkens, Els (trans.). The Netherlands: Wereldbibliotheek. ISBN 9789028423558.

== See also ==
- Age of Discovery
- Baroque
- Dutch Golden Age
- Early modern Europe
- Major explorations after the Age of Discovery
