= Timothy Cheek =

Canadian historian of China

- 齐慕实
- Born: April 3, 1955 (age 71)
- Occupations: Historian, academic
- Known for: Studies of Chinese intellectuals, the Chinese Communist Party, and modern China
- Title: Professor; Louis Cha Chair in Chinese Research; Director, Centre for Chinese Research

Academic background
- Doctoral advisor: Philip A. Kuhn

Academic work
- Discipline: History
- Sub-discipline: Chinese history
- Institutions: University of British Columbia; Colorado College; University of British Columbia Press

Timothy Cheek (simplified Chinese: 齐慕实; traditional Chinese: 齊慕實; pinyin: Qí Mùshí; born 3 April 1955) is a Canadian historian specializing in the study of intellectuals, the history of the Chinese Communist Party, and the political system in modern China. He is Professor, Louis Cha Chair in Chinese Research and Director, Centre for Chinese Research, Institute of Asian Research, at the School of Public Policy and Global Affairs at the University of British Columbia. From 2002 to 2009 he was editor of the journal Pacific Affairs. Before going to the University of British Columbia in 2002, he taught at the Colorado College.

== Education and scholarly career ==
Born 3 April 1955, Cheek is a Canadian historian specializing in the study of intellectuals, the history of the Chinese Communist Party, and the political system in modern China. He is Professor, Louis Cha Chair in Chinese Research and Director, Centre for Chinese Research, Institute of Asian Research, at the School of Public Policy and Global Affairs at the University of British Columbia.

After taking a B.A. in Asian Studies, with Honours, at Australian National University, in 1978, Cheek earned a Master's Degree in History, University of Virginia in 1980. In 1986 he earned a Ph.D., History and East Asian Languages, at Harvard University, under the supervision of Philip A. Kuhn. He told an interviewer in 2020 that "All along I was trained to read lots of Chinese texts, think about them first and foremost in Chinese context, and then tell readers of English what I had found."

From 2002 to 2009 he was editor of the journal Pacific Affairs. Before going to the University of British Columbia in 2002, he taught at the Colorado College.

Cheek has served on the Board of University of British Columbia Press (since 2010), Editorial Board, Journal of the Canadian Historical Association (Ottawa), since 2007) Editorial Board, The China Journal (Canberra), since 2007), Editorial Board, Issues and Studies (Taipei) (since 2004), Editorial Board, Historiography East and West (Leiden/Vienna) (since 2003). Editorial Board, China Information (Leiden) (1998 – ), as well as other executive or advisory positions.

== Contributions and interpretations ==
Scholars such as Merle Goldman, with whom Cheek has collaborated, have tended to see Chinese intellectuals as dissidents or critics of the regime, while Cheek has tended to assume that the intellectuals he studies see themselves as working within the regime, broadly conceived, that is, as "establishment intellectuals." The introduction to a group of essays he edited with Carol Lee Hamrin comments that "anti-establishment intellectuals in China have less to gain and more to lose than their American counterparts", and that since all Chinese intellectuals are state employees, "by playing assigned roles as supporters of the establishment and servants of the state, they gain patriotic self-esteem, outlets for their publications, power over their peers, and opportunities for scarce commodities such as housing and travel abroad".

Analyzing Mao Zedong's 1940 essay On New Democracy, Cheek contends the essay's persuasive power arose from how it "made sense of China's history and, more important, gave Chinese readers a sense of purpose, hope, and meaning."

A review of his edited volume, Cambridge Companion to Mao, wrote that the essays in it "contribute to an understanding of Mao Zedong that is as messy and complex as it is compelling. The text, moreover, encourages readers to engage the problem of knowing the historical Mao, while reminding the reader of the equal importance of Mao’s ahistorical legacy."

== Selected major works ==
- ——; Hamrin, Carol Lee (1986). China's Establishment Intellectuals. Armonk, N.Y.: M.E. Sharpe. ISBN 978-0873323666.
- Goldman, Merle; Hamrin, Carol Lee (1987). China's Intellectuals and the State: In Search of a New Relationship. Cambridge, Mass.: Council on East Asian Studies Distributed by the Harvard University Press. ISBN 978-0674119727.
- —— (1989). The Secret Speeches of Chairman Mao: From the Hundred Flowers to the Great Leap Forward. Mao, Zedong, Roderick MacFarquhar, Eugene Wu, Merle Goldman and Benjamin I. Schwartz, eds. Cambridge, Mass.: Council on East Asian Studies/Harvard University: Distributed by Harvard University Press. ISBN 978-0674796737.
- —— (1994). Wang Shiwei and "Wild Lilies" : Rectification and Purges in the Chinese Communist Party, 1942-1944. Qing, Dai, Edited by, David E. Apter. Armonk, NY: M.E. Sharpe. ISBN 978-1563242564.
- —— (1997). Propaganda and Culture in Mao's China: Deng Tuo and the Intelligentsia. Oxford England; New York: Clarendon Press; Oxford University Press. ISBN 978-0198290667.
- —— (2000), "Books That Help Students Unlearn" (PDF), ASIANetwork Exchange, 7 (3): 18–20
- —— (2002). Mao Zedong and China's Revolutions: A Brief History with Documents. NY: Palgrave. ISBN 978-0312294298.
- —— (2005). "Mao and China in World History High School Textbooks". Education About Asia. 10 (2): 19–20.
- —— (2006). "The New Number One Counter-Revolutionary inside the Party: Academic Biography as Mass Criticism". The China Journal. 55 (55): 109–118. doi:10.2307/20066122. JSTOR 20066122. S2CID 145453303.
- —— (2010). Cheek, Timothy (ed.). A Critical Introduction to Mao. New York: Cambridge University Press. doi:10.1017/CBO9780511781476. ISBN 9780521884624.
- —— (2014), Smith, Stephen A (ed.), Mao and Maoism, The Oxford Handbook of the History of Communism (Oxford Handbooks Online), Oxford University Press, doi:10.1093/oxfordhb/9780199602056.013.041, ISBN 978-0-19-960205-6
- —— (2012). "Of Leaders and Governance: How the Chinese Dragon Got Its Scales" (PDF). Crosscurrents. 2.
- —— (2013). "The Importance of Revolution as an Historical Topic". Journal of Modern Chinese History. 7 (2): 250–253. doi:10.1080/17535654.2013.850865. S2CID 144940753.
- —— (2015). The Intellectual in Modern Chinese History. Cambridge, United Kingdom; New York, New York: Cambridge University Press. ISBN 9781107021419.
