= The Chinese State in Ming Society =

Book by Timothy Brook

- Front cover of The Chinese State in Ming Society
- Author: Timothy Brook
- Language: English
- Genre: History
- Publisher: Routledge (Critical Asian Scholarship series)
- Publication date: 17 December 2004
- Publication place: London, United Kingdom
- Media type: Print (Hardback)
- Pages: 272
- ISBN: 0-415-34506-5

The Chinese State in Ming Society is a history book which investigates the role of the state in China in the Ming dynasty (from 1368 to 1644 in the late Imperial Chinese era); the interface between the state and society, and the effect of the state on ordinary people.

The book is written by Timothy Brook, a distinguished Canadian historian based at the University of British Columbia, who specializes in the study of China (Sinology).

== Synopsis ==
The Chinese State in Ming Society is set in the Ming dynasty, an era in which there was much "commercial expansion and cultural innovation". The book is an "account of events and issues that engaged the members of local elites in Ming society and of the interface between these elites and the state," and the impact of the state on ordinary people in areas such as education, justice, the military and taxation.

The book consists of a reworking of eight "heavily illustrated" essays which Brook has written and published separately over the years, and is divided into four main sections (parts I to IV) with two of these essays to each part of the book. The parts are named "Space", "Fields", "Books" and "Monasteries", each of which "represent important areas of intersection between the Ming state and society."

Brook argues that the model of despotic government fails to account for the complex interactions between individuals, groups, communities, society and state in this period. Instead he proposes that by 1500 the Chinese had a remarkably developed system of governance, surpassing that of the European monarchs of the time, and that the developments were not the result of the isolated actions of the state, but rather of a complex interface and interaction, including local representatives of the state such as magistrates and local networks of the elite class of gentry. According to Ellen Soulliere in her review, Brook argues that "society had the [enduring] ability to constrain, limit and sometimes redirect the authority of the state, without challenging its most basic claim to be the source of all legitimate authority."

== Reception ==
Writing in the New Zealand Journal of Asian Studies, Ellen Soulliere describes the book as a "detailed", "succinct" and "compelling" account. In conclusion, she states that "All in all, this is a fascinating and very valuable book that addresses major themes in Chinese history while greatly expanding our detailed knowledge of the issues that engaged people at the level of their local communities. It illuminates the conflicts and controversies that kept the state and society in a state of dynamic tension throughout the Ming period and beyond."
