= Michael Szonyi =

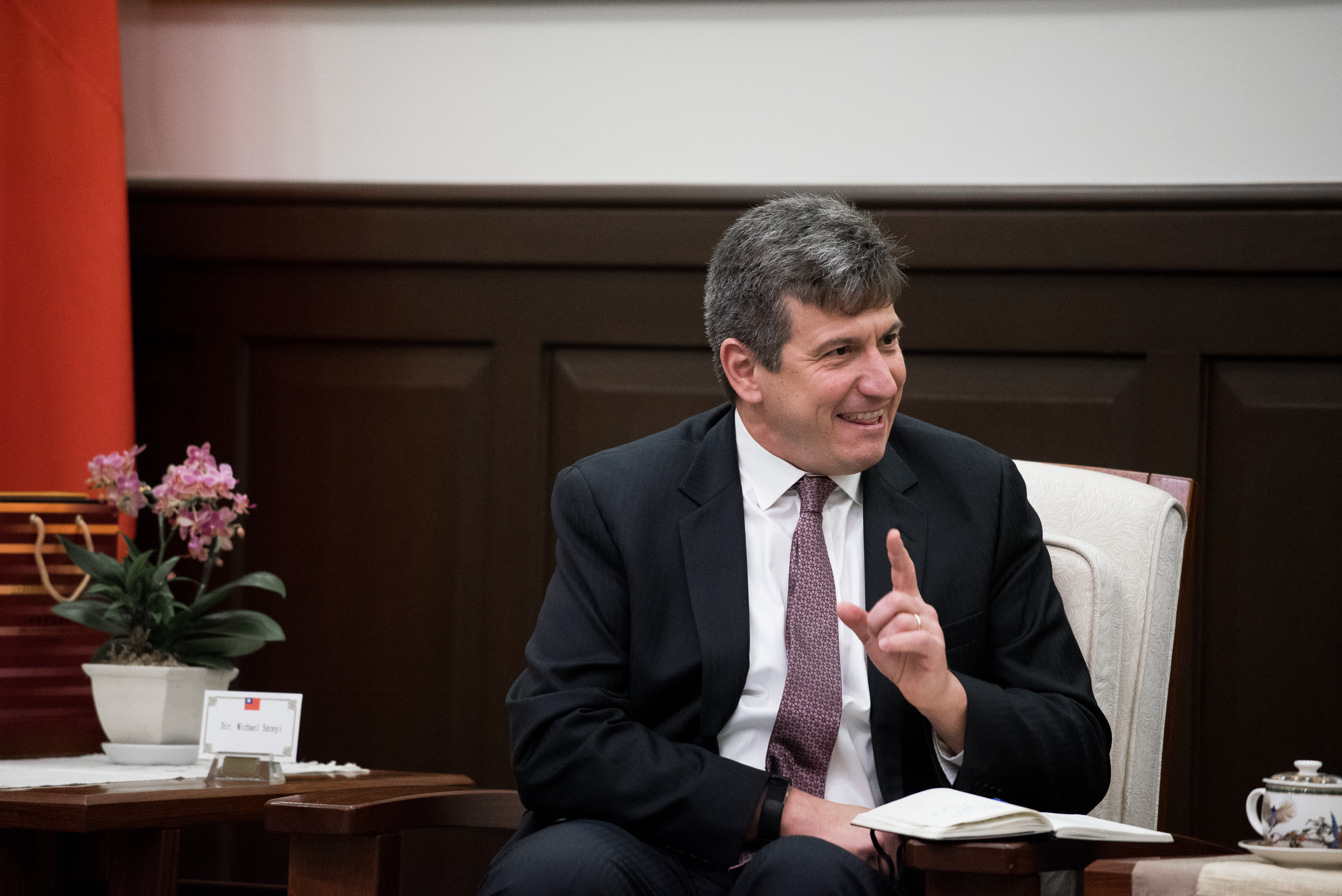
- Szonyi in 2018
- Other names: 宋怡明
- Education: University of Toronto (BA); University of Oxford (DPhil)
- Occupations: Sinologist, historian of China
- Employer: Harvard University
- Organization: Fairbank Center for Chinese Studies

Michael A. Szonyi (Chinese: 宋怡明; pinyin: Sòng Yímíng; born May 18, 1967) is a Canadian sinologist and historian who is the Frank Wen-Hsiung Wu Memorial Professor of Chinese History at Harvard University and former director of the Fairbank Center for Chinese Studies. His research focuses on the local history of southeast China, especially in the Ming dynasty, the history of Chinese popular religion, and Overseas Chinese history.

== Biography ==
Szonyi received a B.A. from the University of Toronto and a D.Phil. from the University of Oxford as a Rhodes Scholar. After completing his doctorate, he worked at McGill University, later moving to University of Toronto, where he received tenure in 2002. Szonyi came to Harvard in 2005, and was named John L. Loeb Associate Professor of the Humanities in 2007 and Professor of Chinese History in 2009. Today he splits his time between Cambridge and London, Ontario, where his wife, Francine McKenzie, is a professor of international relations at the University of Western Ontario. Szonyi was appointed director of Harvard's Fairbank Center for Chinese Studies in 2015.

== Books ==
- Carrai, Maria Adele; Rudolph, Jennifer; Szonyi, Michael, eds. (2022), The China Questions 2 : Critical Insights into US-China Relations, Harvard University Press, doi:10.4159/9780674287495, ISBN 978-0-674-28749-5
- Khanna, Tarun; Szonyi, Michael, eds. (2022). Making Meritocracy: Lessons from China and India, from Antiquity to the Present. Oxford University Press. doi:10.1093/oso/9780197602461.001.0001. ISBN 978-0-19-760246-1.
- Szonyi, Michael; Zhao, Shiyu, eds. (2020). The Chinese Empire in Local Society: Ming Military Institutions and Their Legacies. Routledge. doi:10.4324/9781003001737. ISBN 978-1-003-00173-7.
- Rudolph, Jennifer; Szonyi, Michael, eds. (2019), The China Questions: Critical Insights into a Rising Power, Harvard University Press, doi:10.4159/9780674982703, ISBN 978-0-674-98270-3, LCCN 2017023762
- Szonyi, Michael (2017). The Art of Being Governed: Everyday Politics in Late Imperial China. Princeton University Press. doi:10.1515/9781400888887. ISBN 978-1-4008-8888-7.
- Szonyi, Michael, ed. (2016). A Companion to Chinese History. Wiley Blackwell. doi:10.1002/9781118624593. ISBN 978-1-118-62460-9.
- Zheng, Yangwen; Liu, Hong; Szonyi, Michael, eds. (2010). The Cold War in Asia: The Battle for Hearts and Minds. Brill. ISBN 978-90-04-17537-2.
- Szonyi, Michael (2008). Cold War Island: Quemoy on the Front Line. Cambridge University Press. ISBN 9780521726405. (Chinese edition published by National Taiwan University Press, 2016)
- Szonyi, Michael, ed. (2006). Ming-Qing Fujian Wudi xinyang ziliao huibian (Documents on the Cult of the Five Emperors in Fujian in Ming and Qing). Hong Kong University of Science and Technology South China Research Centre.
- Szonyi, Michael (2002). Practicing Kinship: Lineage and Descent in Late Imperial China. Stanford University Press. doi:10.1515/9781503619623. ISBN 978-1-5036-1962-3.
- Zheng, Zhenman (2001). Family and Lineage Organization and Social Change in Ming-Qing Fujian. Translated by Szonyi, Michael. University of Hawai'i Press. doi:10.1515/9780824842017. ISBN 978-0-8248-4201-7.
