= Prasenjit Duara =

Indian historian

- অসমীয়া: প্রসেনজিৎ দুৱৰা
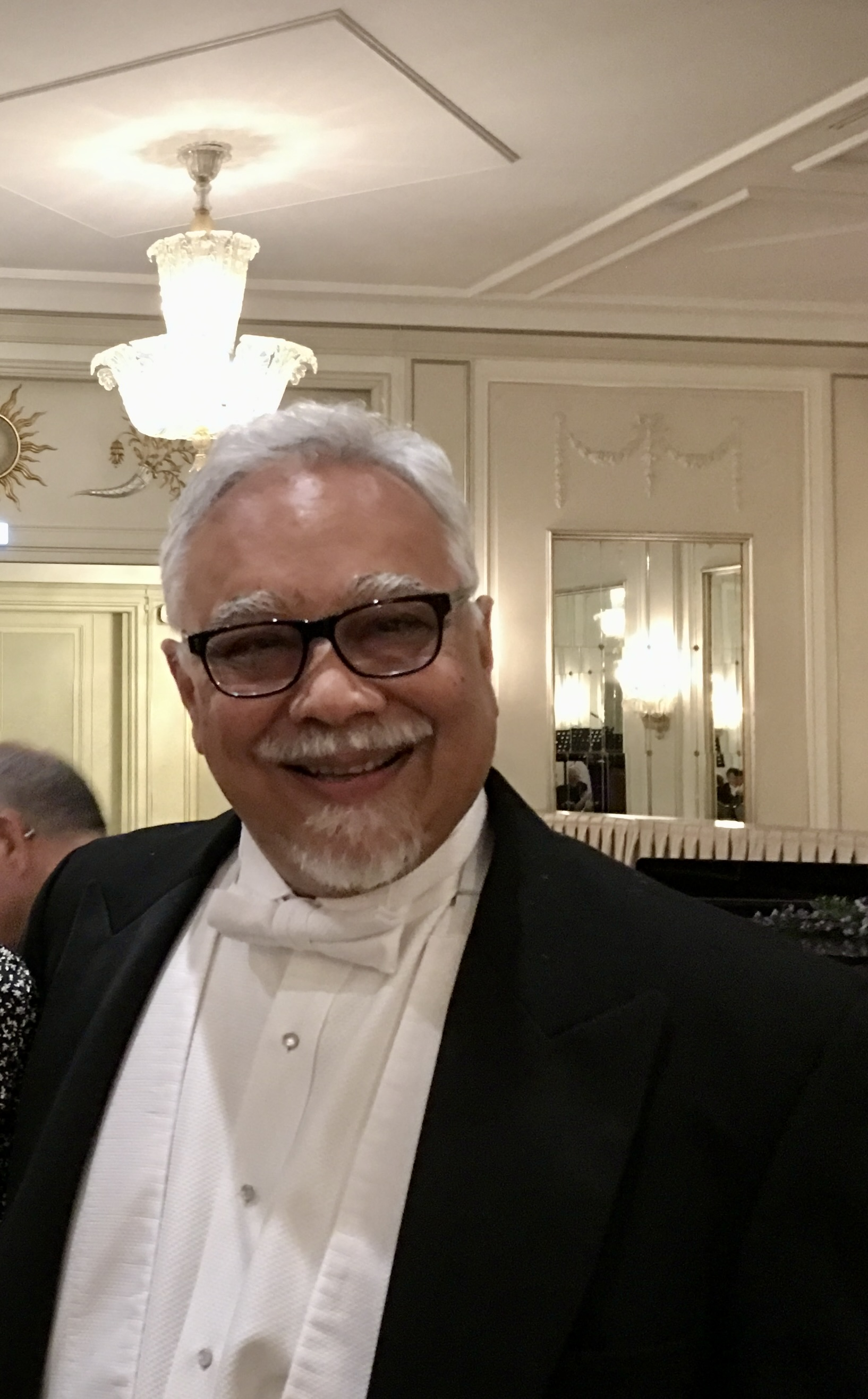
- Duara in May 2022
- Born: Assam, India
- Other name: 杜赞奇 (Dù Zànqí)

Academic background
- Education: Harvard University
- Thesis: Power in Rural Society: North China Villages, 1900–1940 (1983)
- Doctoral advisor: Philip Kuhn

Academic work
- Institutions: Duke University

Prasenjit Duara (Assamese: অসমীয়া: প্রসেনজিৎ দুৱৰা Chinese: 杜赞奇; pinyin: Dù Zànqí), originally from Assam, India, a historian of China, is Oscar Tang Family Distinguished Professor, Department of History, Duke University, after being the Raffles Professor of Humanities at the National University of Singapore, where he was also director of Asian Research Institute and director of research in humanities and social sciences. Duara also taught at George Mason University and the Department of History in the University of Chicago, where he was chairman of the department from 2004 to 2007.

Duara obtained his Ph.D. in 1983 from Harvard University, where he studied with Philip Kuhn. His doctoral thesis was "Power in Rural Society: North China Villages, 1900–1940." His first book, Culture, Power and the State: Rural Society in North China, 1900–1942 (Stanford Univ Press, 1988) won the John King Fairbank book prize of the American Historical Association 1989) and the Joseph Levenson prize for the Association for Asian Studies (1990).

In addition to Chinese history, he works more broadly on Asia in the twentieth century, and on historical thought and the historiography. While his early work was on rural society in early 20th century China, he subsequently turned to studies of nationalism, imperialism, and origins of modern historical consciousness. In an interview in The New York Times about his work on Asian religions and environmental sustainability, Ian Johnson called him "one of the most original thinkers on culture and religion in Asia." He has served as president of the Association for Asian Studies, which has a global membership of about 7000 scholars (2019–2020).

== Early life and education ==
Duara attended the Doon School in Dehradun, India and studied history at St. Stephen's College, Delhi. After obtaining B.A. and M.A. in history from St. Stephen's College, Duara received his M. Phil. in Chinese studies from Jawaharlal Nehru University. He then completed his Ph.D. at Harvard University in history and East Asian languages in 1983.

== Career ==
Duara has taught at Princeton University, George Mason University and has been a Mellon Faculty Fellow at Stanford University. From 1990 until 2008, he taught at the University of Chicago, where he was chair of the China Studies Committee (1994–1996) and subsequently, chair of the History Department (2004–2007). He was the Raffles Professor of Humanities at the National University of Singapore from 2009 to 2015. In January 2016 he joined Duke University as the Oscar Tang Chair Professor of East Asian Studies. He was awarded an honorary doctorate (doctor philosophiae honoris causa) by the University of Oslo in 2017. He was president of the Association for Asian Studies for 2019–2020.

== Selected publications ==
- ------ (2015) The Crisis of Global Modernity: Asian Traditions and a Sustainable Future. Cambridge University Press http://www.cambridge.org/us/academic/subjects/history/global-history/crisis-global-modernity-asian-traditions-and-sustainable-future

New York Times discussion of book, https://www.nytimes.com/2016/10/18/world/asia/china-religion-prasenjit-duara.html?smprod=nytcore-iphone&smid=nytcore-iphone-share&_r=1

- —— (1995). Rescuing History from the Nation: Questioning Narratives of Modern China. Chicago; London: University of Chicago Press.
- —— (2004). Decolonization: Perspectives from Now and Then. London; New York: Routledge. ISBN 978-0-415-24841-9.
- —— (2006). "Nationalism in East Asia". History Compass. 4 (3): 407–427. doi:10.1111/j.1478-0542.2006.00329.x.
- —— (2004). Decolonization : Perspectives from Now and Then. London; New York: Routledge. ISBN 978-0-203-48552-1.
- —— (1988). Culture, Power, and the State: Rural North China, 1900–1942. Stanford, Calif.: Stanford University Press.
- —— (2009). The Global and Regional in China's Nation-Formation. London; New York: Routledge.
- —— (2003). Sovereignty and Authenticity: Manchukuo and the East Asian Modern. Lanham: Rowman & Littlefield Publishers. ISBN 978-0-7425-2577-1.
