= Anthony Kuhn =

American radio journalists

- Education: Washington University in St. Louis; Hopkins-Nanjing Center
- Occupation: Radio journalist
- Years active: 2004-present
- Father: Philip A. Kuhn

Anthony Kuhn (Chinese: 孔安; pinyin: Kǒng Ān) is the National Public Radio correspondent in Seoul, South Korea. Previously, Kuhn served as an NPR correspondent in China, Southeast Asia, and London.

== Education and career ==
He attended high school at the Commonwealth School in Boston, Massachusetts. He holds a degree in French Literature from Washington University in St. Louis, and earned a graduate certificate in Chinese Studies from the Johns Hopkins University-Nanjing University Center for Chinese and American Studies in Nanjing, China.

He served as NPR correspondent for Southeast Asia based in Jakarta, in which capacity he opened NPR's first bureau there, as well as in London.

For a decade, Kuhn was NPR's correspondent in Beijing and reported on stories throughout China and the broader region. He gained national attention in China in March 2017, when a video of him asking questions at a government press conference in fluent Mandarin became popular on the Chinese microblogging site Sina Weibo. On August 1, 2018, NPR announced Kuhn would become their next Seoul correspondent, replacing Elise Hu, who would be moving to NPR West.

== Personal life ==
He is the son of the late Harvard professor and sinologist Philip A. Kuhn.
