= Quelling the People =

Book by Timothy Brook

- Front cover of Quelling the People
- Author: Timothy Brook
- Language: English
- Genre: History
- Publisher: Oxford University Press, Lester Publishing, Stanford University Press
- Publication date: 1992, 1 December 1998
- Publication place: United States
- Media type: Print (hardback, paperback)
- Pages: 292
- ISBN: 0-8047-3638-3 (paper)

Quelling the People: The Military Suppression of the Beijing Democracy Movement is a history book which investigates the conflict between the Chinese democracy movement in Beijing and the communist-controlled People's Liberation Army, culminating in the 1989 Tiananmen Square protests and massacre in Beijing.

The book is written by Timothy Brook, a Canadian historian who specializes in the study of China.

== Synopsis ==
Quelling the People investigates the conflict between the Chinese democracy movement in Beijing, China and the Communist Party-controlled People's Liberation Army. The democracy movement began during the Beijing Spring in 1978 and the conflict culminated in a mass confrontation between the citizens of Beijing and the People's Liberation Army at Tiananmen Square in June 1989. The immediate conflict at Tiananmen Square was brought to an end by the People's Liberation Army which used force, causing the death of hundreds of civilians. The massacre was followed by a "media silence" and the suppression of the democracy movement.

In the book, which centres around a "detailed reconstruction of the Tiananmen Square massacre on June 3 and 4, 1989," the author examines the confusion of, and mistakes made by, the Chinese authorities, as well as the role of the "Tank Man", the civilian who famously stood his ground in front of a column of four army tanks that were leaving Tiananmen Square.

== Reception ==
June Teufel Dreyer, writing in The China Quarterly states that "the author skillfully weaves eyewitness accounts into a smoothly flowing narrative. Two maps of Beijing assist the reader in following the actions described, and there is a useful chronology of events. The work should interest both generalists and specialists, and spans the disciplines of history, political science, and sociology." However, the reviewer finds it "difficult to accept Brook's conclusion, advanced in the final pages of the book and without prior conceptualization" in which he makes a "startling last-minute resort to external imperialism-as-bogeyman."

In the journal Pacific Affairs, Tony Saich is of the opinion that "the author has done a magnificent job of reconstructing the military mobilization in Beijing and the role of the People's Liberation Army in the bloody suppression of the Chinese people's movement." He sums up Quelling the People as "a moving book that vividly displays the extraordinary bravery of the residents of Beijing."

== See also ==
- Democracy in China
- Tibetan Government in Exile
- Invasion of Tibet
