= China at War =

2017 book by sinologist Hans van de Ven

China at War: Triumph and Tragedy in the Emergence of the New China 1937–1952
- First edition
- Author: Hans van de Ven
- Language: English
- Subject: Second Sino-Japanese War; Korean War
- Genre: Non-fiction
- Publisher: Profile Books (UK); Harvard University Press (US)
- Publication date: 2017

China at War: Triumph and Tragedy in the Emergence of the New China 1937–1952 is a 2017 non-fiction book by Hans van de Ven, published in the United Kingdom by Profile Books and in the United States in 2018 by Harvard University Press. It discusses the Second Sino-Japanese War and the Korean War. The American version of the title omits the years and is as China at War: Triumph and Tragedy in the Emergence of the New China.

Daqing Yang of George Washington University stated that the book "places China’s experience of warfare in world historical terms" in addition to "[emphasizing] warfare as a central theme".

== Release ==
Its Traditional Chinese translation, with the title 戰火中國1937–1952：流轉的勝利與悲劇，近代新中國的內爆與崛起, was published by Linking Publishing Co. (聯經出版公司) of Taiwan, with Ho Chi-Jen (何啓仁; Ho² Chʻi³ Jên², Hé Qǐrén) as the translator.

== Reception ==
Victor Cheng of Australian National University stated that the book "In sum, [...] makes a significant contribution" to Anglophone scholarship on recent Chinese military history.

Diana Lary of the University of British Columbia described the book as an "outstanding study".

Yang stated that it is "clearly the authoritative book" on the subject.
