= C. K. Choi Building =

C.K. Choi Building
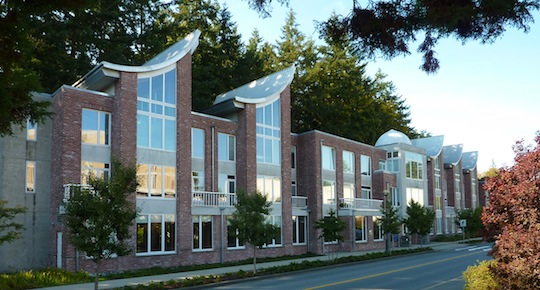
- C. K. Choi Building, street facade, c.2010

- Location within Canada

General information
- Type: University Office Building
- Location: 1855 West Mall, UBC, Vancouver, Canada
- Coordinates: 49.267132°N 123.258405°W
- Current tenants: Institute of Asian Research
- Completed: 1996
- Owner: University of British Columbia

Technical details
- Floor count: 3 storeys
- Floor area: 34,400 sq.ft.

Design and construction
- Architecture firm: Matsuzaki Wright Architects

Website
- www.iar.ubc.ca

The C. K. Choi Building is an educational building on the campus of the University of British Columbia (UBC) known for its sustainable design features. Named for businessman and philanthropist Dr. Cheung-Kok Choi, the building houses UBC's Institute of Asian Research. The architecture of the building implements Asian motifs.

== Institute of Asian Research ==
The Institute of Asian Research, headquartered in the C. K. Choi building, is a research institute founded in 1978 as a major Canadian research centre for Asia.

== Design team ==
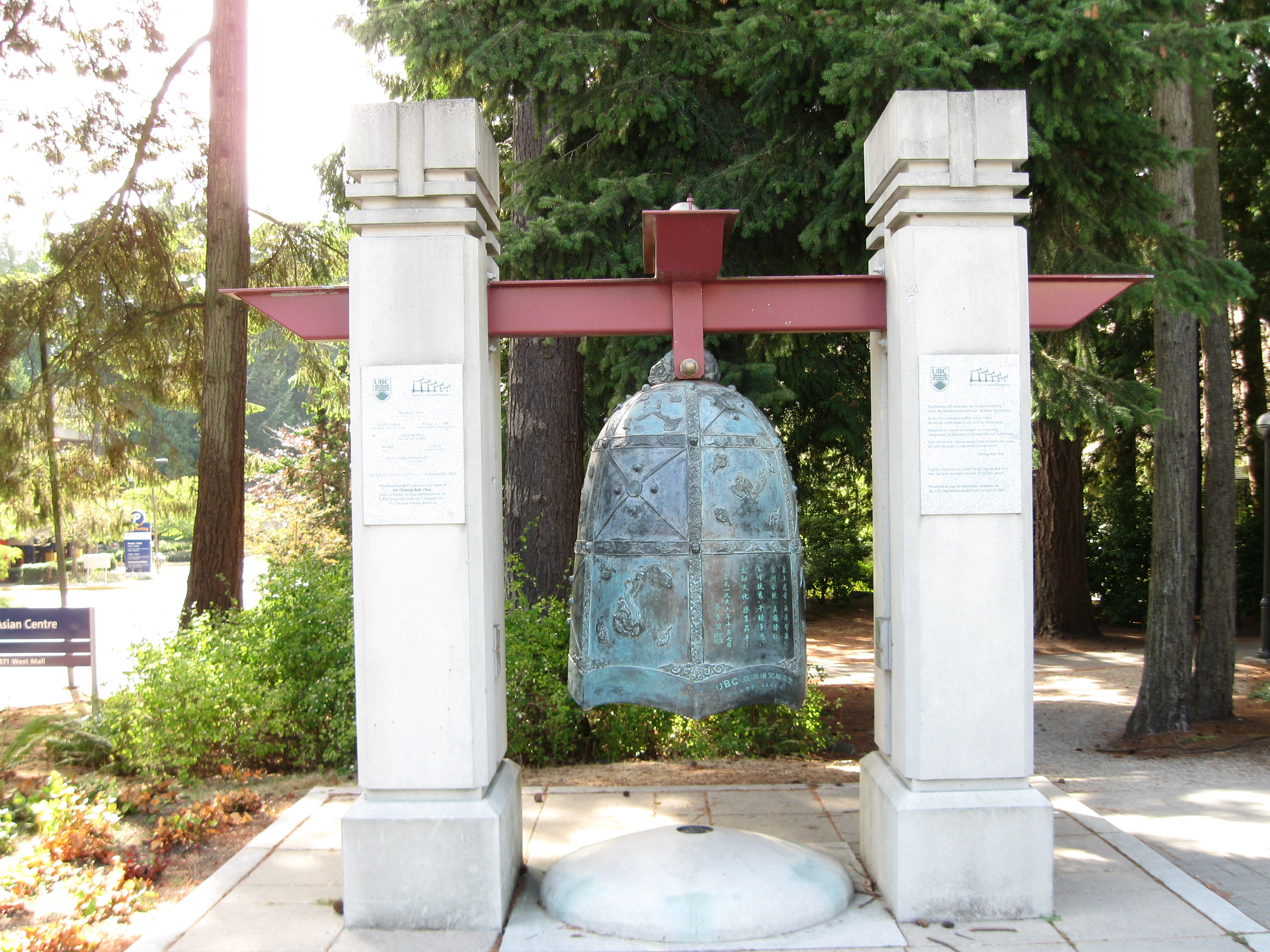
C.K. Choi Memorial Bell at the building's south plaza

- Architects + Sustainability: Matsuzaki Wright
- Landscape Architects: Cornelia Hahn Oberlander
- Structural Engineers: Read Jones Christoffersen
- Mechanical Engineers: Keen Engineering Co. Ltd. (now Stantec)
- Electrical Engineers: Robert Freundlich & Associates Ltd.
- Owner: University of British Columbia, Freda Pagani, Campus Planning and Development
- Owner's Sustainability Advisor: Bob Berkebile, BNIM

== Sustainable features ==
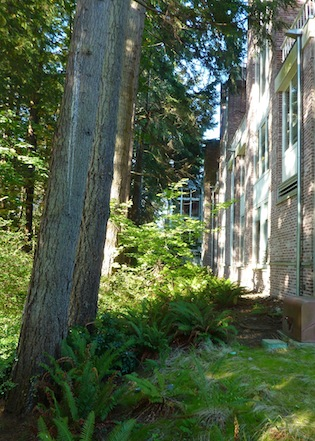
West elevation and preserved stand of evergreen trees providing afternoon shade

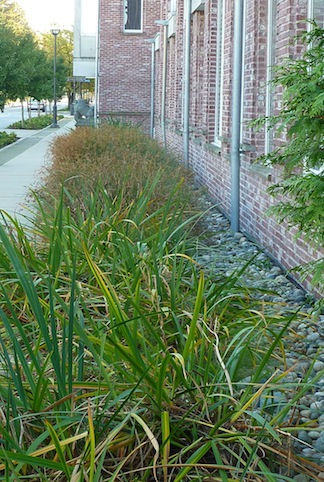
Graywater trench around the building

The C. K. Choi building was designed to be sustainable and energy-efficient. Its sustainable features include:

- Location: built on an existing parking lot surrounded by large trees to reduce heat gain
- Form: narrow profile to minimize site impact and provide natural light inside
- Recycling: approximately 50% of building materials were recycled or re-used
- Sanitation: composting toilets were initially used, but were removed when the compost was found to be detrimental to the environment
- Stormwater: the building's gutters collect water in a tank for irrigation purposes
- Energy: sensors turn off lights when not in use, heavy use of insulation preserves indoor temperature, steam vault utilizes waste heat
- Finishes: most interior surfaces use minimal material, such as unpainted metal and a lack of suspended ceilings
- Air quality: carpet adhesives and solvent finishes were not used in construction, to minimize air pollution
- Ventilation: ventilation is non-mechanical and provides fresh air from windows
- Heat: surplus heat radiating into the ground is collected and utilized
- Electricity: uses only surplus electricity from adjacent buildings

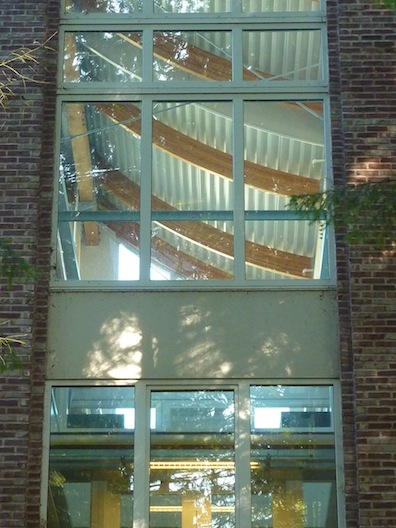
Exposed structure and minimal use of applied interior finishes can be seen

== Awards ==
- 1996 BC Hydro Energy Smart Award
- 1996 British Columbia Earth Award, Building Owners and Managers Association
- 1997 Building Award of Excellence, Consulting Engineers of British Columbia
- 1998 List of Canadian awards, Architectural Institute of British Columbia
- 1998 Award for Innovation Excellence, Architectural Institute of British Columbia (Matsuzaki Wright Architects Inc.)
- 2000 Earth Day 2000 Top Ten Award, American Institute of Architects Committee on the Environment

== Bibliography and External links ==
- IAR official website
- Gudrun, Will. A Constructive Idea, Vancouver Courier, pp. 1,4-5. Vol. 87, No.48, 16 June 1996
- Alive.com - UBC Uses Eco-Sense
- BuildingGreen.com
- Cascadia Building Council
- Cole, Raymond J. Green Buildings: In Transit to a Sustainable World, Canadian Architect, July 1996, Volume 41, No. 7, pp. 12–13. Retrieved online October 2010.
- Cole, Ray, and Steiger, Michelle, Environmental Research Group, School of Architecture University of British Columbia: GREEN BUILDINGS - GREY OCCUPANTS?. Web-Proceedings: American Institute of Architects/US Green Building Council – Mainstreaming Green Conference, Chattanooga, TN, 14-19 October 1999
- Cornelia Oberlander - landscape and building features
- Commission for Environmental Cooperation
- Cascadia Building Council
- Environmental News Network, 9 September 2008
- GreenStudentU - British Columbia's Sewage-Free Building
- IAR - A Constructive Idea
- Marques, Jorge, and Pagani, Freda, and Perdue, Joanne. Process Makes Product: The C.K. Choi Building For The Institute of Asian Research at the University of British Columbia (post occupancy evaluation through December 1998) Retrieved online October 2010.
- Metaefficient.com
- MetroVancouver.org Green Value case studies
- Old to New - Design Guide: Salvaged Building Materials in New Construction, 3rd Edition, 2002
- Prince, Richard E., UBC Department of Fine Arts. Script for an Asian Landscape, p. 18. Design for a New Millenium, ed. E. Laquian (1996). Institute of Asian Research, Vancouver. Retrieved online October 2010.
- Seeing With New Eyes
- SustainableBuilding.com
- Sustainability TV - A Tour of the C.K. Choi Building
- Treehugger.com: Vancouver Building Goes Off-Pipe
- University of Waterloo - case study
