= Hans van de Ven =

Dutch orientalist

Johan 'Hans' van de Ven FBA (born 10 January 1958 in Velsen, Netherlands) is a Dutch historian, sinologist, and an authority on the history of 19th and 20th century China. He holds several positions at the University of Cambridge, where he is Professor of Modern Chinese History, Director in Asian and Middle Eastern Studies at St Catharine's College and previously served as Chair of the Faculty of Asian and Middle Eastern Studies.

== Career ==
Van de Ven completed undergraduate studies in sinology at Leiden University. After studying with Susan Naquin at the University of Pennsylvania, he received his Ph.D. from Harvard University in Chinese history under Philip Kuhn and finished postdoctoral work as a fellow at the University of California, Berkeley. He has particularly focused on the history of the Chinese Communist Party, Chinese warfare, the Chinese Maritime Customs Service and the history of globalization in modern China.

Van de Ven is a guest professor at the History Department of Nanjing University and was an International Fellow at the Hopkins-Nanjing Center, China, in 2005–06. In 2019, he was appointed as an honorary visiting professor at the Institute of Humanities and Social Sciences at Peking University.

Since 2022, he has been a visiting chair professor at the Department of History at Peking University.

== Awards ==
Van de Ven was awarded the Philip Lilienthal Prize of the University of California Press for best first book in Asian Studies for his book on the founding of the Chinese Communist Party in 1991 and the Society for Military History 2012 Book Prize for non-US work for the book The Battle for China, which he edited along with Mark Peattie and Edward Drea.

== Personal life ==
Van de Ven is married to Susan Kerr. They have three sons—Johan, Derek and Willem. His wife's father was the late Malcolm H. Kerr, political scientist and President of the American University of Beirut, who was assassinated in January 1984. She wrote a book about her family's quest for truth and justice. Van de Ven is the brother-in-law of Steve Kerr, coach of the Golden State Warriors, former Arizona Wildcats and NBA Chicago Bulls player.

== Bibliography ==
As Author:

- China at War: Triumph and Tragedy in the Emergence of the New China 1937–1952. London: Profile Books. 2017. ISBN 978-1781251942 Cambridge, MA: Harvard University Press. 2018. ISBN 9780674983502. 2017 pbk edition
- Breaking with the Past: The Maritime Customs Service and the Global Origins of Modernity in China. New York: Columbia University Press. 2014. ISBN 978-0231137386.
- War and Nationalism in China: 1925–1945. London: Routledge. 2003. ISBN 978-0-415-14571-8.
- From Friend to Comrade: The Founding of the Chinese Communist Party, 1920–1927. Berkeley: University of California Press. 1991. ISBN 978-0-520-07271-8.

As Editor:

- The Chinese Communist Party: A Century in Ten Lives. Cambridge: Cambridge University Press. 2021. ISBN 9781108842778.
- Negotiating China's Destiny in World War II. Stanford: Stanford University Press. 2014. ISBN 978-0804789660.
- The Battle for China: Essays on the Military History of the Sino-Japanese War of 1937-1945. Stanford: Stanford University Press. 2012. ISBN 978-0-8047-6206-9.
- New Perspectives on the Chinese Revolution. M. E. Sharpe. 1995. ISBN 9781563244285.

Editor of Journal Special Issues:

- "Robert Hart and the Chinese Maritime Customs Service", special issue of Modern Asian Studies, vol. 40:3 (July 2006). Introduction (pp. 545–7) and ‘Robert Hart and Gustav Detring during the Boxer Rebellion’ (pp. 631–663) 2001
- "Lifting the Veil of Secrecy: Secret Services in China during World War II", Intelligence and National Security, 16:4 (Winter 2001), author of 'Introduction' (pp. 1–10) and 'The Kuomintang's Secret Service in Action in South China: Operational and Political Aspects of the Arrest of Liao Chengzhi (1942)', pp. 205–37 1996
- "War in the Making of Modern China" Modern Asian Studies, vol.30:4. Author of 'Introduction' (pp. 737–56) and 'Public Finance and the Rise of Warlordism' (pp. 829–68)
