= A Thousand Cuts =

A Thousand Cuts may refer to:

- A Thousand Cuts (2012 film), an American thriller film directed by Charles Evered
- A Thousand Cuts (2020 film), a Philippine-American documentary film directed by Ramona Diaz
- A Thousand Cuts (2024 film), a Canadian comedy film directed by Jake Horowitz

== See also ==
- Death by a Thousand Cuts (disambiguation)
