= Institute of Asian Research =

Research institute at the University of British Columbia

Coordinates: 49.2673°N 123.258°W

- Formation: 1978
- Purpose: inter-disciplinary study of Asia
- Headquarters: University of British Columbia
- Website: sppga.ubc.ca/institutes-centres/institute-of-asian-research/

The Institute of Asian Research (IAR) is a research institute founded in 1978 at the University of British Columbia (UBC) as the university's focal point for Asia-related policy and current affairs as well as interdisciplinary scholarship on contemporary Asia. It houses major endowments and five research centres that cover Southeast Asia, South Asia, Korea, Japan, and China. It also houses the academic journal Pacific Affairs, which has been published continuously since 1928.

The institute was a founding partner of UBC's School of Public Policy and Global Affairs and its Master of Public Policy and Global Affairs program. It hosts over 50 events and lectures each year that bring together scholars, practitioners, and community members. Its IAR Fellows program has welcomed over 150 fellows to date.

== List of affiliated faculty ==
- Timothy Cheek, Louis Cha Chair in Chinese Research; Co-Director, Centre for Chinese Research
- Paul Evans, Professor Emeritus
- Qiang Fu, Associate Professor (Sociology); Co-Director, Centre for Chinese Research
- Kristen Hopewell, Canada Research Chair in Global Policy and Professor
- Tarun Khanna, Assistant Professor
- Soo Yeon Kim, Korea Foundation Chair in Korean Research and Associate Professor; Editor, Pacific Affairs
- Steven Lee, Associate Professor (History); Director, Centre for Korean Research
- Alex Yu-Ting Lin, Assistant Professor
- Juliet Lu, Assistant Professor
- Kai Ostwald, HSBC Chair in Asian Research and Associate Professor; Director, Institute of Asian Research
- M.V. Ramana, Simons Chair in Disarmament; Co-Director, Centre for India and South Asia Research
- John Roosa, Professor (History); Director, Centre for Southeast Asia Research
- Tsering Shakya, CRC Chair in Religion and Contemporary Society of Asia, Co-Lead, Himalaya Program
- Sara Shneiderman, Associate Professor; Co-Lead, Himalaya Program
- Veena Sriram, Assistant Professor
- Yves Tiberghien, Konwakai Chair and Professor; Director, Centre for Japanese Research

== C. K. Choi Building ==
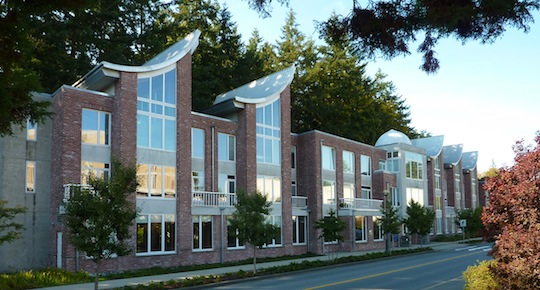
C.K. Choi Building, street facade, c.2010

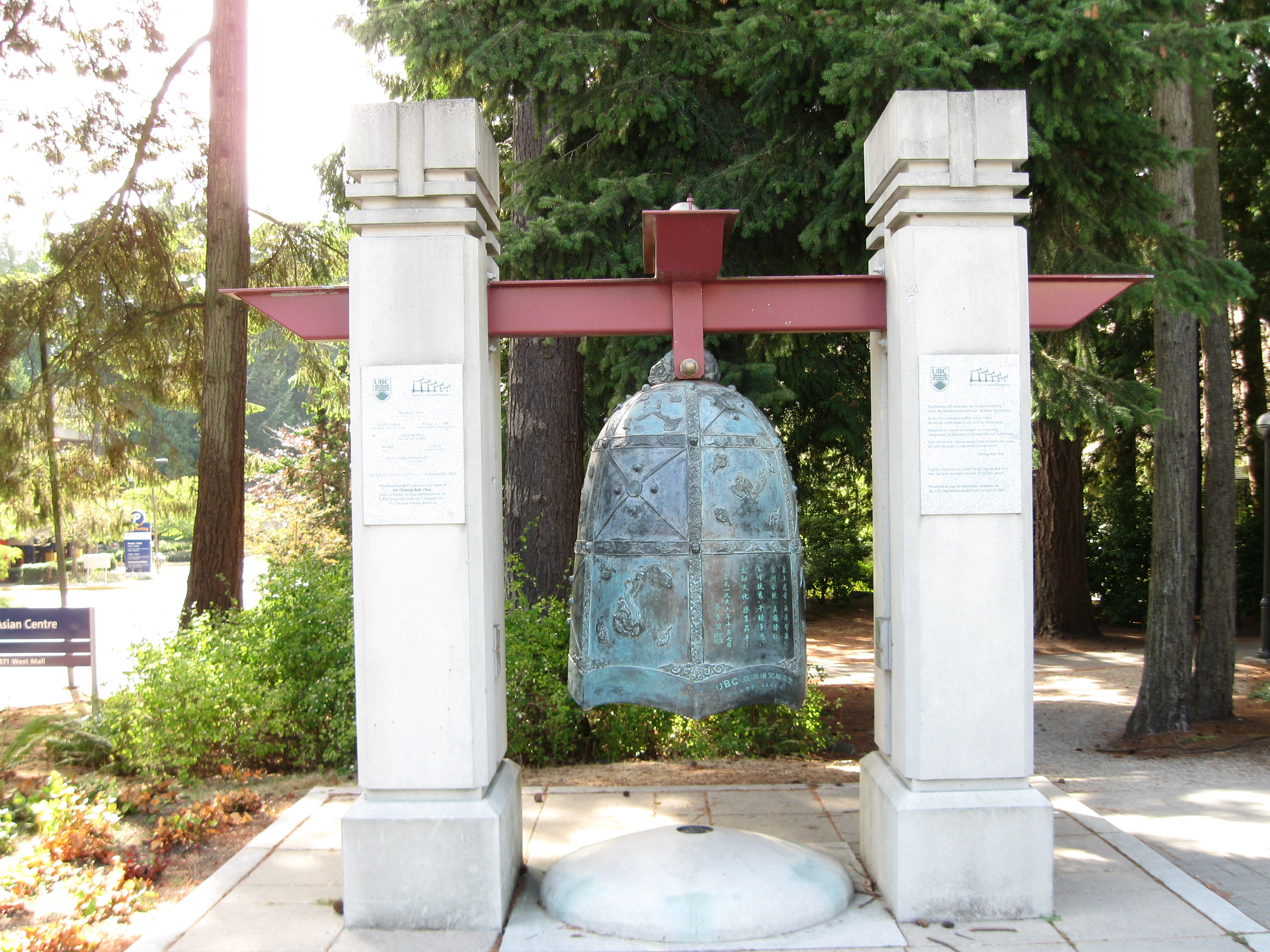
C.K. Choi Memorial Bell at the building's south plaza

The institute is housed in the C. K. Choi Building, a 1995 building notable for its environmentally-friendly design. It was designed by Matsuzaki Wright Architects of Vancouver as the UBC's "flagship environmental building". It features Asian architectural motifs, such as curved roofs.

The building is named after Dr. Cheung-Kok Choi, a businessman and philanthropist as well as a major donor to UBC.
