= Fairbank Center for Chinese Studies =

Organization

Coordinates: 42.375°N 71.113°W

The chop of the Fairbank Center is its institutional logo. (Chinese: 哈佛大學費正清中國研究中心; pinyin: Hāfó dàxué Fèi Zhèngqīng zhōngguó yánjiū zhōngxīn; lit. 'Harvard University Fairbank China Research Center')

The Fairbank Center for Chinese Studies at Harvard University is a post-graduate research center promoting the study of modern and contemporary China from a social science perspective. The center hosts and organizes academic activities, provides research funds for faculty and students, and helps policy-makers and news media to understand modern China. The center sponsors the Edwin O. Reischauer Lectures.

== History ==
The center was established in 1955 as the Center for East Asian Research, and on the retirement of its founding director, John K. Fairbank, was renamed the John K. Fairbank Center for East Asian Research. From its beginnings in 1955, its focus was on modern and contemporary China, diverging from classic sinology, which emphasized the study of texts from a humanistic perspective.

To mark its 60th anniversary, the center hosted a symposium exploring the evolving landscape of Chinese studies and the center’s shifting role within it.

=== Directors ===
List of directors of the Fairbank Center:

- John K. Fairbank, 1955–1973
- Ezra Vogel, 1973–1975
- Dwight H. Perkins, 1975–1976 (acting)
- Roy Hofheinz Jr., 1975–1979
- Philip A. Kuhn, 1980–1986
- Benjamin Schwartz, 1983–1984 (acting)
- Roderick MacFarquhar, 1986–1992
- James L. Watson, 1992–1995
- Ezra Vogel, 1995–1999
- Elizabeth J. Perry, 1999–2002
- Wilt L. Idema, 2002–2005
- Roderick MacFarquhar, 2005–2006
- William C. Kirby, 2006–2007
- Martin King Whyte, 2007–2008
- William C. Kirby, 2008–2010
- Mark Elliott, 2010–2011
- William C. Kirby, 2011–2013
- Mark Elliott, 2013–2015
- Michael Szonyi, 2016-2022
- Winnie Chi-man Yip, 2020-2021 (acting)
- Mark Wu, 2021 - Present
