= William C. Kirby =

American historian

- Born: 1950 (age 75–76)
- Other name: 柯伟林
- Education: Dartmouth College (BA); Harvard University (MA, PhD)
- Occupation: Historian
- Employer: Harvard University

William C. Kirby (Chinese: 柯伟林; pinyin: Kē Wěilín; born 1950) is an American historian and sinologist currently serving as T. M. Chang Professor of China Studies and Spangler Family Professor of Business Administration at Harvard University. He is the chairman of the Harvard China Fund, Faculty Chair of the Harvard Center Shanghai, Harvard's first University-wide center located outside the United States, former Director of Fairbank Center for Chinese Studies, former Chair of the History Department and the former Dean of the Harvard Faculty of Arts and Sciences.

== Early life and education ==
Kirby received his B.A. from Dartmouth College and his M.A. and Ph.D. from Harvard University. He also holds honorary degrees from the Free University of Berlin and Hong Kong Polytechnic University.

== Career ==
He is Honorary Professor at Fudan University, Chongqing University, Peking University, Nanjing University, East China Normal University, Tsinghua University, Zhejiang University, and National Chengchi University and the Shanghai Academy of Social Sciences. He has held appointments also as visiting professor at University of Heidelberg and the Free University of Berlin. He is a Fellow of the American Academy of Arts and Sciences. Before coming to Harvard in 1992, he was Professor of History, Director of Asian Studies, and Dean of University College at Washington University in St. Louis.

He serves on the Board of Directors of Cabot Corporation; The China Fund, Inc.; The Taiwan Fund, Inc.; the American Council of Learned Societies; and Harvard University Press. He chairs the Academic Advisory Council for Schwarzman Scholars at Tsinghua University and serves as Senior Advisor on China to Duke University.

In 2013 and 2014, Kirby created and presented the HarvardX online course ChinaX along with his colleague Peter Kees Bol.

A historian of modern China, his work examines China's economic and political development in an international context. He has written on China's relations with Europe; the history of modern Chinese capitalism; the history of freedom in China; the international socialist economy of the 1950s; and Cross-Strait relations.

== Publications ==
=== Books ===
- Empires of Ideas: Creating the Modern University from Germany to America to China (2022)
- State and Economy in Republican China: A Handbook for Scholars, author (2001)
- Germany and Republican China, author (1984)

=== Edited volumes ===
- China and Europe on the New Silk Road: Connecting Universities Across Eurasia, co-editor (2020)
- Experiences in Liberal Arts and Science Education from America, Europe, and Asia: A Dialogue Across Continents, co-editor (2016)
- Can China Lead? Reaching the Limits of Power and Growth, co-author (2014)
- The People's Republic of China at 60--An International Assessment (2011)
- Prospects for the Professions in China, co-editor (2010)
- China and the World: Internationalization, Internalization, Externalization (Zhongguo yu shije: guojihua, neihua yu waihua), co-editor (2007)
- Global Conjectures: China in Transnational Perspective, co-editor (2006)
- Normalization of U.S.-China Relations: An International History, co-editor (2006)
- Realms of Freedom in the Modern Chinese World, editor (2004)
