= Death by a Thousand Cuts (book) =

2008 book by Timothy Brook and Gregory Blue

- Front cover of Death by a Thousand Cuts
- Author: Timothy Brook, Jérôme Bourgon, Gregory Blue
- Language: English
- Genre: History
- Publisher: Harvard University Press
- Publication date: 15 March 2008
- Publication place: United States
- Media type: Print (Hardback)
- Pages: 336 pp.
- ISBN: 0-674-02773-6

Death by a Thousand Cuts is a book by historians Timothy Brook, Gregory Blue, and Jérôme Bourgon which examines the use of slow slicing or lingchi, a form of torture and capital punishment practised in mid- and late-Imperial China from the tenth century until its abolition in 1905.

== Authors ==
Timothy Brook is Professor of History at the University of British Columbia. Jérôme Bourgon is a researcher at the Institut d’Asie Orientale / Centre National de la Recherche Scientifique, Lyon. Gregory Blue is Associate Professor of History at the University of Victoria.

== Synopsis ==
Death by a Thousand Cuts investigates the use of slow slicing or lingchi, a form of torture and capital punishment practised in mid- and late-Imperial China from the tenth century until its abolition in 1905. Lingchi involved repeatedly slicing the convict's flesh beyond the point of death.

By the time of the final imperial dynasty, the punishment could be meted out for an offence as simple as striking a teacher.

The authors argue that this was more than a physical punishment, as the victim was sedated with opium and killed early in the process, but about denying the victim "somatic integrity" and denying them any hope of a life after death which, the authors argue, caused them to feel shame.

== Reception ==
A staff reviewer at The New Yorker describes the book as a "fascinating study."

A staff reviewer at The Times states that "the authors present a nuanced picture of state-imposed execution and, without at any time condoning, succeed in their goal of contextualising lingchi in relation to Western forms of punishment" and that "this challenging and important work will appeal not solely to Sinologists, but to legal historians and students of visual representation."

Jonathan Mirsky in Literary Review writes that "[the authors] write coolly and formally, but this is a book primarily about torment."

== Awards ==
Death by a Thousand Cuts was a finalist and received an honourable mention for the Professional/Scholarly Publishing (PSP) Division of the Association of American Publishers 2008 PROSE Award, in the World History and Biography/Autobiography category.
