= China Biographical Database =

Biographical database of Chinese people

China Biographical Database (CBDB)
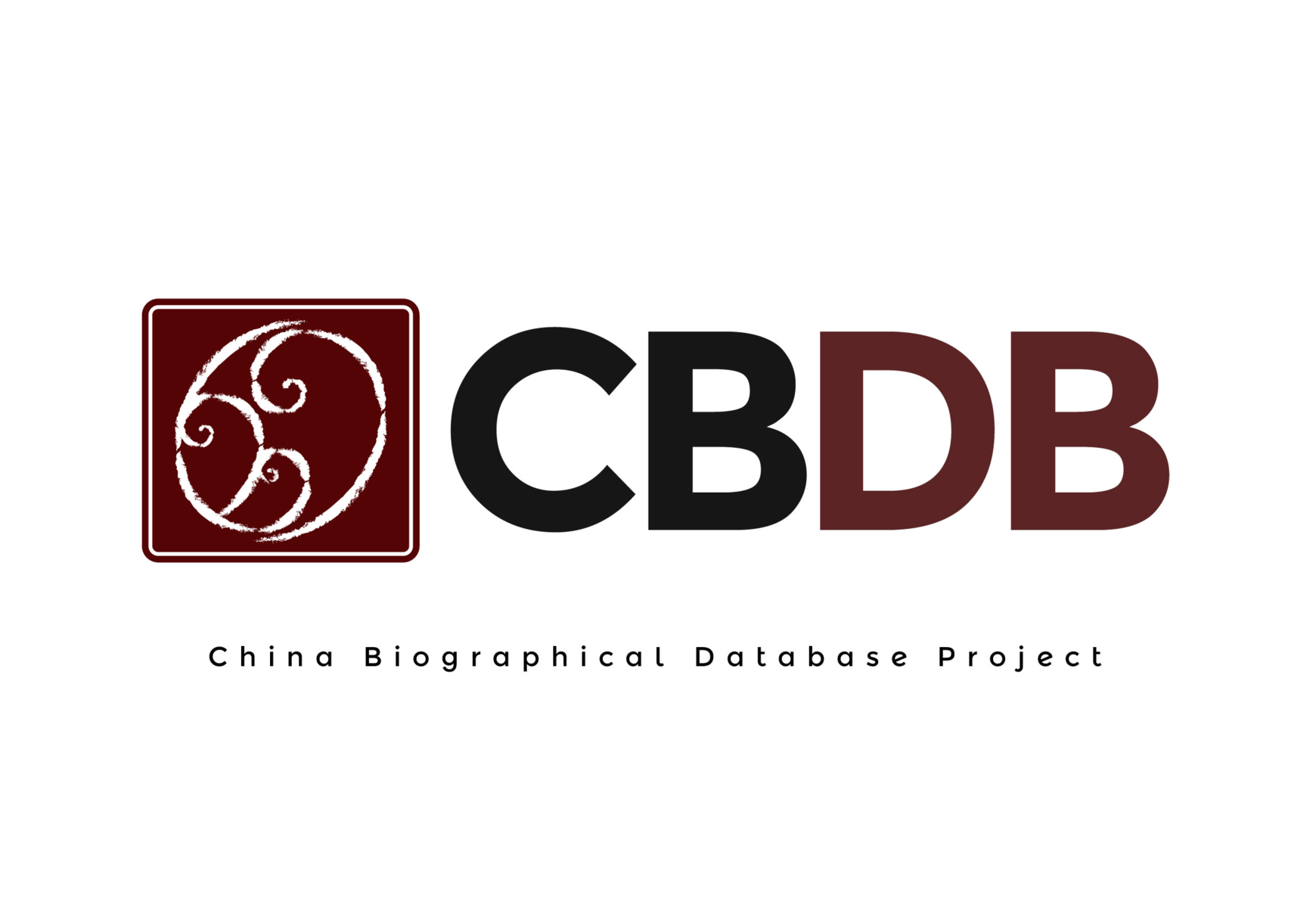
- Languages: English, Chinese

Access
- Providers: Fairbank Center for Chinese Studies at Harvard University, Institute of History and Philology of Academia Sinica, Center for Research on Ancient Chinese History at Peking University

Coverage
- Disciplines: Humanities, Social Science
- Temporal coverage: 7th - 19th centuries
- Geospatial coverage: China
- No. of records: more than 360,000 individuals

Links
- Website: projects.iq.harvard.edu/cbdb/home

The China Biographical Database (CBDB) is a relational database on Chinese historical figures from the 7th to 19th centuries. The database provides biographical information (name, date of birth and death, ancestral place, degrees and offices held, kinship and social associations, etc.) of approximately 360,000 individuals up until April 2015.

== History ==
CBDB was originally started by the late Chinese historian Robert M. Hartwell. Hartwell first conceived of using a relational database to study the social and family networks of Song dynasty officials. Aware of the lack of large dataset research in social and economic history of medieval China, he took the first step to collect large sets of data himself and generate meaningful answers to historical changes through data analysis. One important legacy of Professor is program of massive data which he structured around

1. people,
2. places,
3. a bureaucratic system,
4. kinship structures and
5. contemporary modes of social association.

Before his death Professor Hartwell bequeathed the program, which by then consisted of more than 25,000 individuals, a bibliographic database of over 4500 titles, and multiple geo-reference tools to the Harvard Yenching Institute.

Later, Michael A. Fuller, Professor of Chinese Literature at UC Irvine, started to redesign the application. Professor Peter K. Bol at Harvard also has disseminated extensive digital information for quantitative analysis. As a joint project of Fairbank Center for Chinese Studies at Harvard University, Institute of History and Philology of Academia Sinica (中研院歷史語言研究所), and Center for Research on Ancient Chinese History at Peking University (北京大學中國古代史研究中心), the database has been greatly expanded in temporal and coverage scope.

== Sources ==
CBDB uses wide range of biographical sources to collect information about individuals. The main types of writings covered include biographical index, biography sections of official histories, funerary essays, epitaphs, local gazetteers, preface, writings, letters, and colophons in personal writing collections, and other governmental compiled records.

CBDB is a long-term open-ended project. It has incorporated sources from biographical indexes 傳記資料索引 for Song 宋 (completed), Yuan 元 (completed), and Ming 明, birth-death dates for Qing 清 figures and listing of Song local officials. CBDB is also cooperating with other databases such as Ming Qing Women's Writings (MQWW), Ming Qing Name Authority, and Pers-DB Knowledge Base of Tang Persons (Kyoto) to enrich its entries.

== Limitations ==
CBDB aims at extracting large amount of data from extant sources through data mining techniques. As a result, social and kinship associations, such as might be known from an individual's literary collection, and funerary biographies are not exhaustive. Because of the nature of the sources, career data (e.g. ranks and positions a person held), will be biased toward higher offices. Since the database does not require in-depth research into each individuals, factual errors and contradictory information would also be included in the entries, as long as they are from the primary source.

== Geo-reference tools ==
One area in which CBDB could be used is prosopographical research. By combining geographic information system (GIS) software with CBDB, patterns could be mapped out through queries generated from large datasets, for instance, who came from a certain place and what were the social and kinship connections among all those who entered government through the civil service examination from a certain place within a certain span of years, etc. One useful geo-reference tool for the study of Chinese history is the China Historical GIS (CHGIS) project, which makes datasets of the administrative units between 221 BC and 1911 AD and major towns for the 1820–1911 period freely available. Other GIS software such as ArcGIS or MapInfo (or even GoogleEarth) are also compatible with CBDB output.

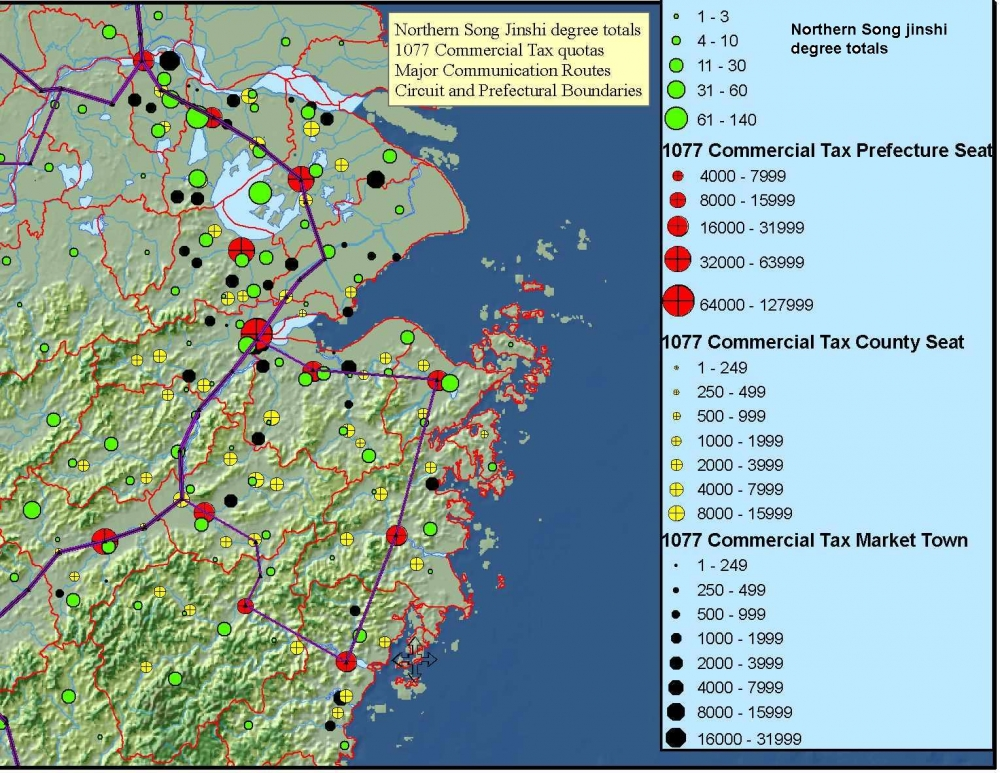
Commercial tax quotas as of 1077 and the success of localities in the civil service examinations during Northern Song

== See also ==
- China Historical Geographic Information System (CHGIS)
