= CBDB (band) =

American progressive rock band

- Origin: Tuscaloosa, AL, United States
- Genres: Progressive rock, jam rock
- Years active: 2011–present
- Labels: Independent
- Members: Cy Simonton; Kris Gottlieb; Glenn Dillard; Paul Oliver; Blake Gallant
- Website: cbdbmusic.com

CBDB is an American progressive rock band based in Tuscaloosa, Alabama. The band was founded in 2011 by Cy Simonton (vocals, guitar), Kris Gottlieb (lead guitar), and Glenn Dillard (saxophone, keyboards). Blake Gallant (bass) joined in 2018, followed by Chris Potocik (drums) in 2020. CBDB are the self-proclaimed purveyors of Joyfunk.

== Releases ==
CBDB's debut album, phone.keys.wallet., was released in November 2012 and saw rapid success, with hook-heavy songs like "Slow Foxes", "Caroline", and "How Long". They released their second album, Joyfunk Is Dead, on February 24, 2015. The facetiously titled sophomore effort takes Joyfunk down a more progressive route while still keeping its hook and groove-oriented roots. In July 2015, the band spent one day in the renowned FAME Studios in Muscle Shoals, Alabama. They recorded four tracks in a 13.5-hour session. They released The Fame EP on September 25, 2015. In July 2016, they spent time at Blackbird Studios in Nashville, Tennessee. They released two singles: "She's Mobile" and "Old Dog", from the sessions in December 2016. Most recently, CBDB released Out of Line in May 2018. They recorded this album at Zac Brown's Southern Ground Studios in Nashville, Tennessee. Two singles emerged from the record: "Unintentional Liar" and "Opelika Yella". In May 2020, CBDB issued the non-album single "Back in Limbo".

== Touring ==
CBDB has built a strong presence through steady touring of the American Southeast, playing headlining shows in halls such as the Georgia Theatre, Druid City Music Hall, Zydeco, Bourbon Street, Terminal West, Proud Larry's, and Exit/In. They have shared the stage with acts including Umphreys McGee, Blues Traveler, The Wailers, The Revivalists, Col. Bruce Hampton (Ret.), and Perpetual Groove, among others. The band has played various music festivals, such as Hulaween, Okeechobee Music Festival, Backwoods Music Festival, Euphoria Music Festival, Summercamp Music Festival, Sweetwater 420 Fest, SlossFest, Electric Forest, and The Werk Out Music Festival.

== Discography ==
Studio albums

- phone.keys.wallet. (2012)
- Joyfunk Is Dead (2015)
- Out of Line (2018)

EPs

- The Fame (2015)

Singles

- "She's Mobile" (2016)
- "Old Dog" (2016)
- "Unintentional Liar" (2018)
- "Opelika Yella" (2018)
- "Back in Limbo" (2020)
