= Benjamin I. Schwartz =

American sinologist (1916–1999)

- Born: December 12, 1916; Boston, Massachusetts, U.S.
- Died: November 14, 1999 (aged 82); Cambridge, Massachusetts, U.S.

Academic background
- Education: Harvard University (BA, MA, PhD)

Chinese name
- Traditional Chinese: 史華慈
- Simplified Chinese: 史华慈
Transcriptions
Standard Mandarin
- Hanyu Pinyin: Shī Huaci

Benjamin Isadore Schwartz (December 12, 1916 – November 14, 1999) was an American political scientist and sinologist who wrote on a wide range of topics in Chinese politics and intellectual history. He coined the English term "Maoism."

He taught at Harvard his entire career, starting in 1950 as an instructor in the departments of history and government. He held the Leroy B. Williams Chair in History and Government from 1975 until he retired in 1987. He was president of the Association for Asian Studies in 1979.

== Early life and education ==
Schwartz was born in East Boston and grew up in a poor family, but graduated from Boston Latin, a school known as a gateway to higher education. He attended Harvard College as a day student on scholarship at a time when poor or Jewish students found the atmosphere unwelcoming. He graduated from Harvard in 1938 with a degree in modern languages, with the honors thesis Pascal and the XVIIIth Century "Philosophes". He started a career in school teaching before studying Japanese in the United States Army during the Second World War and working on code-breaking. After the war he earned an M.A. in East Asian studies at Harvard and went on to gain a Ph.D. there, studying under John King Fairbank.

== Career ==
Schwartz was a member of the Harvard faculty, teaching in Cambridge until he retired in 1987.

In 1983–1984, Schwartz served as acting director of the Fairbank Center for Chinese Studies.

A festschrift in his honour was held after his retirement, and published in 1990 as Ideas across cultures: essays on Chinese thought in honor of Benjamin I. Schwartz (ISBN 978-0-674-44225-2) and published by Harvard University Asia Center.

== Scholarly work and contributions ==
Schwartz's early works studied the relations between political thought and action. His first book was Chinese Communism and the Rise of Mao published by Harvard's Russian Research Center in 1951. The Introduction says he will investigate the movement's “ideas, intentions, and ambitions” over a "limited period,” from 1918 to 1933, and only “in terms of its doctrinal frame of reference and of its internal political relations,” not “the ‘objective’ social and political conditions which have encouraged its growth or in terms of its effect on the masses.” The Communists came to power “on the crest of a popular movement” but this did not mean that they were the “mystic embodiment of the popular will.” Future decisions “will be made by the political leaders and not by the surging masses.” To say that leaders would automatically continue to express the needs and aspirations of the masses would be to “construct a myth designed to sanction in advance all their future activities.”

In the text, Schwartz coined the English term "Maoism", which he used to refer to Mao's pragmatic strategy of revolution that adapted elements of Marxism-Leninism, particularly a disciplined and hierarchical Communist Party, onto a mobilized peasant mass base.

His second monograph, In Search of Wealth and Power, turned to the relations between tradition, modernity, and identity seen in the work of Yan Fu (1854-1921), best known as the translator and interpreter of John Stuart Mill, Charles Darwin, and Herbert Spencer. Earlier scholars had not thought Yan of interest, assuming that he had simply misunderstood these influential thinkers and their late 19th-century liberalism and individualism. But Schwartz used the choices that Yan Fu made in his translations to reflect on the ways in which the pursuit of wealth and power in the West had subverted individual values, even within its own liberal tradition. In 1968 he published a collection of essays following developments of the 1950s and 1960s: Communism and China; ideology in flux (Harvard University Press).

He edited the symposium Reflections on the May Fourth movement: a symposium. (East Asian Research Center, Harvard University; distributed by Harvard University Press, 1972). China and Other Matters (Cambridge, Massachusetts: Harvard University Press ) collected essays from later years.

Writing about the influence of the October Revolution on Chinese thinking, Schwartz contended, "[O]ne of the main appeals of Marxism-Leninism to young Chinese was its appeal to nationalistic resentments. The Leninist theory of nationalism provided a plausible explanation for China's failure to achieve its rightful place in the world of nations."

He also wrote on earlier periods. His 1985 book The World of Thought in Ancient China, published by Harvard University Press, was reviewed in The American Historical Review, Bulletin of the School of Oriental and African Studies, Harvard Journal of Asiatic Studies, China Quarterly, The Journal of Asian Studies, Philosophy East and West, Chinese Literature: Essays, Articles, Reviews, and The Australian Journal of Chinese Affairs.

== Selected works ==
- Schwartz, Benjamin I. (1951), Chinese Communism and the Rise of Mao, Cambridge, MA: Harvard University Press
- In Search of Wealth and Power: Yen Fu and the West. Introduction by Louis Hartz. Cambridge, Massachusetts: Harvard University Press. 1964. ISBN 978-0-674-44652-6.; Harvard University Press, 2009, ISBN 978-0-674-04332-9
- Communism and China: Ideology in Flux (Cambridge, Massachusetts: Harvard University Press, 1968).
- The World of Thought in Ancient China. Cambridge, Massachusetts: Harvard University Press. 1985. ISBN 978-0-674-96191-3.; Harvard University Press, 2009, ISBN 978-0-674-04331-2
- The secret speeches of Chairman Mao : from the hundred flowers to the great leap forward by Zedong Mao (1989)
- Reflections on the May Fourth movement: a symposium, East Asian Research Center, Harvard University, 1972.
- China's Cultural Values, Center for Asian Studies, Arizona State University, 1985
- China and Other Matters. Cambridge, Massachusetts: Harvard University Press. 1996. ISBN 978-0-674-11862-1.

== References and further reading ==
- Bernal, Martin (January 16, 1969). "A Mao for All Seasons (Review of Benjamin Schwartz, Communism and China: Ideology in Flux". New York Review of Books. (Reprinted: China File).
- Price, Don C. (May 1, 2000). "In Memoriam: Benjamin I. Schwartz (1916-99)". Perspectives on History.
- Schwartz, Benjamin; Paul A Cohen and Merle Goldman. (1990). Ideas across cultures : essays on Chinese thought in honor of Benjamin I. Schwartz. Cambridge: Harvard University Press. ISBN 978-0-674-44225-2; OCLC 21227823
- Suleski, Ronald Stanley. (2005). The Fairbank Center for East Asian Research at Harvard University: a Fifty Year History, 1955–2005. Cambridge: Harvard University Press. ISBN 978-0-9767980-0-2; OCLC 64140358
