= Prosopography =

Type of historical investigation

Prosopography is an investigation of the common characteristics of a group of people, whose individual biographies may be largely untraceable. Research subjects are analysed by means of a collective study of their lives, in multiple career-line analysis. The discipline is considered to be one of the auxiliary sciences of history.

== History ==
British historian Lawrence Stone (1919–1999) brought the term to general attention in an explanatory article in 1971, although it had been used as early as 1897 with the publication of the Prosopographia Imperii Romani by German scholars. The word is drawn from the figure of prosopopoeia in classical rhetoric, introduced by Quintilian, in which an absent or imagined person is figured forth—the "face created" as the Greek suggests—in words, as if present.

Stone noted two uses of prosopography as a historian's tool, in uncovering deeper interests and connections beneath the superficial rhetoric of politics, to examine the structure of the political machine and in analysing the changing roles in society of status groups—holders of offices, members of associations—and assessing social mobility through family origins and social connections of recruits to those offices or memberships. "Invented as a tool of political history", Stone observed, "it is now being increasingly employed by the social historians".

== Overview ==
Prosopographical research has the goal of learning about patterns of relationships and activities through the study of collective biography; it collects and analyses statistically relevant quantities of biographical data about a well-defined group of individuals. The technique is used for studying many pre-modern societies.

The nature of prosopographical research has evolved. In his 1971 essay, Lawrence Stone discussed an "older" form of prosopography which was principally concerned with well-known social elites, many of whom were already historical figures. Their genealogies were well researched and social webs and kinship linking could be traced, allowing a prosopography of a "power elite" to emerge. Prominent examples which Stone drew upon were the work of Charles A. Beard and Sir Lewis Namier.

Beard's An Economic Interpretation of the Constitution of the United States (1913) offered an explanation of the form and content of the U.S. Constitution by looking at the class background and economic interests of the Founding Fathers. Namier produced an equally influential study of the 18th-century House of Commons of Great Britain, The Structure of Politics at the Accession of George III, and inspired a circle of historians whom John Raymond light-heartedly termed "Namier Inc". Stone contrasted this older prosopography with what in 1971 was the newer form of quantitative prosopography, which was concerned with much wider populations, particularly "ordinary people". An early example of this kind of work is Emmanuel Le Roy Ladurie's pioneering microhistory Montaillou (1975), which developed a picture of patterns of kinship and heresy as well as daily and seasonal routine in a small Occitan village, the last pocket of Cathars, from 1294 to 1324.

Stone anticipated that this new form of prosopography would become dominant as part of a growing wave of social science history. Prosopography and other associated forms of social science and quantitative history went into a period of decline during the 1980s. In the 1990s, perhaps because of developments in computing and particularly in database software, prosopography was revived. The "new prosopography" has since become clearly established as an important approach in historical research.

== Data in prosopographical research ==
A certain mass of data is required for prosopographical research. The collection of data underlies the creation of a prosopography and, in contemporary research, this is usually in the form of an electronic database. But data assembly is not the goal of the research; rather, the objective is to understand patterns and relationships by analysing the data. A uniform set of criteria needs to be applied to the group in order to achieve meaningful results. And, as with any historical study, understanding the context of the lives studied is essential.

In the words of prosopographer Katharine Keats-Rohan, "prosopography is about what the analysis of the sum of data about many individuals can tell us about the different types of connection between them, and hence about how they operated within and upon the institutions—social, political, legal, economic, intellectual—of their time".

In this sense prosopography is clearly related to, but distinct from, both biography and genealogy. While biography and prosopography overlap, and prosopography is interested in the details of individuals' lives, a prosopography is more than the plural of biography. A prosopography is not just any collection of biographies. The lives of the research subjects must have enough in common for relationships and connections to be uncovered. Genealogy, as practiced by family historians, has as its goal the reconstruction of familial relationships, and as such, well-conducted genealogical research may form the basis of a prosopography.

Prosopography today is commonly done using specialised data models designed to account for the complex nature of historical sources and their relationship with truth: the Factoid Model is common, though other data models such as the STAR (Structured Assertion Record) model also exist.

=== Factoid model ===
The Factoid model is a data model used in the field of prosopography. It is one of the most frequently used data models in modern database prosopography projects. The concept of a factoid in the sense used in the model has been attributed to historians Dion Smythe and Gordon Gallacher, and the wider model was primarily elaborated by computer scientist and prosopographer John Bradley.

In the model, a factoid, also referred to as a source assertion, is defined as "a statement by a modern scholar of a thing a source says about a person". Whilst in general usage factoid is sometimes used to mean something that is specifically untrue, in the factoid model there is no consideration of the truth or untruth of a statement at the data level. Factoids within the same database may therefore be contradictory: the objective is to structure the material from the sources, rather than to provide interpretation. A factoid database is a collection of these factoids, as data entities that thereby connect a piece of source material, a person (or in some cases another entity), and an assertion about that entity or person person.

A major objective of the model was to allow better searches of connected source material, without pre-emptively imposing a particular historiographical viewpoint. It has been noted as an improvement on less structured and provenanced methods used in other historical data collections. One drawback that has been noted for the model is a potential tendency towards positivism: by directly reporting source information as it appears in the sources, it lacks the capacity to present negative information or scholarly inferences. Major prosopographical reference works that use the model include the Prosopography of the Byzantine World, the People of Medieval Scotland, and the Prosopography of Anglo-Saxon England.

== See also ==
- Big data
- Historiography
- Prosopographical network
- Social Science History Association

== Sources ==
- Abbott, Josie M., The Angel in the Office. British Sociological Association, 2009.
- Beech, George, "Prosopography" in Medieval studies: an introduction, ed. James M. Powell, Syracuse University Press, 1992.
- Carney, T. F. "Prosopography: Payoffs and Pitfalls" Phoenix 27.2 (Summer, 1973), pp. 156–179. Assessing results of prosopography applied to Roman Republican history.
- Erben, Michael, "A Preliminary Prosopography of the Victorian Street", Auto/Biography Vol. 4, 2/3, 1996.
- Greer, J, "Learning from linked lives: Narrativising the individual and group biographies of the guests at the 25th Jubilee dinner of the British Psychoanalytical Society at The Savoy, London, on 8th March 1939". University of Southampton, unpublished doctoral thesis, 2014.
- Jones, Arnold Hugh Martin; Martindale, John Robert (1971). The Prosopography of the Later Roman Empire: A.D. 395–527. Cambridge University Press. ISBN 9780521201599.
- Keats-Rohan, Katharine (2000). "Prosopography and computing: A marriage made in heaven?". History and Computing. 12 (1): 1–11. doi:10.3366/hac.2000.12.1.1.
- Keats-Rohan, Katharine, ed. (2007). Prosopography Approaches and Applications: A Handbook. Oxford: Unit for Prosopographical Research. ISBN 9781900934121.
- Krummel, Donald W., "Early American Imprint Bibliography and its Stories: An Introductory Course in Bibliographical Civics", Libraries & Culture 40.3 (Summer, 2005), pp. 239–250. doi:10.1353/lac.2005.0050.
- Lindgren, M., 'People of Pylos: Prosopographical and Methodological Studies in the Pylos Archives (Boreas). Uppsala (1973)
- Radner, K. (ed.), The Prosopography of the Neo-Assyrian Empire. Helsinki, 1998–2002.
- Stone, Lawrence (1971). "Prosopography". Daedalus. 100 (1): 46–71. JSTOR 20023990.
