= Peter Bol (historian) =

American historian and sinologist (born 1948)

Peter Kees Bol (Chinese: 包弼德; pinyin: Bāo Bìdé; born 1948) is an American historian and sinologist. He is the Charles H. Carswell Professor of East Asian Languages and Civilizations at Harvard University. Since 2013, he has been a Vice Provost of Harvard with oversight of HarvardX and the Harvard Initiative in Learning and Teaching (HILT). He is the founding director of the Harvard Center for Geographic Analysis, and also directs the China Historical Geographic Information System (CHGIS) and the China Biographical Database (CBDB) project.

== Biography ==
Peter Bol earned his Ph.D. in Chinese history from Princeton University in 1980. His main research focus is China's cultural elites during the Tang, Song, Yuan, and Ming dynasties (from the 7th to the 17th century). He and William C. Kirby together teach ChinaX, a Harvard massive open online course (MOOC) with a worldwide enrollment of more than 45,000 students.

Bol has been a Vice Provost of Harvard University between 2013 and 2018. In this role, he oversaw HarvardX (open online learning) and the Harvard Initiative in Learning and Teaching (HILT). He is the founding director of the Harvard Center for Geographic Analysis, and also directs the China Historical Geographic Information System (in collaboration with Fudan University in Shanghai), and the China Biographical Database project (in collaboration with Academia Sinica in Taiwan and Peking University).

== Selected publications ==
- with Kidder Smith Jr., Joseph A. Adler, and Don J. Wyatt, Sung Dynasty Uses of the I-ching. ISBN 9780691607764. Princeton University Press. 1990, 2014, 2016.
- This Culture of Ours: Intellectual Transitions in T'ang and Sung China. ISBN 9780804719209. Stanford University Press. 1992.
- coeditor with Pauline Yu, Stephen Owen, and Willard Peterson, Ways with Words: Writing about Reading Texts from Early China. ISBN 9780520224667. University of California Press. 2000.
- Neo-Confucianism in History. ISBN 9780674053243. Harvard University Press. 2010.
