= Architecture of the Ming dynasty =

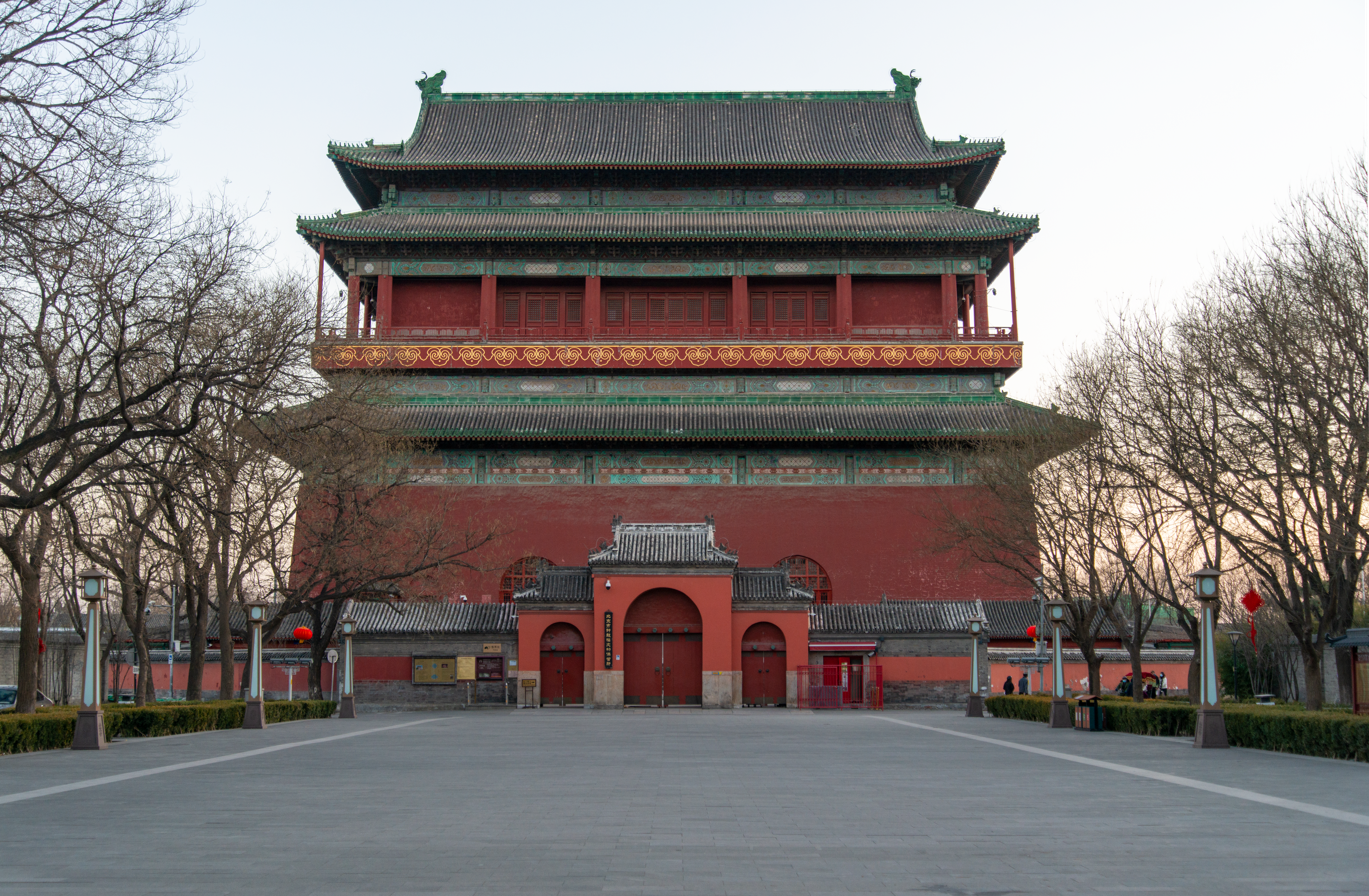
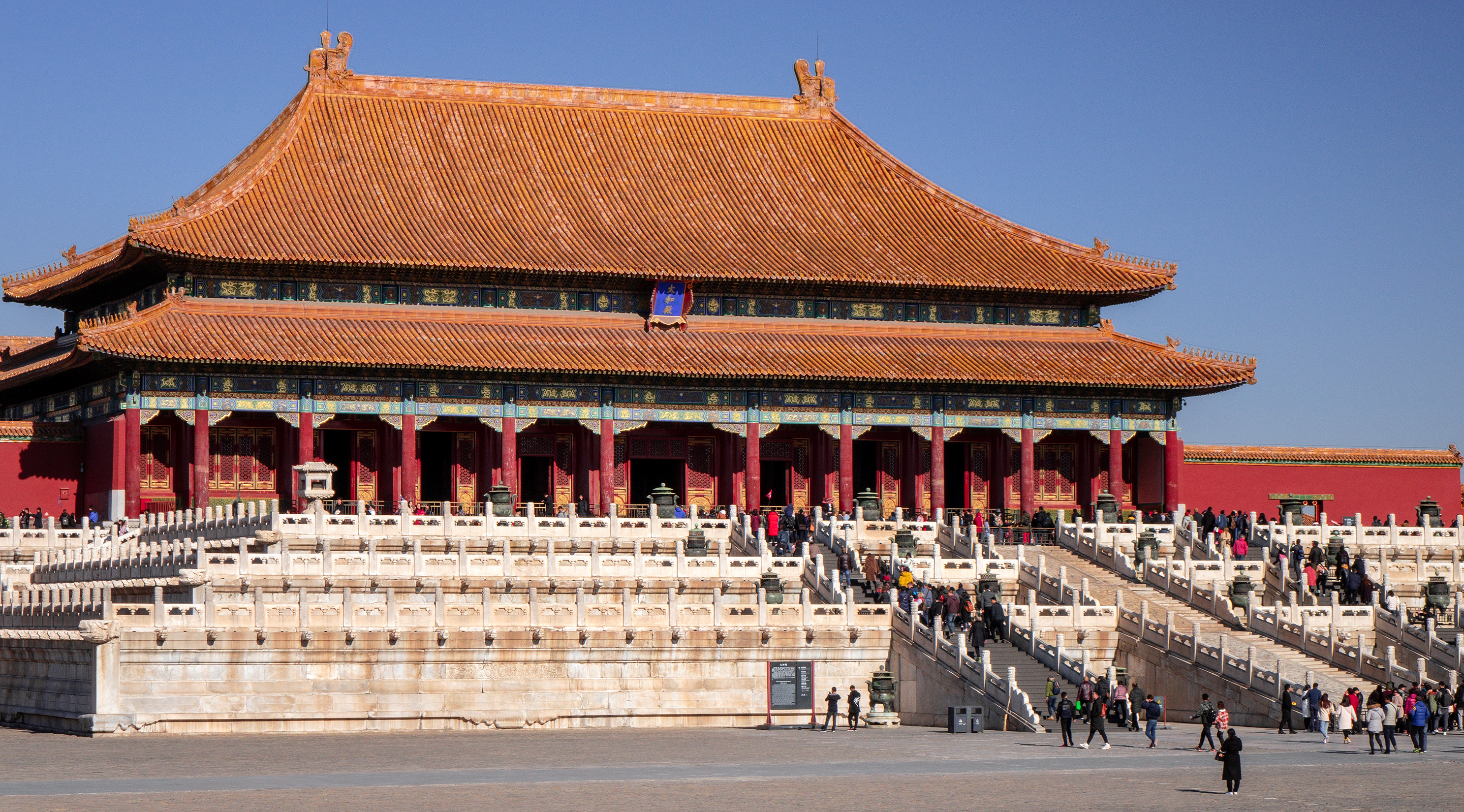
Left: the Drum Tower of Beijing
Right: the Hall of Supreme Harmony within the Forbidden City of Beijing

The architecture of the Ming dynasty includes the development of Chinese architecture from the fall of the Mongol Yuan dynasty in 1368 to the fall of the Ming dynasty in 1644. The Ming dynasty erected a wide variety of structures in China, including towering Buddhist pagodas, temple halls, academies, palaces, city walls and fortifications such as the Ming Great Wall, bridges, canals, pavilions, gardens, and royal tombs.

== Pagodas ==
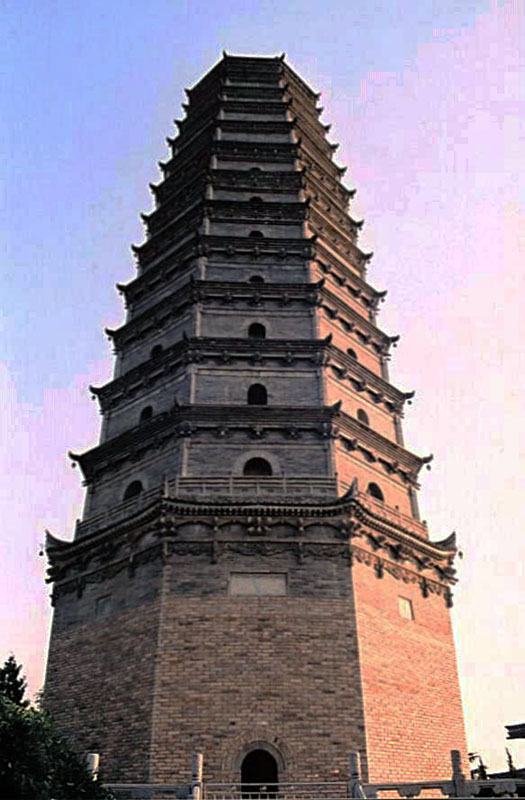
The pagoda of Famen Temple, built in 1579 during the Ming period

After the introduction of Buddhism to China from India in the 1st century during the Han dynasty, the Chinese pagoda was developed during the Southern and Northern dynasties era, and became mature and diverse in form during the Tang dynasty. Its evolution included a variety of architectural sources for its design, including the Indian stupa, the Chinese residential towers developed during the Han dynasty, and Chinese elevated rammed earth platforms lined with stone or brick and crowned with timber structures developed during the Zhou dynasty. Pagodas of the Tang period were mostly constructed of wood but were already being replaced by brick structures due to flammability, while the Song dynasty and Liao dynasty witnessed major improvements in the masonry construction of pagodas.

By the Ming dynasty, masonry was the preferred building method for both Buddhist pagodas and Confucian "Wenfeng" pagodas that contained stone bases with brick towers for greater structural stability and avoiding erosion by moisture. Buildings constructed of both brick and stone were typical of Ming residential and religious structures, and led to the extensive construction of Wenfeng pagodas due to the prominence of both Buddhism and Confucianism. Dry climate zones such as those in northern provinces like Shanxi where earthquakes are also more common led to the higher frequency of wooden pagodas constructed there, whereas the more humid climate in the southern Jiangnan region where earthquakes are less common spurred the widespread building of brick and stone pagodas that survive more easily there.

The Chinese believed that building pagodas on certain sites according to geomantic principles brought about auspicious events. Buddhist pagodas were often constructed within temples, while those built at the mouths of rivers or around towns were built with fengshui geomantic principles in mind.

== Ming tombs ==
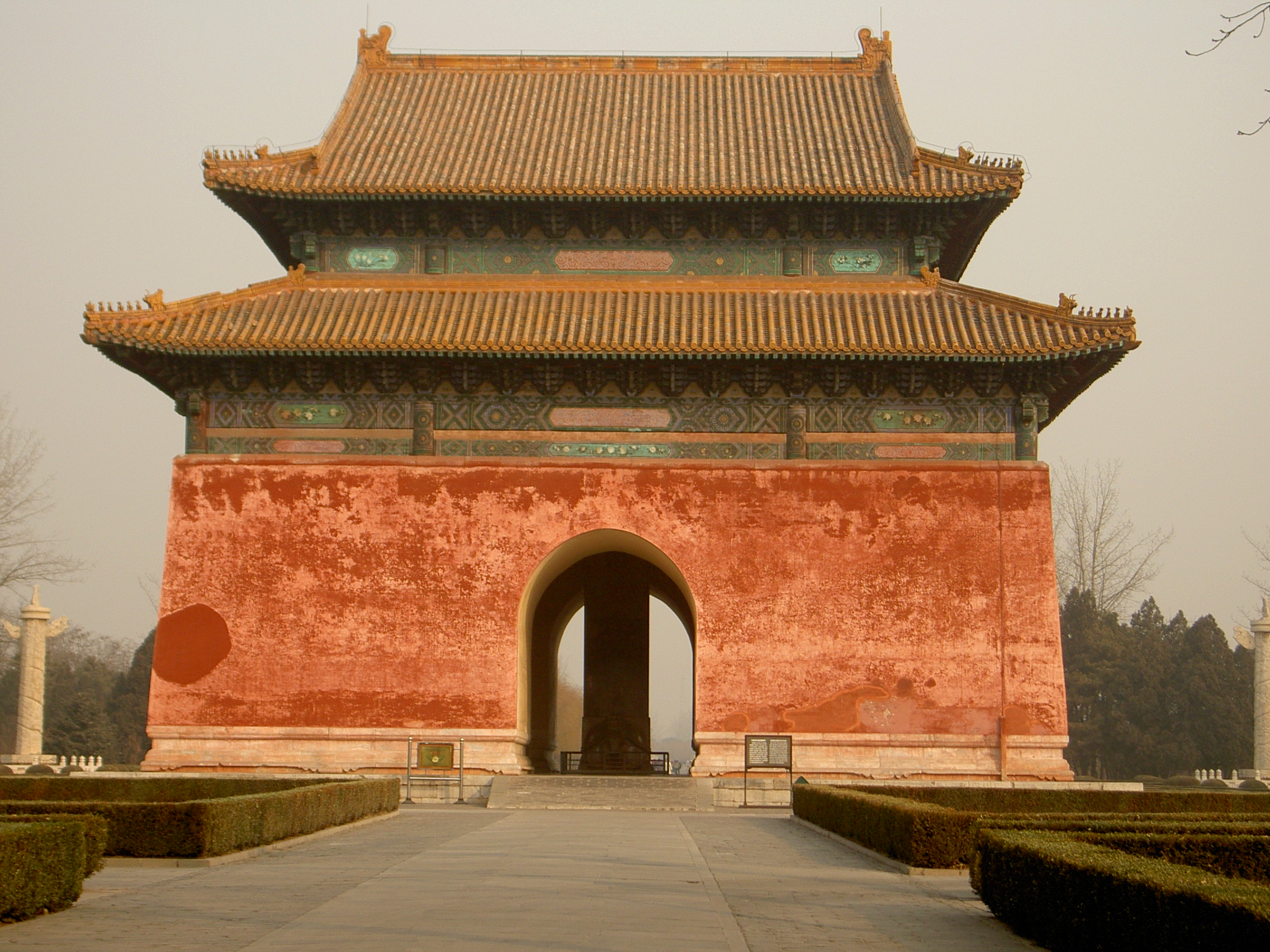
The Shengong Shengde Stele Pavilion, a Chinese pavilion at the beginning of the sacred way leading to the royal Ming tombs, Beijing

The Ming tombs, also known as the Thirteen Tombs, are a collection of tombs in a large building complex in the mountains just north of Beijing that house the remains of the Ming royal family. Built during the Ming period, the tumulus structures holding the remains of emperors and royal family members were built along the slopes of valleys and adjacent to structures that include halls, temples, gate towers, and barrel vaulted tunnels. One of the centerpiece structures include a colossal pavilion that contains four great archway entrances, four ceremonial columns, and the largest inscribed stele in China, built in 1420 and mounted on a sculpture of a stone tortoise. The sacred way winding through the tomb complex is lined with various stone statues depicting military and civil officials, horses, and mythological creatures, and leads to the ruins of bridges that are now partially destroyed.

== See also ==
- Ancient Chinese urban planning
- Ancient Chinese wooden architecture
- Architecture of the Song dynasty
- Caihua
- Culture of the Ming dynasty
- Economy of the Ming dynasty
- Government of the Ming dynasty
- History of the Ming dynasty
- List of Chinese inventions

== Sources ==
- Brook, Timothy (1998). The Confusions of Pleasure: Commerce and Culture in Ming China. Berkeley: University of California Press. ISBN 0-520-22154-0.
- Chen, Minhui; Wu, Zhanjing; Dong, Jinshuang (2025). "Dynamic Performance and Seismic Response Analysis of Ming Dynasty Masonry Pagodas in the Jiangnan Region: A Case Study of the Great Wenfeng Pagoda". Buildings. 15 (21): 3994 (1–21). doi:10.3390/buildings15213994.
- Needham, Joseph (1971). Science and civilisation in China, Vol. 4: Physics and Physical Technology, Part 3: Civil Engineering and Nautics (1978 Caves Books, Ltd. Reprint ed.). Cambridge: Cambridge University Press. ISBN 0-521-07060-0.
