= Ma Wan (painter) =

Chinese landscape painter and poet

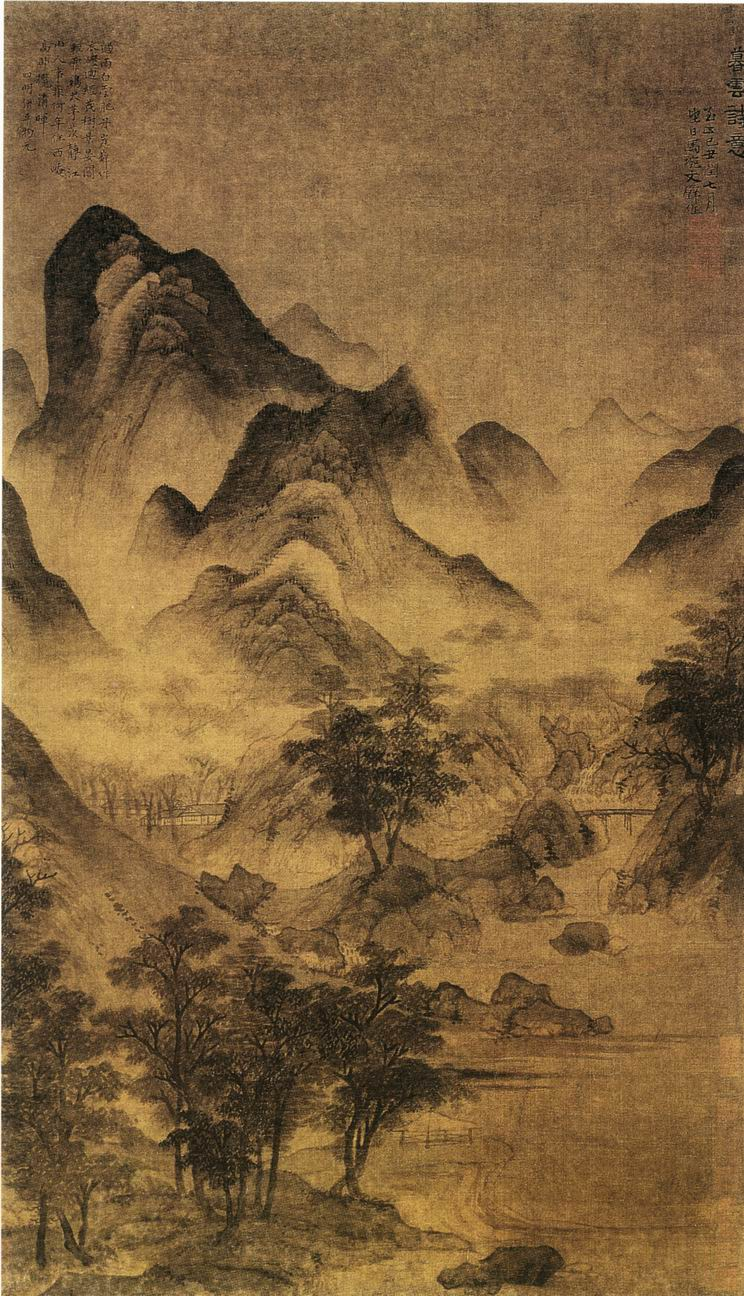
Ma Wan, Poetic Twilight Clouds, Shanghai Museum, 1349

Ma Wan (simplified Chinese: 马琬; traditional Chinese: 馬琬; pinyin: Mǎ Wǎn; Wade–Giles: Ma Wan) was a Chinese landscape painter, calligrapher, and poet during the Yuan Dynasty (1271–1368). His specific dates of birth and death are not known.

Ma was born in Jiangning (江宁; present-day Nanjing) and later lived in Songjiang. His courtesy name was Wenbi (文璧) and his pseudonyms were Ludunsheng (鲁钝生; lit. "Ungainly One") and Guanyuanren (灌园人; lit. "Garden Irrigation Person"). He was taught by Yang Weizhen. Ma's landscape painting followed the style of Huang Gongwang, utilizing a clear and faint touch.
