= Zhang Bi (calligrapher) =

Chinese calligrapher (1425–1487)

- 張弼
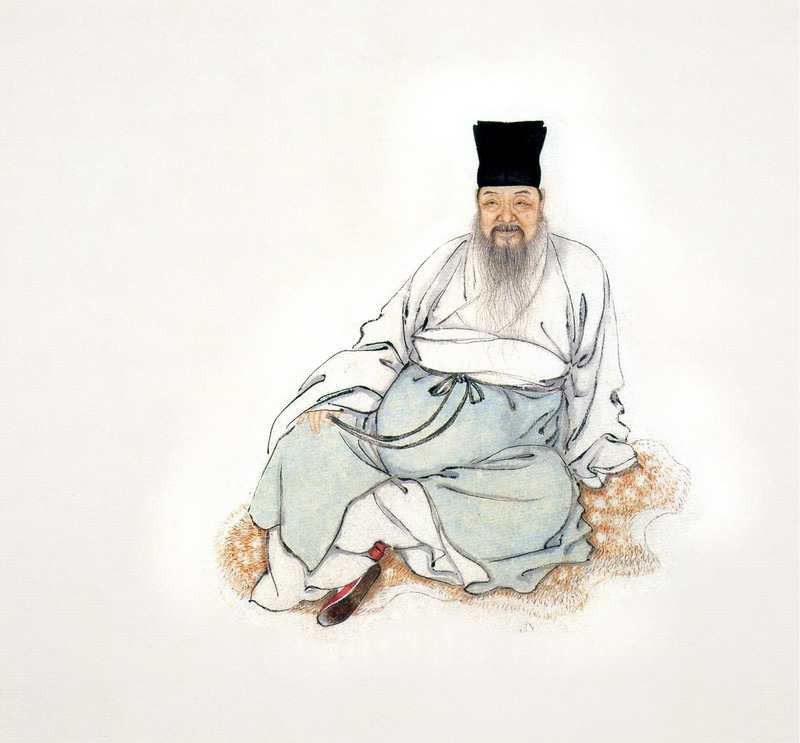
- Born: 1425; Huating, Shanghai
- Died: 4 July 1487 (aged 61–62)
- Education: jinshi degree (1466)

Signature
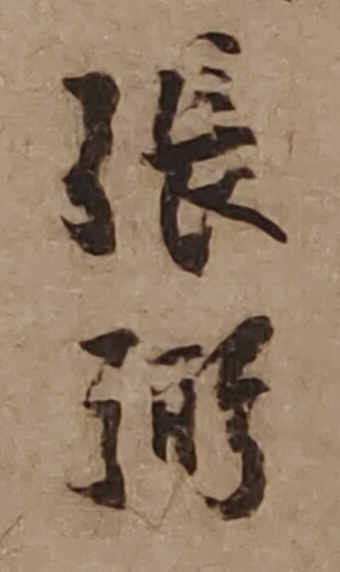

Zhang Bi
- Traditional Chinese: 張弼
- Simplified Chinese: 张弼
Transcriptions
Standard Mandarin
- Hanyu Pinyin: Zhāng Bì

Zhang Bi (Note: Zhang Bi used the courtesy name Rubi (汝弼) and the art name Donghai Jushi (東海居士).) (1425 – 4 July 1487) was a Ming dynasty Chinese calligrapher and poet noted for his cursive script.

== Biography ==
Zhang Bi was born in Huating County in Songjiang Prefecture (present-day, Huating is a town in Jiading District, Shanghai. He pursued a career in government by studying the Confucian classics. He excelled in the examination system, starting at the county level and eventually passing the provincial examinations in 1453. In 1466, he achieved the highest level of success by passing the palace examination in the capital and earning the degree of jinshi. He was appointed as a secretary at the Ministry of War and later became the deputy director of a department within the same ministry.

His straightforwardness and honesty caused the minister to dislike him, resulting in his transfer to the position of prefect in the remote mountain prefecture of Nan'an in the southwest of Jiangsu Province (present-day Dayu County in the city of Ganzhou). The region faced numerous issues, which the new prefect addressed by first suppressing banditry and then implementing measures to improve the local economy, such as constructing roads and bridges. Upon discovering the prevalence of unorthodox cults in the area, he ordered the demolition of over a hundred of their temples. In their place, he built Confucian schools and shrines dedicated to revered Confucian figures from the past. In 1484, he resigned due to poor health.

He was a prolific prose writer, poet, and respected calligrapher. According to his friend Li Dongyang, Zhang valued his poetry above his calligraphy and his prose above his poetry. Others primarily admired him for his calligraphy, particularly his "wild cursive script" in the style of Tang calligrapher Huaisu. His contemporaries saw the strong, energetic strokes of his handwriting as a reflection of his direct, independent, and morally steadfast character.

Two of his sons also achieved success in official service. Zhang Hongyi (張弘宜, jinshi 1481) rose to the position of deputy director of the provincial surveillance office in Guangxi and was also highly regarded for his calligraphy. Zhang Hongzhi (張弘至, jinshi 1496) served as the head of the supervisory office for one of the ministries.
