= Bian Jingzhao =

Chinese painter

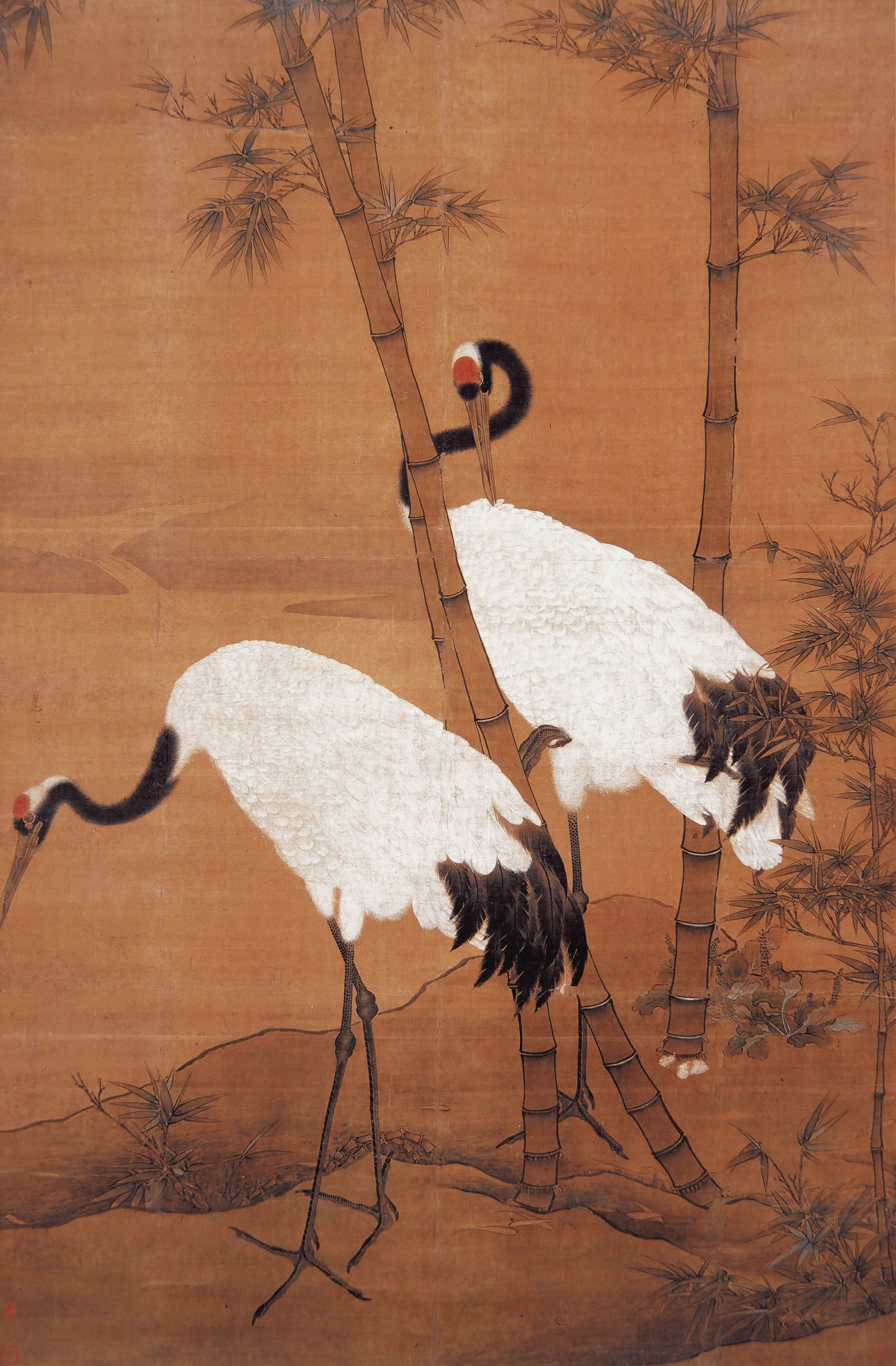
Bian Jingzhao, Bamboo and Cranes, Palace Museum, Beijing

Bian Jingzhao (simplified Chinese: 边景昭; traditional Chinese: 邊景昭), styled Wenjin (Chinese: 文進), was a famed Chinese painter in the early Ming dynasty. His birth and death years are unknown. He was born in Sanming, Fujian into a family of Longxi origin, and was active 1426–1435.

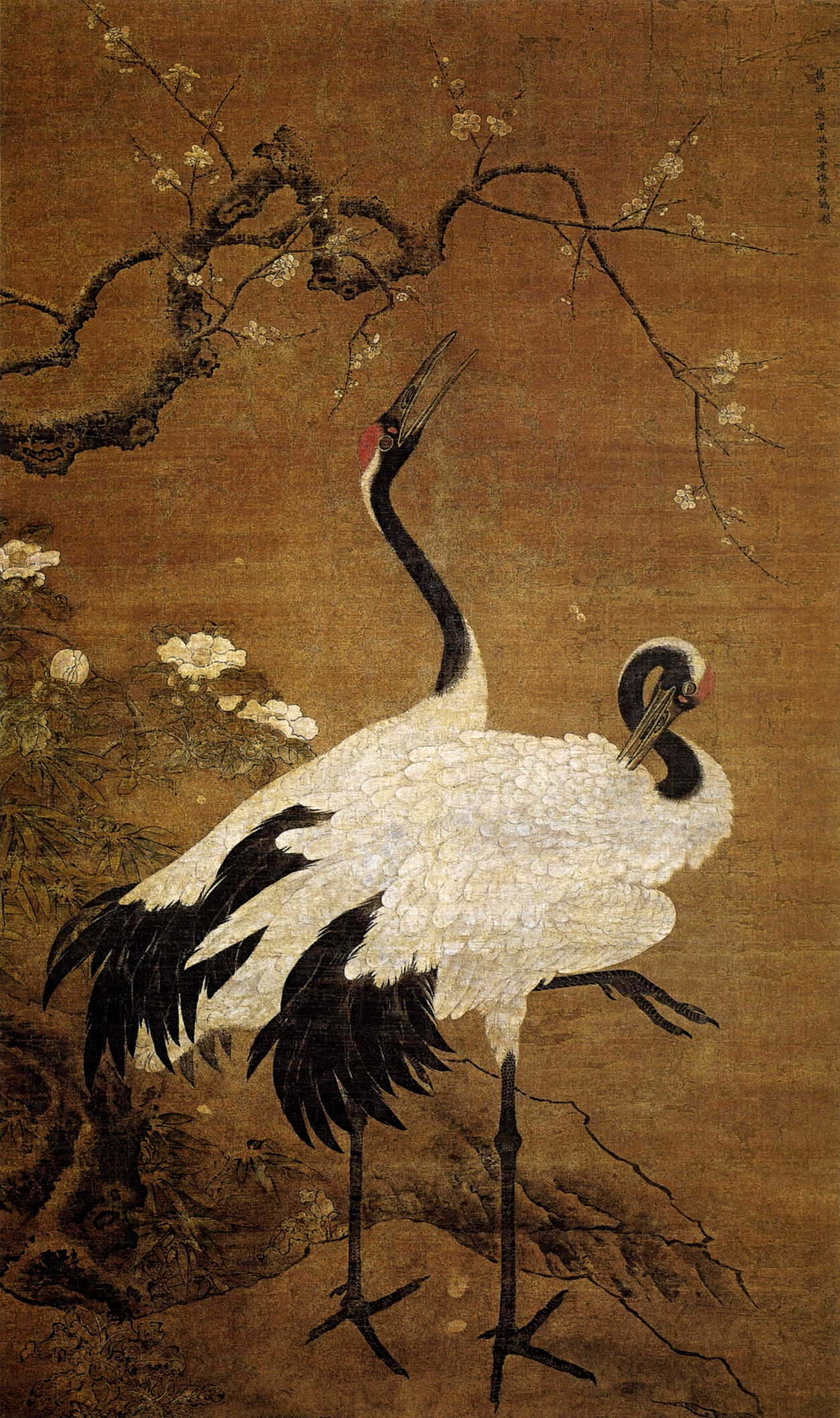
Snow Plum and Twin Cranes

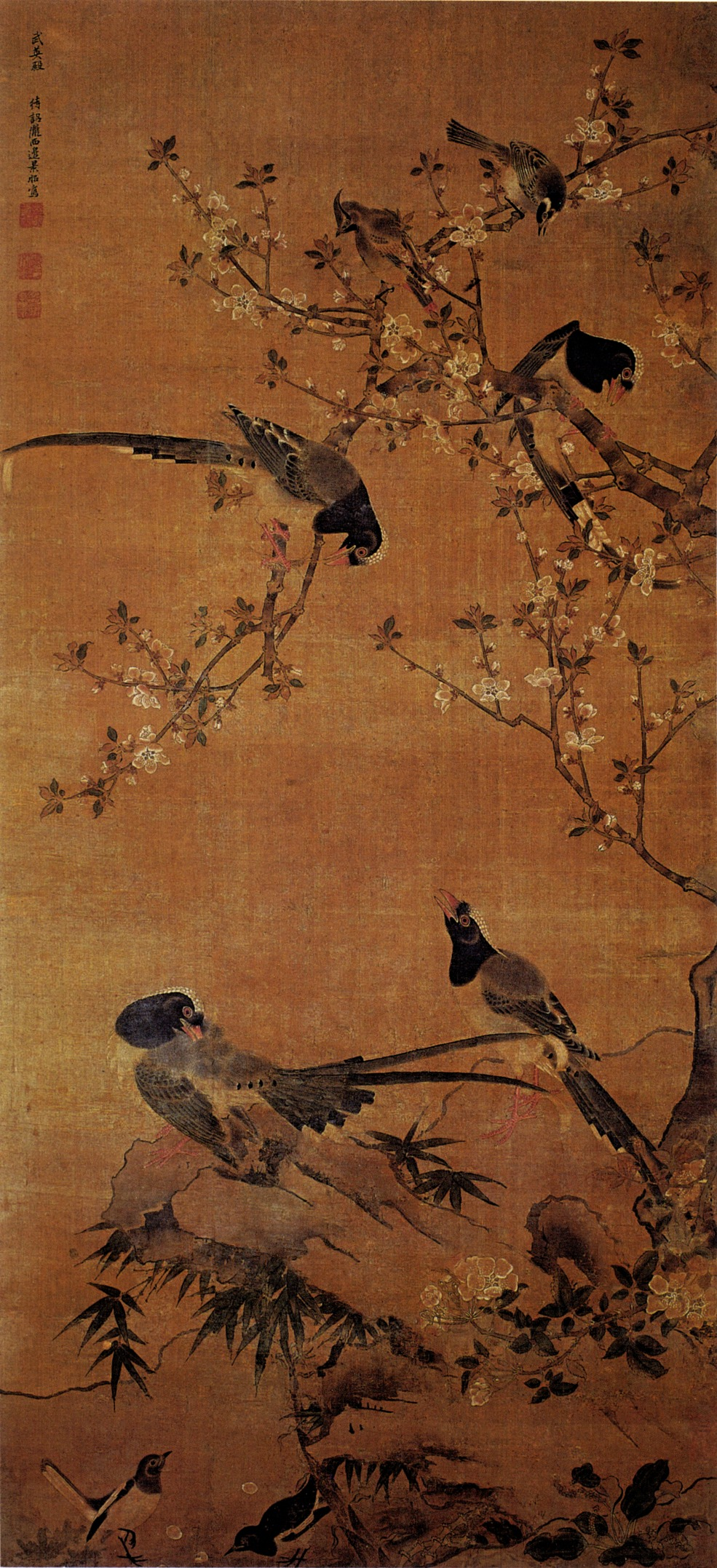
Birds Flocking at Flowers and Bamboo

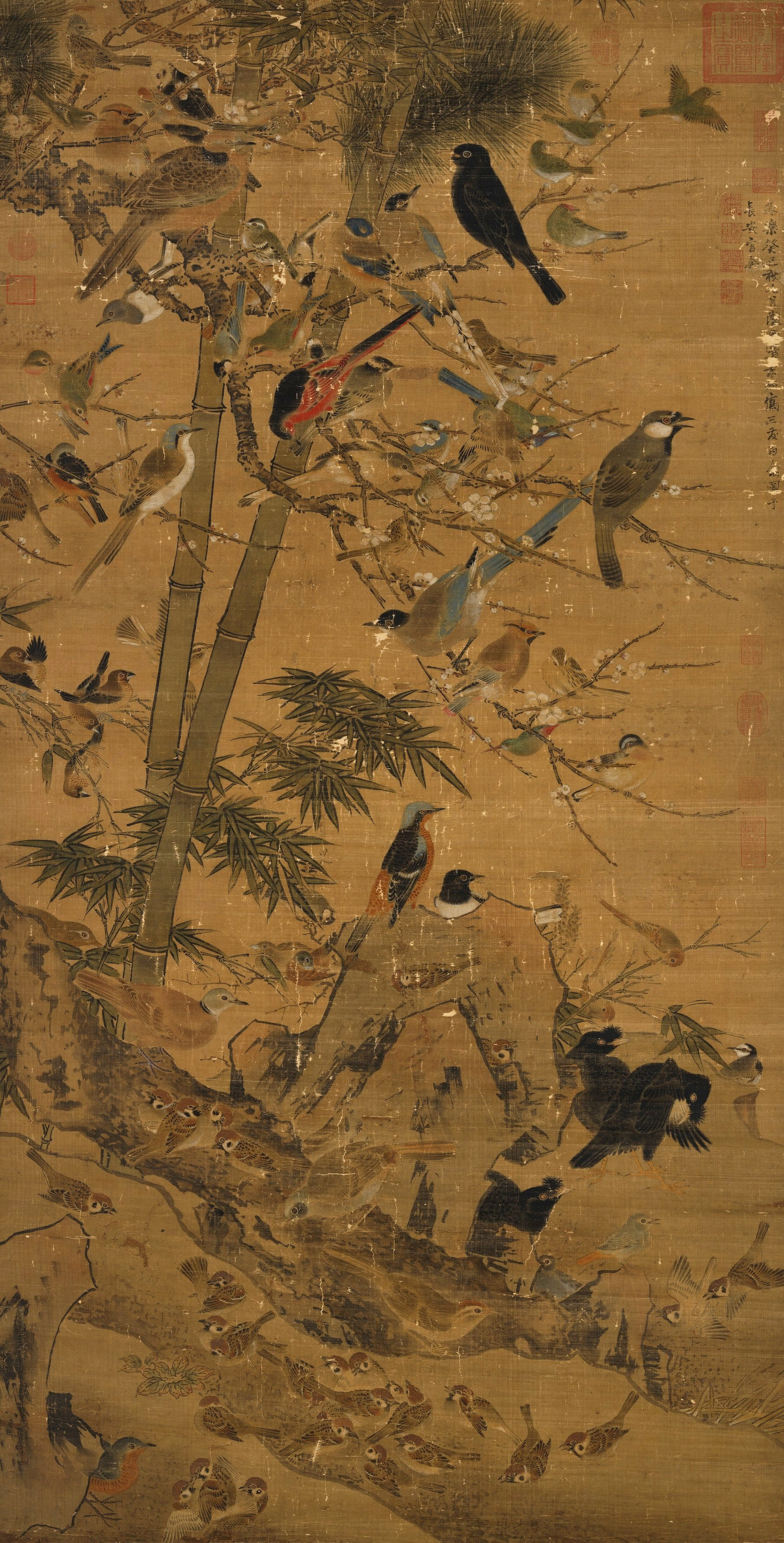
Three Friends and One Hundred Birds

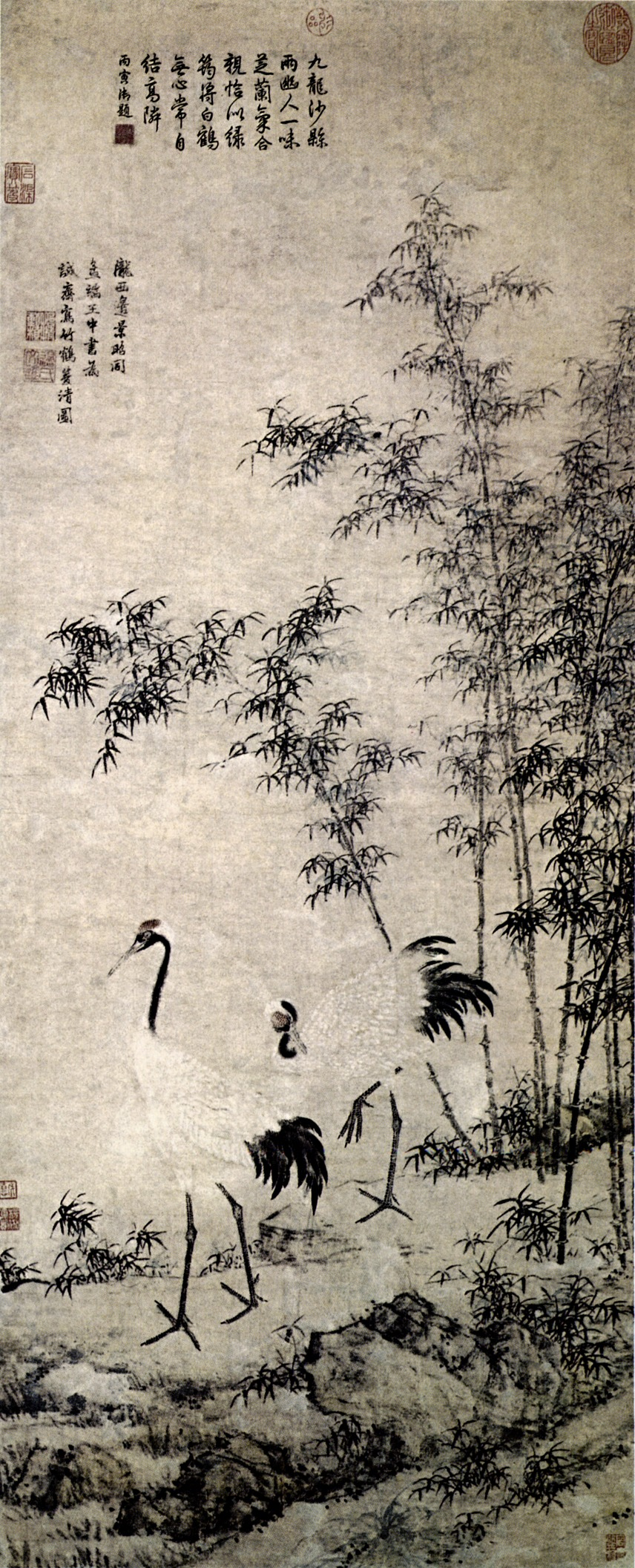
Bamboo and Cranes - Twin Clarity
