= Arif Dirlik =

Turkish historian (1940–2017)

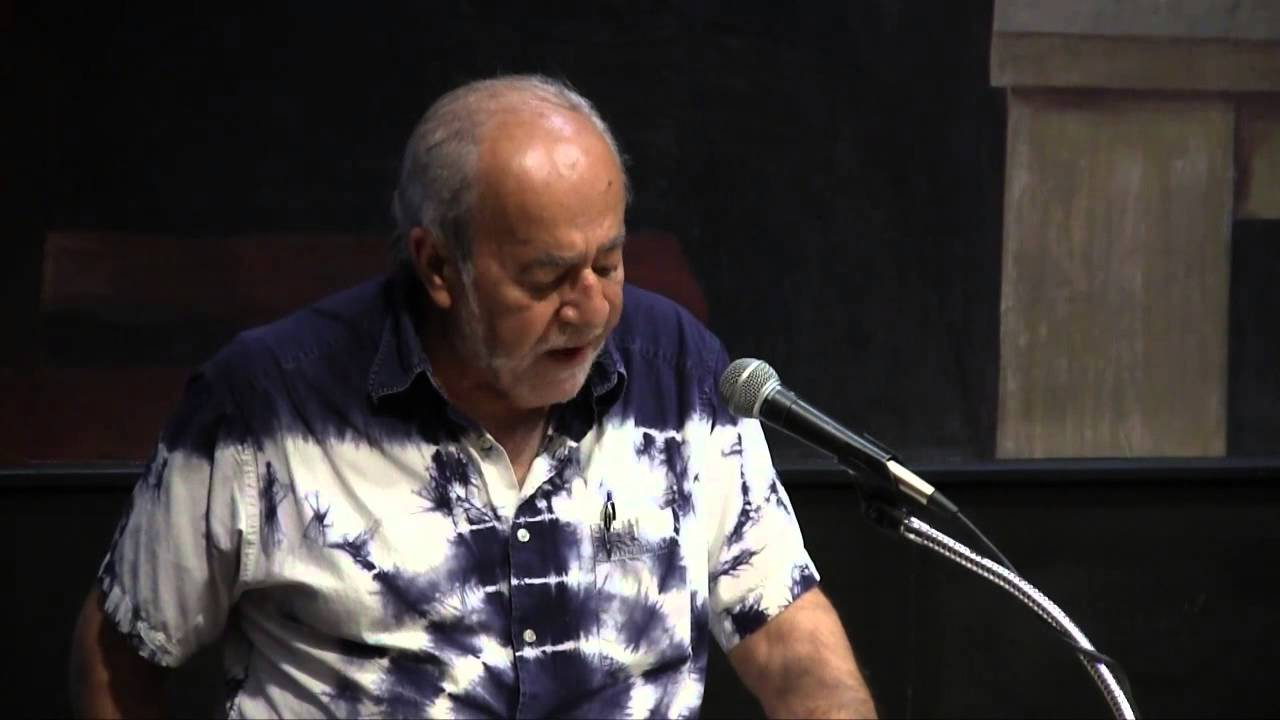
- Dirlik speaking at the New School in New York City in September 2014
- Born: November 23, 1940; Mersin, Turkey
- Died: December 1, 2017 (aged 77); Eugene, Oregon, United States
- Education: Robert College (BSc); University of Rochester (PhD)
- Scientific career
- Fields: History of China, postcolonialism, Marxism
- Workplaces: Duke University; University of Oregon; Centre for the Study of Developing Societies; University of British Columbia
- Thesis: Revolution and History: Debates on Chinese Social History, 1928–1933
- Doctoral advisor: Ralph Croizier

Arif Dirlik (/ˈɑːrifˈdiːrlik/; 23 November 1940 – 1 December 2017) was a Turkish-American historian who published on historiography and political ideology in modern China, as well as issues in modernity, globalization, and postcolonial criticism.

== Biography ==
Dirlik received a BSc in electrical engineering at Robert College, Istanbul in 1964 and came to the United States to study science at the University of Rochester, but developed an interest in Chinese history instead. He graduated with a PhD in history from the University of Rochester in 1973. His PhD dissertation on the origins of Marxist historiography in China, published by University of California Press in 1978, led to an interest in Chinese anarchism. When asked in 1997 to identify the main influences on his work, Dirlik cited Marx, Mao, and Dostoevsky.

Dirlik taught at Duke University for thirty years as Professor of History and Anthropology before moving in 2001 to the University of Oregon where he served as Knight Professor of Social Science, Professor of History and Anthropology, and Director of the Center for Critical Theory and Transnational Studies until his retirement in 2006.

He held visiting professor appointments at the University of British Columbia, University of Victoria (BC), University of California, Los Angeles, Ecole des Hautes Etudes en Sciences Sociales in Paris, the Hong Kong University of Science and Technology, and Soka University of America. He was honored with distinguished adjunct professorships at the Center for Marxist Social Theory of Nanjing University, Beijing University of Language and Culture, and the Northwest University for Nationalities in Lanzhou.

After his official retirement, Dirlik lived in Eugene, Oregon. In fall 2010, he became the Liang Qichao Memorial Distinguished Visiting Professor at Tsinghua University, Beijing. In fall 2011, he held the Rajni Kothari Chair in Democracy at the Centre for the Study of Developing Societies in Delhi, India. He held a brief appointment as Green Professor at the University of British Columbia in February 2016.

He served on the editorial boards of boundary 2, Interventions (UK), China Review (Hong Kong), Asian Studies Review (Australia), China Information (The Netherlands), China Scholarship (Beijing), Cultural Studies (Beijing), Inter-Asia Cultural Studies (Taiwan and Singapore), Norwegian Journal of Migration Research, Asian Review of World Histories (South Korea), Research on Marxist Aesthetics (Nanjing), Register of Critical Theory of Society (Nanjing), International Critical Thought (Beijing), Pasaj (Passages in Literature) (Istanbul), and Contemporary Chinese Political Economy and Strategic Relations: An International Journal (Malaysia).

He was the editor of two-book series, "Studies in Global Modernity" (SUNY Press) as well as co-editor of a series of translations from prominent Chinese official intellectuals, published by Brill Publishers in the Netherlands.

Dirlik's works have been translated into Chinese, Japanese, Korean, Turkish, Bulgarian, French, German and Portuguese.

== Positions and critiques ==
Dirlik took an engaged and critical approach to scholarship, oriented by "political relations and their social consequences" as well as "history as the search for universals". In his partner Roxann Prazniak's words, he "continued to the end to see Marxist historicism as the most compelling and comprehensive approach to understanding cultural entanglements in the political economy of global capitalism".

Dirlik spoke on his approach to history and the theoretical issues of historiography in a 2002 interview. As a "practicing historian" Dirlik said, "I continue to practice history not just because it is a way to make a living, which is an important consideration, but because I think that there is some value and meaning to historical understanding." He goes on to say that "I am also appalled at the arbitrary magisterial judgments on history encountered frequently in contemporary literature; a kind of licence that postmodernism seems to legitimize: since we cannot know anything, anybody can speak about everything."

The interview goes on to criticize the field of postcolonial studies, which he took up in such essays as "History Without a Center? Reflections on Eurocentrism," (Note: Interview in which Dirlik lays out his point of view.) Prasenjit Duara in 2001 replied to Dirlik's charge that diasporic scholars from the former British colonial world had used the concepts of "postcolonialism" to become embedded in Western academic "strongholds" and that they did not represent the majority of the population in their former countries. Likewise even a sympathetic review of the field objected to Dirlik's framing of post-colonial scholars as "agents of capital."

Dirlik was also critical of the "Beijing Consensus" which presented China's economic development model as an alternative—especially for developing countries—to the Washington Consensus. Dirlik argued that this "Silicon Valley model of development" ignores the fact that "the exploitation of China's labor force by foreign countries was a major part of the Chinese development."

Jerry Bentley's 2005 account in the journal World History provides a cogent summary of Dirlik's critiques of the field and his own disagreement. Dirlik, he says, has leveled a "challenging critique" of the field of world history, charging that it "naturalizes capitalist globalization by turning it into human fate" and that scholarship in the field "perpetuates Eurocentric knowledge even as it seeks alternatives to Eurocentric explanations of the global past." Bentley continues that Dirlik has identified genuine problems, but has "harnessed his scholarship to a political agenda." Dirlik "overstated the problems and overgeneralized his critique," falling into the "trap of an originary fallacy," in which he "confuses origin with fate," assuming that historical scholarship must inevitably follow lines established at the foundation."

Po-hsi Chen distinguishes two phases in Dirlik's intellectual work. He sees Dirlik's focus shifting around the time of his 1991 book Anarchism in Chinese Revolution from "historicizing earlier-generation Chinese Marxists and their revolutionary practices and theoretical reflections" towards a critique of "newly emergent postcolonial studies in North American academe as complicit with globalization and neoliberalism".

In his writing on the New Life Movement of Nationalist-era China, Dirlik described the reform's focus on hygiene was "an integral part of a comprehensive political outlook" despite its seeming banality. According to the political outlook of the time, China's national rejuvenation required a people who practiced the norms of cleanliness and ethics which the Nationalists deemed modern.

Writing on the Sinicization of Marxism, Dirlik states that "Mao [Zedong] did not reduce Marxism to a Chinese version or view China as merely another illustration of universal Marxist principles" but rather developed a view of Chinese Marxism that was simultaneously local and universal.

== Personal life ==
His closest academic collaborators included his mentor Harry Harootunian whom he befriended at Rochester, Maurice Meisner, and his partner Roxann Prazniak.

Dirlik married fellow historian Roxann Prazniak at the Duke Chapel in 1984. They both had children in previous relationships, one of whom is Dirlik's son Nick.

== Selected publications ==
Books

- 1978. Revolution and History: The Origins of Marxist Historiography in China, 1919–1937. Berkeley: University of California Press. 1978. ISBN 0520035410. (reprinted 1990).
- 1985. Culture, Society and Revolution: A Critical Discussion of American Studies of Modern Chinese Thought (Working papers in Asian/Pacific studies, 85-01), Durham, NC: Asian/Pacific Studies Institute, Duke University
- 1989. The Origins of Chinese Communism, New York: Oxford University Press.
- 1989. (edited, with Maurice Meisner) Marxism and the Chinese Experience: Issues in Chinese Socialism, Armonk, N.Y.: M. E. Sharpe
- 1991. Anarchism in the Chinese Revolution, Berkeley: University of California Press.
- 1991. (with Ming K. Chan) Schools into Fields and Factories: Anarchists, the Guomindang, and the National Labor University in Shanghai, 1927–1932, Durham: Duke University Press.
- 1993. (edited) What Is in a Rim? Critical Perspectives on the Pacific Region Idea, Boulder, CO: Westview Press ISBN 0813385318 (2nd edition 1998).
- 1994. After the Revolution: Waking to Global Capitalism, Hanover, NH: Wesleyan University Press.
- 1995. (edited, with Rob Wilson) Asia-Pacific as Space of Cultural Production, Durham, NC: Duke University Press
- 1997. The Postcolonial Aura: Third World Criticism in the Age of Global Capitalism, Boulder, CO: Westview Press.
- 1997. (edited, with Paul Healy and Nick Knight) Critical Perspectives on Mao Zedong's Thought, Atlantic Highlands, NJ: Humanities Press
- 2000. (edited, with Xudong Zhang) Postmodernism and China, Durham, NC: Duke University Press = special issue of boundary 2 (2.3)
- 2000. (edited, with Vinay Bahl and Peter Gran) History After the Three Worlds: Post-Eurocentric Historiographies, Lanham, MD: Rowman and Littlefield
- 2001. Postmodernity's Histories: The Past as Legacy and Project, Lanham, MD: Rowman and Littlefield.
- 2001. (edited, with Roxann Prazniak) Places and Politics in the Age of Global Capital, Lanham, MD: Rowman and Littlefield
- 2001. (edited) Chinese on the American Frontier, Lanham, MD: Rowman and Littlefield
- 2005. Marxism in the Chinese Revolution, Lanham, MD: Rowman and Littlefield.
- 2006. (edited) Pedagogies of the Global: Knowledge in the Human Interest, Boulder, CO: Paradigm Press
- 2007. Global Modernity: Modernity in the Age of Global Capitalism, Boulder, CO: Paradigm Press
- 2008. (edited) Snapshots of Intellectual Life in Contemporary PR China, Durham, NC: Duke University Press = special issue of boundary 2 (35.2)
- 2009. Kriz, Kimlik ve Siyaset: Küreselleşme Yazıları [= Crisis, Identity and Politics: Writings on Globalization], Istanbul: İletişim Yayınları
- 2011. (edited) The National Learning Revival, special issue of China Perspectives (85.1)
- 2011. Culture and History in Post-Revolutionary China: The Perspective of Global Modernity (The Liang Qichao Memorial Lectures), Hong Kong: Chinese University Press
- 2012. (edited, with Guannan Li and Hsiao-pei Yen) Sociology and Anthropology in Twentieth Century China: Between Universalism and Indigenism, Hong Kong: Chinese University Press
- 2012. (edited, with Roxann Prazniak and Alexander Woodside) Global Capitalism and the Future of Agrarian Society, Boulder, CO: Paradigm Publishers
- 2013. "Quanqiu xiandaixing zhi chuang: Shehui kexue wenji"(Windows on Global Modernity: Social Scientific Essays), Beijing: Zhishi chanquan chuban she
- 2017. Complicities: The People's Republic of China in Global Capitalism. Chicago: Prickly Paradigm Press.

Representative articles

- "Mirror to Revolution: Early Marxist Images of Chinese History," Journal of Asian Studies, 33.2 (February 1974), pp. 193–223, doi:10.2307/2052184
- "National Development and Social Revolution in Early Chinese Marxist Thought," The China Quarterly, Number 58 (April–June 1974), pp. 286–309, doi:10.1017/S0305741000011309
- "Mass Movements and the Left Guomindang," Modern China, 1.1 (January 1975), pp. 46–74, doi:10.1177/009770047500100102
- "The Ideological Foundations of the New Life Movement: A Study in Counterrevolution," Journal of Asian Studies, 34.4 (August 1975), pp. 945–980, doi:10.2307/2054509
- "The Problem of Class Viewpoint versus Historicism in Chinese Historiography," Modern China, 3.4 (October 1977), pp. 465–488, doi:10.1177/009770047700300410
- "Socialism Without Revolution: The Case of Contemporary China, Pacific Affairs, 54.4 (Winter 1981–1982), pp. 632–661, doi:10.2307/2757889
- "Chinese Historians and the Marxist Concept of Capitalism: A Critical Examination," Modern China, 8.1 (January 1982), pp. 359–375, doi:10.1177/009770048200800103
- "Spiritual Solutions to Material Problems: The 'Socialist Ethics and Courtesy Month' in China," South Atlantic Quarterly, 81.4 (Autumn 1982), pp. 359–375, doi:10.1215/00382876-81-4-359
- "The Predicament of Marxist Revolutionary Consciousness: Mao Zedong, Antonio Gramsci and the Reformulation of Marxist Revolutionary Theory," Modern China, 9.2 (April 1983), pp. 182–211, doi:10.1177/009770048300900202
- "The New Culture Movement Revisited: Anarchism and the Idea of Social Revolution in New Culture Thinking," Modern China, 11.3 (July 1985), pp. 251–300, doi:10.1177/009770048501100301
- — (1985). "The Universalisation of a Concept: 'Feudalism' to 'Feudalism' in Chinese Marxist Historiography". The Journal of Peasant Studies. 12 (2–3): 197–227. doi:10.1080/03066158508438268.
- "Culturalism as Hegemonic Ideology and Liberating Practice," Cultural Critique, Number 6 (Spring 1987), pp. 13–50, doi:10.2307/1354254
- "Postsocialism? Reflections on "Socialism with Chinese Characteristics"," Bulletin of Concerned Asian Scholars, 21.1 (January 1989), pp. 33–45
- (with Roxann Prazniak) "Socialism is dead, so why must we talk about it? Reflections on the 1989 insurrection in China, its bloody suppression, the end of socialism and the end of history", Asian Studies Review 14 (1990), pp. 3–25, doi:10.1080/03147539008712657
- "The Postcolonial Aura: Third World Criticism in the Age of Global Capitalism," Critical Inquiry, 20.2 (Winter 1994), pp. 328–356, doi:10.1086/448714
- — (1995). "Confucius in the Borderlands: Global Capitalism and the Reinvention of Confucianism" (PDF). Boundary 2. 22 (3): 229–273. doi:10.2307/303728. JSTOR 303728. Archived from the original (PDF) on September 30, 2024.
- "Asians on the Rim: Transnational Capital and Local Community in the Making of Contemporary Asian America," Amerasia Journal 22.3 (1996), pp. 1–24 doi:10.17953/amer.22.3.626172n811343982; reprinted in Jean Yu-wen Shen Wu and Thomas C. Chen (ed), Asian American Studies Now: A Critical Reader (Piscataway, NJ: Rutgers University Press, 2009)
- — (1996). "Chinese History and the Question of Orientalism" (PDF). History and Theory. 35 (4): 96–118. doi:10.2307/2505446. JSTOR 2505446. Archived from the original (PDF) on September 30, 2024.; reprinted in Edmund Burke and David Prochaska (eds.), Genealogies of Orientalism: History, Theory, Politics (Lincoln, NE: University of Nebraska Press, 2008), pp. 384–413
- — (1996). "Reversals, Ironies, Hegemonies: Notes on the Contemporary Historiography of Modern China". Modern China: 243–284. doi:10.1177/009770049602200301. S2CID 143775268.
- "The Past as Legacy and Project: Postcolonial Criticism in the Perspective of Indigenous Historicism," American Indian Culture and Research Journal, 20.2 (1996), pp. 1–31; reprinted in Kenneth Lincoln (ed.), Gathering Native Scholars: UCLA's Forty Years of American Indian Culture and Research (Los Angeles, CA: UCLA American Indian Research Center, 2009): 367–396
- "Mao Zedong and 'Chinese Marxism,'" in Indira Mahalingam and Brian Carr (eds), Companion Encyclopedia of Asian Philosophy (London: Routledge, 1997), pp. 536–561
- — (1999). "Is There History after Eurocentrism?: Globalism, Postcolonialism, and the Disavowal of History" (PDF). Cultural Critique (42): 1–34. doi:10.2307/1354590. JSTOR 1354590. Archived from the original (PDF) on September 30, 2024.
- "Place-Based Imagination: Globalism and the Politics of Place," Review (Fernand Braudel Center) 22.2 (Spring 1999), pp. 151–187 JSTOR 40241454
- — (1999). "How the Grinch Hijacked Radicalism: Further Thoughts on the Postcolonial" (PDF). Postcolonial Studies: Culture, Politics, Economy. 2 (2): 149–163. doi:10.1080/13688799989724. Archived from the original (PDF) on September 30, 2024.
- "Globalization as the End and the Beginning of History: The Contradictory Implications of a New Paradigm" (revised version), Rethinking Marxism 12.4 (Winter 2000), pp. 4–22, doi:10.1080/08935690009359020
- "Markets, Power, Culture: The Making of a 'Second Cultural Revolution' in China," Asian Studies Review 25.1 (March 2001), pp. 1–33, doi:10.1080/10357820108713293
- "Theory, History, Culture: Cultural Identity and the Politics of Theory in Twentieth Century China," in Institute of Modern History (Academia Sinica), China and the World in the Twentieth Century (2001), pp. 95–142
- "Colonialism, Globalization and Culture: Reflections on September 11," Amerasia Journal 27.3 (2001): 1–12, doi:10.17953/amer.27.3.11w5356035081841
- "Postmodernism and Chinese History," boundary 2, 28.3 (Fall 2001): 19–60, doi:10.1215/01903659-28-3-19
- — (2002a), "History without a Center? Reflexions on Eurocentrism", in Fuchs, Eckhardt; Stuchtey, Benedikt (eds.), Across Cultural Borders: Historiography in Global Perspective, Rowman & Littlefield, ISBN 978-0-7425-1768-4
- "Women and the Politics of Place: A Comment," Development 45.1 (2002): 14–18, doi:10.1057/palgrave.development.1110309
- "Modernity as History: Post-revolutionary China, Globalization and the Question of Modernity," Social History 27.1 (January 2002): 16–39, doi:10.1080/03071020110094183
- "Bringing History Back In: Of Diasporas, Hybridities, Places and Histories," Review of Education, Pedagogy, and Cultural Studies 21.2 (1999): 95–131, doi:10.1080/1071441990210202; reprinted in Elisabeth Mudimbe-Boyi (ed.), Beyond Dichotomies: Histories, Identities, Cultures and the Challenge of Globalization (Albany, NY: SUNY Press, 2002), pp. 93–127
- — (May 10, 2002), "Anarchism in East Asia", Encyclopædia Britannica, archived from the original on September 6, 2024
- "Empire? Some Thoughts on Colonialism, Culture and Class in the Making of Global Crisis and War in Perpetuity," Interventions 5.2 (2003): 207–217, doi:10.1080/1369801031000112941
- "Globalization and National Development: The Perspective of the Chinese Revolution," CR: The New Centennial Review, 3.2 (Summer 2003): 241–270, JSTOR 41949395; reprinted in Göran Therborn and Habibul H. Khondkher (eds.), Asia and Europe in Globalization: Continents, Regions and Nations (Leiden: Brill, 2006), pp. 123–150
- "Global Modernity? Modernity in an Age of Global Capitalism," European Journal of Social Theory #3 (August 2003): 275–292, doi:10.1177/13684310030063001
- "'Where Do We Go From Here? Marxism, Modernity and Postcolonial Studies," Diaspora 12.3, Winter 2003): 419–436, doi:10.3138/diaspora.12.3.419
- — (2004). "China's Critical Intelligentsia". New Left Review. 2 (28). (review of One China, Many Paths, ed. Chaohua Wang, Verso: London, 2003)
- — (2004). "American Studies in the Time of Empire". Comparative American Studies. 2 (3): 287–302. doi:10.1177/1477570004046771. S2CID 154790948.
- "Spectres of the Third World: Global Modernity and the End of the Three Worlds," Third World Quarterly, 25.1 (2004): 131–147, doi:10.1080/0143659042000185372
- "It is Not Where You Are From, It is Where You Are At: Place-Based Alternatives to Diaspora Discourse," in Jonathan Friedman and Shalini Randeria (eds.), World on the Move: Globalization, Migration and Cultural Security (London: I.B. Tauris, 2004), pp. 141–165
- "Architectures of Global Modernity, Colonialism and Places," Modern Chinese Literature and Culture, 17.1 (Spring 2005): 33–61, JSTOR 41490932
- "Globalization Now and Then: Some Thoughts on Contemporary Readings of Late 19th/Early 20th Century Responses to Modernity," Journal of Modern European History, 4.2 (2006): 137–156, doi:10.17104/1611-8944_2006_2_137
- "Beijing Consensus: Beijing Gongshi: Who Recognizes Whom and to What End," in Yu Keping, Huang Ping, Xie Shuguang and Gao Jian (eds.), Zhongguo moshi yu Beijing gongshi: chaoyue Huashengdun gongshi (= China Model and the Beijing Consensus) (Beijing: Shehui kexue wenxian chubanshe, 2006), pp. 99–112
- — (2006). "Performing the World: Reality and Representation in the Making of World History". Journal of World History. 16 (4): 391–410. doi:10.1353/jwh.2006.0016. S2CID 143606700.
- — (2006). "Timespace, Social Space, and the Question of Chinese Culture" (PDF). Monumenta Serica. 54: 417–433. doi:10.1179/mon.2006.54.1.023. S2CID 144947943. Archived from the original (PDF) on September 30, 2024.
- "Race-Talk, Race and Contemporary Racism," Publications of the Modern Language Association of America (PMLA), special issue, "Comparative Racialization," 123.5 (October 2008): 1363–1379, doi:10.1632/pmla.2008.123.5.1363
- "Colonialism, Revolution, Development: A Historical Perspective on Citizenship in Political Struggles in Eastern Asia," Development and Society 29.2 (December 2010): 187–210, JSTOR deveandsoci.39.2.187; reprinted in Kyung-Sup Chang, Bryan Turner (eds.) Contested Citizenship in East Asia: Developmental Politics, National Unity, and Globalization (London: Routledge, 2011)
- "Revisioning Modernity: Modernity in Eurasian Perspectives," Inter-Asia Cultural Studies, 12.2 (2011): 284–305, doi:10.1080/14649373.2011.554655; reprinted in Sven Trakulhun, Ralph Weber (eds.) Delimiting Modernities: Conceptual Challenges and Regional Responses (Lanham, MD: Lexington Books, 2015): 143–177
- "The Idea of a Chinese Model: A Critical Discussion" (expanded edition), China Information, 26.3 (November 2012): 277–302, doi:10.1177/0920203X12446289
- (with Roxann Prazniak), "Social Justice, Democracy and the Politics of Development: The People's Republic of China in Global Perspective," International Journal of China Studies (Malaysia), 3.3 (December 2012): 285–313
- "Transnationalization and the University: The Perspective of Global Modernity," boundary 2, 39.3 (Fall 2012): 47–73 doi:10.1215/01903659-1730617
- "Thinking Modernity Historically: Is "Alternative Modernity" the Answer?", Asian Review of World Histories, 1.1 (January 2013): 5–44, doi:10.12773/arwh.2013.1.1.005
- "Literary Identity/Cultural Identity: Being Chinese in the Contemporary World," Modern Chinese Literature and Culture (MCLC) Resource Center Publications (September 2013)
- "Developmentalism: A Critique," Interventions, 16.1 (2014): 30–48, doi:10.1080/1369801X.2012.735807
- — (2014), "Asia is Rising—But Where is it Going? Thoughts on an Emergent Discourse", Revista de Cultura. Edição internacional, 45: 12–31, ISSN 1682-1106, archived from the original on September 30, 2024

== Bibliography ==
- Bentley, Jerry H. (2005). "Myths, Wagers, and Some Moral Implications of World History". Journal of World History. 16 (1): 51–82. doi:10.1353/jwh.2005.0133. S2CID 143182385.
- Chen, Po-hsi (2021), "Sinified academic Marxism and Arif Dirlik's (self-)criticism of postcolonial studies", Inter-Asia Cultural Studies, 22 (4): 533–542, doi:10.1080/14649373.2021.1997413
- Dirlik, Arif (2002b). "Dirlik, Arif". In Xie, Shaobo; Fengzhen, Wang (eds.). Dialogues on Cultural Studies: Interviews with Contemporary Critics. University of Calgary Press. ISBN 978-1-55238-074-1.
- Duara, Prasenjit (2001). "Leftist Criticism and the Political Impasse: Response to Arif Dirlik's' How the Grinch Hijacked Radicalism: Further Thoughts on the Postcolonial'". Postcolonial Studies. 4 (1): 81–88. doi:10.1080/13688790120046898. S2CID 144706929.
- Loomba, Ania (1998). Colonialism-Postcolonialism. London; New York: Routledge. ISBN 0415128080.
- Morse, Chuck W. (2016). "Arif Dirlik: A Short Biography & Selected Works". Institute for Anarchist Studies. Perspectives on Anarchist Theory. 1 (2). Archived from the original on April 5, 2016.
- Prazniak, Roxann (2021a), ""Everyday I am Çapuling": Keeping Dirlik's theoretical history in focus", Inter-Asia Cultural Studies, 22 (4): 464–472, doi:10.1080/14649373.2021.1995187
- Prazniak, Roxann (2021b), "Photos of Arif Dirlik", Inter-Asia Cultural Studies, 22 (4): 609–618, doi:10.1080/14649373.2021.1995185
