= Starn =

Starn is a surname. Notable people with the surname include:

- Donald Starn (1902–1977), American football, basketball, and baseball player and coach and college athletics administrator
- Doug Starn (born 1961), American artist, artist duo and identical twin of Mike
- Mike Starn (born 1961), American artist, artist duo and identical twin of Doug
- Orin Starn (fl. from 1991), American anthropologist

== See also ==
- Stern (surname)
