= Gu Su =

Chinese political philosopher

Gu Su

Gu Su (Chinese: 顾肃; pinyin: Gù Sù, born April 1, 1955 in Jiangsu, China) is a Chinese liberal political philosopher and was professor of Philosophy and Law at Nanjing University, China. After graduating from Nanjing University, he studied at Duke University between 1983 and 1986. After then he taught at Nanjing university as a faculty member. His main work is Essential Ideas of Liberalism, published in China and Taiwan several times, introducing main ideas of liberalism and their implications to Chinese political and social practice. He has edited a series of books and written many articles in the national press, newspapers, magazines and journals on political and legal issues. He was a Liberal Arts Fellow at Harvard Law School, and a visiting scholar at both the London School of Economics and the University of Melbourne. He is member of editorial board of the journal NanoEthics.

Gu Su is now a professor and senior fellow of the IAS at Fudan University.

== Writings ==
Book chapters

- Gu Su (2010) Democratization: The Chinese Model and Course of Political Development in Yu Keping (2010) Democracy and the Rule of Law in China Leiden: Brill

Books:

- "Religion and Politics", Yi Lin Publisher, Nanjing, 2009
- "After the Republic", Jiangsu Fenghuang Publisher, Nanjing 2006
- "Essential Ideas of Liberalism", Central Bureau for Editing and Translation, Beijing, 2003
- "The 4th Scientific Revolution", Jiangsu Press, Nanjing, 2005
- "Reflection on Studying in America", Hubei Publishing House, Wuhan, 1999
- "In Search of Freedom and Justice--Reading John Rawls", Liaohai Press, Liaoning, 1999
- "Contemporary Western Social Trends of Ideas", Shandong Education Press, 2004
- "On Scientific Rationality", the Press of Social Sciences of China, Beijing, 1992
- "A History of Western Political and legal Thoughts", Nanjing Univ. Press Nanjing, 1993, Renmin University Press, 2005
- Series Books edited: "Political and Legal Philosophy", The Oriental Press, Beijing, 2002-now; "Successful Studies", Renmin University Press, Beijing, 2003-now; "University Books", The Oriental Press, Beijing, 2005-now
