= Luis Mariano Fernández Pimentel =

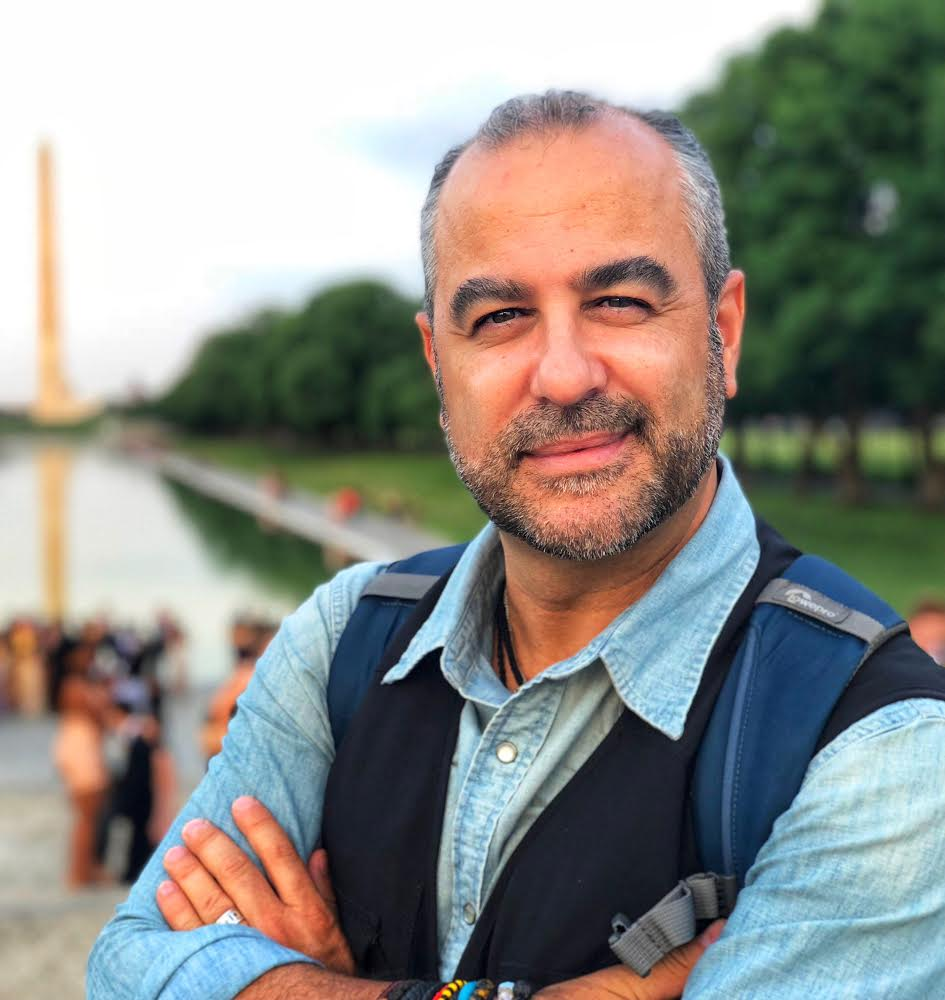
- Fernández at Washington DC in 2018
- Born: Luis Mariano Fernández Pimentel; 27 June 1972 (age 54); Ronda, Málaga
- Education: UNUS Universidad; CENEVAL y SEP
- Occupations: Investigative Journalist, Writer, TV Host
- Writing career
- Notable works: Mis enigmas favoritos, El viajero del alma, Conectando almas, El Camino Infinito

Luis Mariano Fernández Pimentel (born 27 June 1972) is a Spanish investigative journalist, writer and researcher of alleged enigmas and mysteries. He belongs to the International Federation of Journalists, the largest organization of journalist worldwide. He has been director of the television program of research and interviews "Mis Enigmas Favoritos" (English: My Favorite Riddles) on Mijas Comunicación, Digital Costa del Sol TV, Spain, weekly. This program was also aired on numerous Spanish and Latin American television channels.

== Education ==
Fernández has a degree in journalism and communication from UNUS Universidad in Tijuana, Mexico. He also holds a degree in journalism from the Secretaría de Educación Pública (SEP) of Mexico and from the Centro Nacional de Evaluación para la Educación Superior (CENEVAL). He is a clinical psychologist and psychotherapist, with a degree in psychology from HUMANITAS University in Mexico, and a Master's candidate in clinical and health psychology and cognitive behavioral therapy at ISEP, the Higher Institute of Psychological Studies in Spain.

== Career ==
Fernández began his career in 1990 at "Radio Costa del Sol", where he was a presenter and editor. Later he moved to "Cadena SER", where he was a reporter in such programs as "Milenio 3", "Ser Curiosos", "Espacio en Blanco". After that he moved to Mijas Comunicación. Here he served primarily as a presenter, hosting and directing "Mis Enigmas Favoritos" (1999–2014) in which he had the opportunity to interview J. J. Benítez, Fernando Jiménez del Oso, Robert Bauval, Antonio Piñero, among others. He subsequently hosted and create many other programs, such as "Noches casi Secretas" (2002–2014).

He published the book "Tumbas sin nombre" and "El misterio de las caras de Bélmez" with Editorial Edaf. In september 2021 published his first historical research novel, "El camino infinito". A story of love and magic at Camino de Santiago with Almuzara Libros.

In 2015, he relocated to Latin America, where he has worked on his own programs transmitted online. He is the presenter, editor and director for shows like "Mis Enigmas Favoritos", "El Viajero del Alma" and "Conectando Almas".
