= New Life Movement =

1930s Chinese civic campaign

The New Life Movement (Chinese: 新生活運動; pinyin: Xīn Shēnghuó Yùndòng; Wade–Giles: Hsin¹ Shêng¹huo² Yün⁴tung⁵) was a government-led civic campaign in the 1930s Republic of China to promote cultural reform and Neo-Confucian social morality and to ultimately unite China under a centralised ideology following the emergence of ideological challenges to the status quo. Chiang Kai-shek as head of the government and the Chinese Nationalist Party launched the initiative on 19 February 1934 as part of an anti-communist campaign, and soon enlarged the campaign to target the whole nation.

Chiang and his wife, Soong Mei-ling, who played a major role in the campaign, advocated a life guided by four virtues, lǐ (禮/礼, proper rite), yì (義/义, righteousness or justice), lián (廉, honesty and cleanness) and chǐ (恥/耻, shame; sense of right and wrong). The campaign proceeded with help of the Blue Shirts Society and the CC Clique within the Nationalist Party, and Christian missionaries in China.

== Historical context ==
In February 1934, Chiang Kai-shek launched the New Life Movement in Nanchang, Jiangxi, in an effort to unify China with a single ideology. The New Life Movement began at a time when China, already weakened by Western imperialism, faced the threats of rising Japanese militarism, domestic factionalism and communism. The launch of the New Life Movement was set in the context of the Chiangs' growing concern with corruption, and moral decadence that they blamed on foreign influences. Historian Colin Mackerras writes that "Corruption was an abiding feature of Chiang Kai-shek's rule" and that nepotism and bribery were rife among the bureaucracy. Chiang stated, "If we do not weed the present body of corruption, bribery, perfunctoriness, and ignorance, and establish instead a clean, effective administration, the day will soon come when the revolution will be started against us as we did the Manchus".

Chiang claimed that Chinese were "unbearably filthy", "hedonistic", "lazy", and physically and spiritually "decrepit", and thus leading lives that were "barbaric and devoid of reason." Among the anecdotes Chiang used to explain his launching of the movement was a time when he saw a ten-year-old child loitering and smoking. Chiang's political rival, Wang Jingwei described Chinese life as a life of "smoking," "sickness," "gambling," "filth," "ghosts" (i.e., superstition), and "indolence". Wang argued the fundamental psychological basis of such behaviour was "lackadaisicalness" (隨便主義, suibian zhuyi) and "self seekingness" (自理主義, zili zhuyi). He contended that "lackadaisicalness" led to lives without a sense of right or wrong, and hence with no distinctions or purpose. "Self-seekingness," he argued, led to the rejection of all outside interference with this kind of behaviour as encroachment on "freedom". There was no consideration for others and their rights, only of one's own comfort, inevitably obstructing social life and group solidarity.

In Chiang's mind, these concerns were compounded by the influx of foreign ideas following the New Culture Movement and May Fourth Movement which fostered Western concepts such as liberalism, pragmatism and nationalism as well as more radical ideas including Marxism respectively. The Movement attempted to counter such threats through a resurrection of traditional Chinese morality, which it held to more suitable to Chinese society to modern Western values. As such the Movement was based upon Confucianism, mixed with Christianity, nationalism, authoritarianism, and elements of fascism, which some saw as rejecting individualism and liberalism, while also opposing radical movements such as socialism and communism.

Soong Mei-ling called for a program of spiritual enlightenment. She wrote in Forum, an American magazine, in 1935, that "the mere accumulation of great wealth is not sufficient to enable China to resume her position as a great nation." There must be, she continued, "also revival of the spirit, since spiritual values transcend mere material riches. She played a major role both in launching the Movement and in representing its public face.

In 1936, Chiang appointed American Congregationalist minister George W. Shepherd to be the movement's directing chair. This was part of an effort to obtain support from American Protestants.

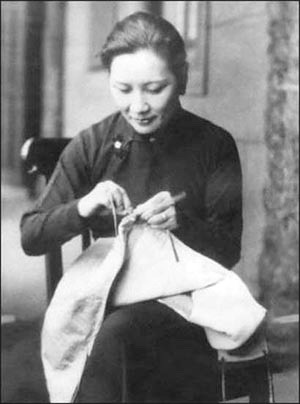
Soong Meiling stitching a uniform for soldiers

Soong Meiling insisted that while some puritanical Chinese politicians tried to co-opt the New Life Movement for their own ends, her husband made efforts to put an end to their activities. In her interview with Fulton Oursler, a famous American journalist who interviewed her in Shanghai regarding the Movement in August 1937, she stated that: "No. China would never take Fascism or any form of the totalitarian state. We can't ever be really regimented. Every Chinese is a personality. He will always think for himself. He has an ancient and magnificent culture, a sense of justice, a love of freedom. The New Life Movement has definitely rejected all forms of regimentation as being opposed to the principles of Dr. Sun Yat-sen and so betraying the people."

The New Life targeted the official, educated, and affluent classes in the belief that China's ills could be cured "by example and exhortation from above." This trickle-down philosophy of societal transformation neatly paralleled a Confucian belief: "The virtue of the gentleman is like wind; the virtue of the commoner is like grass. Let the wind blow over the grass and it is sure to bend." This concept of "salvation from within" was also purportedly on some level modeled on the Christian notion of changing the world by changing individuals.

Although Meiling acknowledged that the Blue Shirts were "stupid, overzealous, dizzy with success", she also stated that the government did not officially support most of their activities or condone their behavior. Several prominent figures within the KMT itself, however, also openly criticized the New Life Movement. Soong Chingling, Meiling's elder sister who long espoused socialist ideals in contrast with Meiling's more traditional Christian ones, dismissed the New Life Movement as a "pedantic" exercise that "gives nothing to the people" and that such profound emphasis on ancient Confucian ideals of proper behavior were largely impractical and ill-advised in a time when millions of Chinese families were still starving daily. She further argued that, "The aim of revolution is the material welfare of human beings...if that is not reached then there has been no revolution." Their essential differences, with Chingling focusing mostly on the Chinese people's considerable material necessities, and Meiling on what she saw as their people's lofty spiritual needs, contributed to the rift between the two once-close sisters, which eventually led to Chingling leaving the KMT entirely and joining the Chinese Communist Party (CCP).

The leading prominent liberal voice in the KMT, Hu Shih, stated that as "there is neither any panacea to save the country nor will there be any miracle cure to revive the nation", the problems that the Movement sought to address were indeed considerable and prevalent, but Chiang's methods of countering them were much less valid, and that the ROC should focus on renewing the material well-being of the Chinese people before trying to revive their so-called spirituality. According to Hu Shih, "When children were scouring rubbish dumps to find half a burnt-out coal, or a bit of filthy rag, how could you accuse them of dishonesty if they pocketed a lost item they had picked up? The first responsibility of the government is to make sure the average man can live a decent life… To teach them how to lead this so-called new life can only be the last thing."

James Gareth Endicott, who served as Meiling's New Life Movement adviser and had a close relationship with her, protested to Meiling about what he saw as the KMT's drift towards non-liberal ideologies, feeling that she was perhaps among the more reasonable members of the Nationalist government. Although Endicott supported some aspects of the Movement, he disagreed that it should be involved in the government. After she urged him to share his growing concerns with Chiang personally, Endicott brusquely told Chiang that if he failed to base the government's domestic policies on the needs of the people, including instituting agrarian reform, then revolutionary forces would eventually rise against him. Chiang replied that while he had plans for land reform, he could not carry them out "while there are so many Communists around to take advantage of it", ending their discussion after a heated exchange.

Chiang's original inception of the New Life Movement purportedly stemmed from his personal negative experiences in both the Soviet Union and in the CCP-controlled parts of China, where he became repulsed by their harsh reality of class struggle. "The poor were told it was right to rob the rich; employees were encouraged to betray or even kill their employers; children were urged to denounce their parents. To Chiang, these 'struck at all the fundamental principles' of traditional Chinese ethics. He took it upon himself to resurrect the ethics of old China, in which loyalty and honour were essential."

== Doctrines and principal beliefs ==
The movement drew on multiple conceptions of modernity.

Chiang Kai-shek's September 1934 speech stated that the New Life Movement aimed at the "promotion of a regular life guided by the four virtues," – 'Lǐ' (proper rite), Yì' (righteousness or justice), lián (honesty and cleanness) and chǐ (shame; sense of right and wrong). These virtues, he went on,

must be applied to ordinary life in the matter of food, clothing, shelter, and action. The four virtues are the essential principles for the promotion of morality. They form the major rules for dealing with men and human affairs, for cultivating oneself and for adjustment to one's surroundings. Whoever violates these rules is bound to fail, and a nation that neglects them will not survive."

Chiang later extended the four virtues to eight by the addition of "Promptness", "Precision," "Harmoniousness," and "Dignity". These elements were summarized in two basic forms: "cleanliness" and "discipline" and were viewed as the first step in achieving a "new life". People were encouraged to engage in modern polite behaviour, such as not to spit, urinate or sneeze in public. They were encouraged to adopt good table manners such as not making noises when eating. Nearly 100 such rules governed everyday life.

The New Life Movement promoted cremation as a modern, rational, and hygienic alternative to traditional funerals.

=== Women's issues ===
The New Life Movement opposed the liberalising stance on women's issues of the earlier May Fourth Movement.

Soong urged women to reform the family and to serve the broader needs of society in China.

The movement's women's journal, Women's New Life Movement Monthly, ran from November 1936 to June 1937. It sought to tie the ideas of motherhood, particularly the image of a "super wise wife and good mother" to nationalism. The Movement contended that to be virtuous, women should return to the home.

== Influences on the Movement ==
The ideological strictness of the New Life Movement had many similarities with Neo-Confucianism, which had been the dominant moral philosophy of previous centuries. The New life Movement "four virtues" were taken from Confucian school of thought. Paul Linebarger had stated that the New Life Movement's "principles consist of a simple restatement of the cardinal Confucian personal virtues, interpreted to suit modern conditions."

The historian Lloyd Eastman saw Chiang's goal as unifying China under a singular ideology, a fascist one at that, with the resulting New Life Movement being a popularized or a "sloganized Confucianism". According to Keith Schoppa, the new set of beliefs was seen to be easy to execute, with four main virtues backed by 95 further sub-rules that regulated the everyday life of the regular Chinese citizen.

The Movement's call for women to return to the home as virtuous wives and good mothers was in part influenced by Nazi Germany and Fascist Italy's restraints on women's employment.

The Movement was also shaped by Chiang's Christianity. According to Elmer Clark, the new doctrine was "an ambitious moral and ethical enterprise which proposed nothing less than a Chinese renaissance, a complete reformation of the habits, customs and manners of one fourth of the human race, to bring them more in line with the accepted morals of Christian civilisation". Overlapping moral guidelines exist between Confucianism and Christianity. The 95 rules placed in the New Life movement often blur the lines between the influence of the two on the Movement, such as "do not gamble" or "be polite and courteous to women and children".

This Movement has also been accused of totalitarianism. Dirlik sees the movement as a "modern counterrevolution" opposed to an "anti-revolutionary conservatism" due to the fact that it instrumentalised traditional moral codes and societal constructs. Some historians regard this movement as imitating Nazism and regarded this movement as being a neo-nationalistic movement used to elevate Chiang's control of everyday lives. Frederic Wakeman described the New Life Movement as "Confucian fascism". Historian Maggie Clinton likewise characterizes the movement as fascist. Other historians, however, have argued that the New Life Movement was a flawed, overidealistic and puritanical movement, rather than a fascist mass movement.

== Reception ==
Despite the grandiose goal of revitalising and revolutionising China, the New Life Movement ultimately ended in failure as both domestic and foreign reception remained paltry throughout the duration of the movement. The combination of the movement's inability to formulate a systematic ideology and the seeming banality of its concerns caused both Chinese and foreign commentators to ignore the significance of New Life ideology and intentions and instead to stress the more superficial aspects of the movement. Consequently, the movement was approached variously as a joke, or to those taking it more seriously, a shallow and antiquated regression to Chinese tradition when tradition had already proved incapable of solving China's problems. Historian Suzy Kim summarizes its failure as due to a "lack of cohesion."

The Movement's inability to formulate a systematic ideology and abstract code of ethics contrasted sharply with the promises of the CCP, which spoke sharply and to the point on taxation, distribution of land and the disposition of overlords. From the perspective of some impoverished Chinese citizens, the policies of Marxists were far more practical and coherent, leading to the lack of significance attributed to the New Life Movement. On a Western perspective, Chiang's complex code of ethics was far too abstract and lacking in action to be useful or pragmatic, perceived as being superficial and inordinately idealistic.

The lack of popular domestic reception is exacerbated by the behaviour of the Blue Shirts, a far-right fascist group that enforced the rules of the New Life Movement. Historian Sterling Seagrave writes "by 1936, the Blue Shirts were running amok, driven by excesses of zeal and brutality, giving the New Life Movement a bad name". The Literary Digest observed that year, 'Most likely to upset the teacups were Chiang's own civilian, anti-foreign, bombing, stabbing, shooting 'Blue Shirt' terrorists, who once useful, now unmanageable, have become something of a Frankenstein monster." The association of the violent and repressive behaviour of the Blue Shirts compounded the less than enthusiastic reception of the Movement, further attributing to it a negative reputation as well.

The New Life Movement's ideas about women's place in the home as "wise wives and good mothers" were opposed by various contemporaries. A feminist-oriented group of women activists within the KMT responded to the idea by asserting that Confucianism required gender reciprocity and that both men and women should cultivate the virtues needed for a healthy family and strong society. Communist writers contended that the New Life Movement's attempt to return women to the home was a Hitler-esque attempt to control women and that by pushing women into the home at a time of national crisis, the New Life Movement's stance on women served the interests of foreign imperialism.

Other historians assert that the New Life Movement was not without its merits and positive values either, although they also concede it was not able to offset the KMT's painstaking struggle to resolve China's deep-rooted and complex socioeconomic problems.

According to Jonathan Fenby, "Many New Life rules were eminently sensible, such as those advocating healthy living, cleanliness, vaccination, and the killing of flies and mosquitoes. Compared to attempts to re-educate and dragoon the Chinese people by Chiang's Communist successor, the movement was positively benign. But, in a country with problems on the scale of those faced by China, the initiative was like the admonitions of a frustrated father wagging his finger at his unruly children. The message never reached the bulk of illiterate peasants, who were, in any case, more concerned with survival than with wearing their hats straight. Being told to eat in silence and go to bed early could only make the modern-minded urban elite regard the regime as a bunch of petty busybodies." Fenby also notes that modern-day China itself has also tried similar government-sponsored efforts to encourage the Chinese people to "behave better", citing the Public Morality Day of autumn 2003 as "a loud echo of the New Life movement."

Rana Mitter commented that, "Despite its anti-communism, it shared many values and assumptions with the CCP, with its stress on frugality and collective values. Yet it never had much success. While China suffered from a massive agricultural and fiscal crisis, prescriptions about clothes and orderly behaviour did not have much popular traction." He also asserted that contemporary China has consciously or not imitated many aspects of the New Life Movement in recent years, pointing to Chinese society, where points are given by local committees to residents who throw away their garbage and put out plants to decorate their houses. In the run-up to the Olympics, Beijing residents were told of a new 'morality evaluation index' which would give credit for 'displays of patriotism, large book collections, and balconies full of potted plants' and lower grades for 'alcohol abuse, noise complaints, pollution, or a violation of licences covering internet cafes and karaoke parlours'. Public toilets in tourist areas are also being upgraded and star-rated."

Jay Taylor argues that Chiang's motives for launching the New Life Movement were overall understandable given China's dire situation at the time, even if it did not achieve the results that many had hoped or imagined, nor did Chiang really seek to use the Movement itself to engage in imperialism, but to address legitimately overwhelming issues in Chinese society: "The values that the movement sought to inculcate were mostly simple neo-Confucian merits and traditional Japanese habits—frugality and conscience, simplicity, honesty, and even promptness, hygiene, and neatness. For critics, the disturbing aspect of the movement was its intention to "thoroughly militarize the lives of the citizens of the entire nation." Yet the purpose of this "complete militarization" was not to conquer other people but to cultivate "courage and swiftness, the endurance of suffering, a tolerance of hard work, especially the habit and ability of unified action." The aim was to say "farewell to yesterday's barbarian way of life, its disorderliness, lethargy, and depression." These were hardly objectionable goals, especially when framed in the innocent bromides of Confucius and Christ." He also notes that Chiang developed deep personal reservations regarding the Blue Shirts, having mused in a letter to the newspaper 'Dagongbao, "How would I differ from the Communists...if I were to imitate the so-called fascists...of Italy?" and by mid-1934, had become "thoroughly disillusioned with the organization". Unlike the Brown Shirts, who numbered two million and functioned as Hitler's private paramilitary around the same time period, the exclusive Blue Shirts had only about three hundred official members when it finally disbanded in 1938.

Federica Ferlanti notes that for all its shortcomings, the New Life Movement was nevertheless able to help rally considerable number of ordinary Chinese people to the anti-Japanese war effort, particularly urbanite Chinese women, who in one instance helped raise an "extraordinary amount of money during the New Life Movement Fifth Anniversary fund-raising campaign of 1939." She further states that "the involvement of civil servants through the New Life Movement wartime campaigns prevented the disintegration of society and administrative institutions under the impact of the war in the first phase of the conflict" and that in conclusion, "the complex network of New Life Movement organisations in the administrative structure helped stabilise the Nationalist state during the first years of the war, and the involvement of civil servants tempered the centrifugal drifting of the administrative institutions."

== Implementations ==
The New Life Movement aimed to control Chinese lifestyles.

The early practical measures of the movement sought emphasized hygiene. Measures grouped around the idea of hygiene included "mental hygiene," public cleanliness and etiquette, militaristic discipline, and moral cultivation.

Regarding mental hygiene, the movement sought to eliminate conditions deemed as "abnormal mindsets," which included both clinical conditions and social deviance such as flouting systems of authority. Chiang's view of mental hygiene drew from the Neo-Confucian text Great Learning (Daxue) and which emphasized "rectifying the mind", "cultivating the self," "ordering of the state," and more. According to academic Stephanie M. Wong, Chiang interpreted the Confucian connections between moral cultivation and a well-functioning society "in a distinctly modernistic way, positing a direct connection between psychological fortitude and state security. The Nationalists saw the creation of a mentally sound and compliant citizenry as a prerequisite for a fully functional nation."

Regarding public health, etiquette, and social niceties, Chiang in 1934 published the Outline of the New Life Movement and Necessary Knowledge for Life in major newspapers. These recommended behaviors like cleanliness, sobriety, table manners, home cleaning, observing national holidays, avoid gambling, avoiding spitting, and singing the national anthem properly. Campaigns carried out by regional New Life offices addressed behaviors like spitting, smoking, urinating, and defecating in public. According to academic Arif Dirlik, this reform was "an integral part of a comprehensive political outlook" despite its seeming banality. In this view, national rejuvenation required a people who practiced the norms of cleanliness and ethics which the Nationalists deemed modern.

The movement sought to militarize society to make it more orderly. In one of the initial speeches launching the movement, Chiang stated, "What is the New Life Movement that I am promoting now? To put it simply, it is to completely militarize the life of all people throughout the nation! To develop brave, efficient, hardworking qualities, and especially the ability to endure hardships, so that the people will be ready to sacrifice their lives for the nation."

Task forces were created in different regions to implement the movement, yet, in reports from some districts on the implementation, the movement was seen to be severely underfunded, understaffed and poorly understood by law enforcement officials.

As part of the New Life Movement, law enforcement police sometimes inspected people's homes for cleanliness. Concerned by these practices, Wang Jingwei in 1934 sought to persuade Chiang to rely less on coercive measures, contending, "Morality sets the highest standards, but the law should only enforce the minimum standard." Chiang partially accepted this perspective, announcing a modification to the movement's implementation whereby the state would less directly intervene in common people's homes and bodies, and would focus more on government employees, soldiers, and students before expanding to the common people more gradually.

The Blue Shirts were also instrumental in the implementation of the New Life movement. The neo-right wing group at first sought to correct the behaviour of those not following the four virtues and the further 95 rules placed. However, they soon turned to force to reinforce Chiang's ideals, giving bad publicity and views on the movement. The excessive violence used by the Blue Shirts encompassed the movement, leading to a reluctant public in following the new dogma in place by the KMT.

The New Life Movement's tradition continued in post-Civil War Chinese Nationalist Taiwan, in the form of mass campaigns to enforce social habits such as queuing in line, short haircuts, or ending public spitting, littering, and destruction of public property.

== Historical evaluations ==
In the words of Soong Mei-ling's biographer, the New Life Movement was a "curious East-West ideological fusion of neo-Confucian precepts, thinly disguised, New Testament Christianity, YMCA-Style social activism, elements of Bushido—the samurai code—and European fascism, along with a generous dose of New England Puritanism." She concluded that, "In reality, the real and lasting impact of the New Life Movement on Chinese society was limited. Albeit noble, its battle against the immemorial ills of Chinese life—gambling, opium, debauchery, poverty, begging, robbery, filth, corruption, and indifference to the public good amounted to tilting at windmills. A mass movement that rejected popular initiative, New Life tried to imbue the public with a political consciousness while denying it a political voice." Arif Dirlik explains the Movement as motivated by the need to counter Chinese Communist Party (CCP) successes in both ideological appeal and political organization.

Historian Suzy Kim contrasts the New Life Movement with the later Cultural Revolution. While both movements had superficial similarities in terms of changing everyday behavior, "The New Life Movement sought to expand the power of the state and was instituted from the top down for the purposes of mobilizing people around its own agenda as a form of 'controlled popular mobilization,' whereas the Cultural Revolution was a bottom-up movement that periodically escaped control of the state[.]"

According to American professor and political scientist A. James Gregor, who disputes other historians' critical assessment of the Movement, "In effect, there was nothing in the New Life Movement that was specifically fascist. Certainly the Chinese Marxists did not so characterize it when it first manifested itself in early 1934. In fact, for a very long time Chinese Marxists did not identify 'fascism' in the political activities of the Kuomintang, even though as early as 1928 they conceived its suppression of CCP activities in China as part of a program of "White Terror." Encyclopedia Britannica describes the movement as "a program that sought to halt the spread of communism by teaching traditional Chinese values".

According to Hans van de Ven, "Although it is easy to lampoon the New Life Movement – as indeed it was at the time – it has had a long influence. Even today many schools and offices in China display 'civility certificates' in the same way that those in the West display hygiene and health and safety certifications. Today, CCP general secretary Xi Jinping's administration has again imposed limits on entertainment allowances and continues to campaign against extravagance. New Life ideals have sufficiently broad appeal that their promotion bolsters the standing of those in power. He also points to the Hunan peasant revolution in 1927, in which former CCP leader Mao Zedong noted that "they [the peasantry] were eradicating the old China's vices of gambling, opium-smoking, vulgar opera performances, superstition, excessive feasting and banditry", through which Mao defended the use of extreme force to end what he saw as corrupt and harmful practices. Mao himself eventually implemented the 'Three Rules of Discipline' (obedience to orders, no confiscations of peasant property and the prompt surrender to higher authority of all things taken from landlords) and 'Eight Points of Attention' (politeness, honesty, courtesy to women and so on) in an effort to make Chinese soldiers aspire to higher standards of behavior.

== Cultural references ==
Xinsheng Road, a major arterial road in Taipei, is named after the movement.

== See also ==
- Anti-communism in China
- History of the Republic of China
- Chiang Kai-shek
- Chinese Cultural Renaissance
- Rural Reconstruction Movement

== References and further reading ==
- Chiang, Kai-shek (1934), "On The Need For a New Life Movement" (Speech 1934) (PDF), reprinted Columbia University – East Asian Curriculum Project
- DeBary, Wm. Theodore, ed. (2000). Sources of Chinese Tradition: From 1600 through the Twentieth Century. Vol. II. New York: Columbia University Press. ISBN 0231-11271-8.
- Dirlik, Arif (1975), "The Ideological Foundations of the New Life Movement: A Study in Counterrevolution", Journal of Asian Studies, 34 (4): 945–980, doi:10.2307/2054509, JSTOR 2054509, S2CID 144316615
- Eastman, Lloyd (1974). The Abortive Revolution: China under Nationalist Rule, 1927-1937. Cambridge, Mass.: Harvard University Press. ISBN 0674001753.
- Fenby, Jonathan (2008). Chiang Kai Shek - China's Generalissimo and the Nation He Lost. OUP Oxford. ISBN 9780786739844.
- Heinrichs, Maurus (1936), "Vita nova et vita christiana", Collectanea Commissionis Synodalis, 9 (1): 39–69
- Chang, Jung (October 2019). Big Sister, Little Sister, Red Sister Three Women at the Heart of Twentieth-Century China. Knopf Doubleday Publishing Group. ISBN 9780451493514.
- Li, Laura Tyson (2006). Madame Chiang Kai-shek: China's Eternal First Lady. New York: Atlantic Monthly Press. p. 492. ISBN 0871139332. "China New Life Movement."
- Li, Laura Tyson (2007). Madame Chiang Kai-Shek China's Eternal First Lady. Harvard University Press. ISBN 9780802143228. OCLC 62732875.
- Lin, Zhongjie (2025). Constructing Utopias: China's New Town Movement in the 21st Century. New York, NY: Oxford University Press. ISBN 978-0-19-779330-5.
- Liu, Wennan (2013). "Redefining the Moral and Legal Roles of the State in Everyday Life: The New Life Movement in China in the Mid-1930s". Cross-Currents: East Asian History and Culture Review. 2 (2): 335–365. doi:10.1353/ach.2013.0022.
- Pan, Yihong (2025). Not Just a Man's War: Chinese Women's Memories of the War of Resistance Against Japan, 1931-45. University of British Columbia Press. ISBN 9780774870368.
- "Americans and Ideological Reform: The New Life Movement," in Thomson, James Claude Jr. (1969). While China Faced West: American Reformers in Nationalist China, 1928-1937. Cambridge: Harvard University Press. ISBN 9780674951358., pp. 151– 174.
- Wang, Xian (2025). Gendered Memories: An Imaginary Museum for Ding Ling and Chinese Female Revolutionary Martyrs. China Understandings Today series. Ann Arbor: University of Michigan Press. ISBN 978-0-472-05719-1.
- Yip, Ka-che (1992). "New Life Movement". In Edwin Pak-wah Leung (ed.). Historical Dictionary of Revolutionary China, 1839-1976. Greenwood Press. pp. 289–290.
