= Josep Montserrat i Torrents =

Spanish writer, philosopher and historian (1932–2025)

José Montserrat Torrents
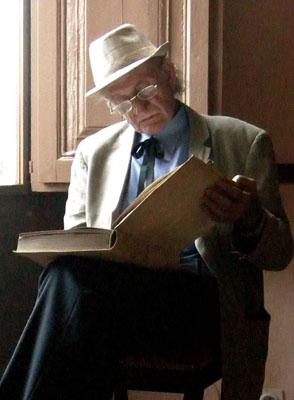
- Born: 27 July 1932
- Died: 21 April 2025
- Occupations: Philosopher, writer, historian and university teacher
- Writing career
- Language: Catalan, Spanish, English

Josep Montserrat i Torrents (1932 – 21 April 2025), better known as José Montserrat Torrents in the Spanish-speaking world, was a Spanish writer, philosopher, historian and Coptic scholar.

== Life and career ==
Montserrat i Torrents was born in Barcelona in 1932. His education took place in Barcelona, Rome, Munster, Paris, and Benares. Due to his activism and writings in the Catalan Press regarding the Second Vatican Council (1962–1965) he was censured in the newspapers from 1966 to 1977. A teacher since 1954, the government denied him the "certificate of political good behavior" due to his anti-Francoist activism, and he was thus unable to continue in that profession. He received a PhD in theology from the Pontifical Gregorian University in Rome in 1968, and a second PhD in philosophy from the University of Barcelona in 1977. Since 1976 he has been professor of philosophy at the Autonomous University of Barcelona, where he became full professor in 1996 and professor emeritus in 2002. He is the coauthor of the Manifest of Bellaterra, 1975 and secretary of the Third Catalan University Congress, April 1978. He has held positions as a visiting professor at the Catholic University in Chile, and the Venice International University, and served as Invited Study Director at the École Pratique des Hautes Études in Paris.

Montserrat i Torrents died on 21 April 2025, at the age of 92.

== Work ==
=== Books ===
- Matrimonio, divorcio, separación: nuevas perspectivas.Editorial Península, Barcelona, 1970.
- The Abandoned Spouse. Bruce, Milwaukee, 1970.
- Estudios sobre Metodio de Olimpo. Eset, Vitoria, 1970.
- Las elecciones episcopales en la historia de la Iglesia. Editorial Pòrtic, Barcelona, 1972. 288 pàgines.
- Los gnósticos. Gredos, Madrid, 1983. 287 (vol. I) y 422 (vol. II) pàgines. Reedició 2002.
- Las transformaciones del platonismo. Publicacions de la Universitat Autònoma de Barcelona, 1987.
- La sinagoga cristiana. El gran conflicto religioso del siglo I. Muchnik, Barcelona, 1989. Reedición: Trotta, Madrid, 2005.
- El desafío cristiano. Las razones del perseguidor. Anaya y Mario Muchnik, Madrid, 1992.
- Platón. De la perplejidad al sistema. Editorial Ariel, Barcelona, 1995.
- El barquer dels déus (novel.la). Publicacions de la Universitat Autònoma de Barcelona, 2005.
- El evangelio de Judas. EDAF, Madrid, 2006.
- Jesús, el galileo armado. Historia laica de Jesús. Edaf, Madrid, 2007.
- El maniqueísmo amb F. Bermejo. Textos y fuentes. Trotta. Madrid, 2008.
- El silencio de Tácito (novela). Ediciones B, Barcelona, 2010. Ediciones B, México, 2010.

=== Translations and text editions ===
- Filó d'Alexandria. La Creació del Món i altres escrits. Laia (Textos Filosòfics), Barcelona, 1983. 195 pàgines.
- Epictet: Enquiridió. Marc Aureli: Reflexions. Joan Leita, traductor; J. Montserrat, introducció i notes. Textos Filosòfics, Laia (Textos Filosòfics), Barcelona, 1983. 195 pàgines.
- Plató. Parmènides, Teetet. Joan Leita, traductor; J. Montserrat, introducció i notes. Textos Filosòfics, Laia (Textos Filosòfics), Barcelona, 1990. 263 pàgines.
- Hans Jonas, La religión gnóstica, Siruela, 2000. Prólogo de J. Montserrat Torrents.
- I. Introducción general. Exposición sobre el alma. Apócrifo de Juan. Allógenes. La hipóstasis de los arcontes. Sobre el origen del mundo. Asclepio. Enseñanxa autorizada. Platón, La República. En Antonio Piñero, José Montserrat, Francisco García Bazán, Textos gnósticos. Biblioteca de Nag Hammadi I: Tratados filosóficos y cosmológicos, Trotta, Madrid, 1997; 2º ed. 2000.
- Evangelio de María. En Antonio Piñero, José Montserrat, Francisco García Bazán, Textos gnósticos. Biblioteca de Nag Hammadi II; Evangelios, hechos, cartas. Trotta, Madrid, 2000.
- Apocalipsis de Pablo. Segundo apocalipsis de Santiago. El Pensamiento de Nuestro Gran poder. Melquisedec. Testimonio de la verdad. La interpretación del conocimiento. Antonio Piñero, José Montserrat, Francisco García Bazán, Textos gnósticos. Biblioteca de Nag Hammadi III: Apocalipsis y otros escritos. Trotta, Madrid, 2001. Edición portuguesa de los tres volúmenes: Esquilo, Lisboa, 2005.
- Plotí. Ennèades (Antologia). Traducció de Carles Garriga. Edicions 62 (Textos Filosòfics), 2006.

=== Scientific articles ===
- Edició de les Actes del III Congrés Universitari Català. Edicions 62. Barcelona, 1980.
- El universo masculino de los naasenos, Faventia 2/1, 7–13, 1980.
- El platonismo de la doctrina valentiniana de las tres hipóstasis, Enrahonar 1, 17–31, 1981.
- Filó d'Alexandria. De la saviesa a la contemplació, Enrahonar 7/8, 103- 107, 1984
- El Timeo : de la política a la ciencia a través de la imaginación, Enrahonar 12, 31–40, 1985.
- La cosmogonie du Timée et les premiers chapitres de la Génèse . Quelques lectures juives et gnostiques. Archivio di Filosofia 53, 287–298. 1985.
- Sociologia i metafísica de la gnosi, Enrahonar 13, 43–56, 1986.
- Origenismo i gnosis: los "perfectos" de Metodio de Olimpo. Augustinianum 26, 89–101. 1986.
- La constitució harmònica de l'Anima del Món en el Timeu de Plató, Butlletí de la Societat Catalana de Ciències Exactes, 57–65, 1988.
- Orígenes. El Diálogo que no pudo ser. Philosophia pacis. Homenaje a Raimundo Pannikar, Símbolo Editorial, Barcelona, 409–424, 1989.
- La racionalidad matemática del universo en el Timeo. II Quinzena de Filosofia de la Ciència, pàgines 15¬–27. Publicacions de la Universitat Autònoma de Barcelona, 1988.
- Some epistemological notes on Greek cosmology, a MEYERSTEIN, W. (ed.) Foundations of Big Bang Cosmology, pàgines 5–8. World Scientific, Singapur, 1989.
- Presència d'Egipte a la cultura hellenística. Egipte i Grècia, pàgines 165–178. Fundació Caixa de Pensions, Barcelona, 1989.
- Orígenes. El diálogo que no pudo ser. Philosophia Pacis. Homenaje a Raimon Panikkar, ed. por M. Siguán, pàgines 409–424. Símbolo Editorial, 1991.
- Les Pérates. Pleroma (Homenaje an Antonio Orbe), pàgines 229–242. Santiago de Compostela, 1990.
- Los fundamentos filosóficos de las gnosis occidentales. La gnosis o el conocimiento de lo oculto, pàgines 39–52. Universidad Complutense de Madrid, 1990.
- Evangelis gnòstics. Apòcrifs del Nou Testament, edic. por A. Puig, pàgines 67–178. Edicions Proa, Barcelona, 1990.
- Apunts sobre l'essència grega de la modernitat. Enrahonar 17, pàgines 63–67, 1991.
- L'essència del cristianisme. Enrahonar 18, pàgines 61–69, 1992.
- El diálogo de las culturas. Heterodoxia 18, pàgines 115–121, 1992.
- El marco religioso del cristianismo primitivo (II). Reflexiones y perspectivas. Orígenes del cristianismo, ed. por A. Piñero, pàgines 67–80. El Almendro, Córdoba, 1992.
- Coautor amb Daniel Quesada, El factor de invención en las teorías cosmológicas. Enrahonar 20, pàgines 99–105, 1993.
- Los evangelios gnósticos. Fuentes del cristianismo. Tradiciones primitivas sobre Jesús, Ed. A. Piñero, pàgines 455–475. El Almendro, Córdoba, 1993.
- L'aparença del sentit. El problema de la realitat, ed. X. Antich, pàgines 88–91. Barcelona, 1995.
- Hipàtia, matemàtica i doblement gentil. Quaderns. Observatori de la Comunicació Científica 1, pàgines 50–52, 1995.
- Sociologie et métaphysique de la gnose. Heresis 23, pàgines 57–73, 1995.
- La gnosis. Enciclopedia Iberoamericana de Filosofia. Vol. 14: Historia de la filosofía Antigua, pàgines 363–384, Madrid, Trotta, 1997.
- Rationale, reale, apparens. Enrahonar. Número Extraordinari. Segundo Congreso Internacional de Ontología, pàgines 333–338. Universitat Autònoma de Barcelona, 1999.
- Plató, entre la veritat i el mite. La mitologia. II Curs de Pensament i Cultura Clàssica". Universitat de les Illes Balears, 69–76, 1999.
- Methodius of Olympus, Symposium III 4–8: An Interpretation. Studia Patristica XIII. Proceedings of the VI International Conference On Patristic Studies, Oxford, 1971, ed. por E. Livingstone, pàgines 239–243, Akademie Verlag, Berlin 1975.
- La notice d'Hippolyte sur les Naassènes. Studia Patristica XVII, Proceedings of the VIII International Conference On Patristic Studies, Oxford, 1979 ed. por E. Livingstone, pags. 231–242. Pergamon Press, Oxford, 1983.
- La philosophie du Livre de Baruch de Justin. Studia Patristica XVIII, Proceedings of the IX International Conference On Patristic Studies, Oxford, 1983 ed. por E. Livingstone, pàgines 253–261. Cistercian Press, Kalamazoo y Oxford, 1985.
- Plato's Philosophy of Science and Trinitarian Theology. Studia Patristica XX, Proceedings of the X International Conference on Patristic Studies, Oxford, 1987, ed. por E. Livingstone, págs. 102–118. Peeters, Lovaina, 1989.
- La notice d'Hippolyte sur les Séthiens. Studia Patristica XXIV, Proceedings of the XI International Conference on Patristic Studies, Oxford, 1991, ed. por E. Livingstone, pàgines 390–398. Peeters, Lovaina, 1993.
- The Social and Cultural Setting of the Nag Hammadi Library. Studia Patristica, Proceedings of the XII International Conference on Patristic Studies, Oxford, 1995, ed. por E. Livingstone, Peeters, Lovaina, 1997.
- Un'omelia copta della Biblioteca Marciana. Miscellanea Marciana XVII, pàgines 97–117, 2002.
- Le débordement (pors) des ténèbres corporelles sur la lumière corporelle selon Mani. Études coptes IX. (Cahiers de la Bibliothèque copte 14) París, pàgines 305–309, 2006.
- L'ascension de l'âme dans l'Évangile de Judas (45,24 – 47,1), Apocrypha 20, 229–237, (2009).
- Jésus, Judas et les justes, Catorzième journée d'études coptes, Lovaina, 2011.

=== Collaborations in press and radio ===
- Radio Nacional de España, 1955–1963
- TVE Miramar 1958–1962
- Gaceta Ilustrada
- La Vanguardia
- La Croix (París)
- Tele/Exprés, 1965–1966
- Destino, 1977
- Diari de Barcelona, 1977–1978
- El observador
