= Francesco Carotta =

Italian writer

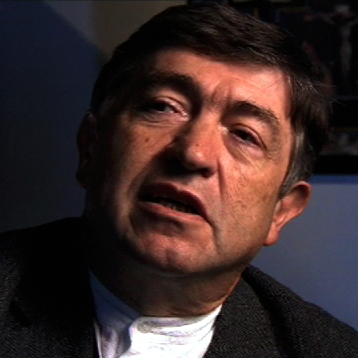
- Francesco Carotta (2007)
- Born: 1946 (age 79–80); Veneto, Italy
- Other names: Cham; Cam
- Education: Philosophy, Linguistics
- Occupation: Journalist
- Years active: 1999-present
- Known for: Caesarian origin of Christianity; Gospel as a diegetic transposition
- Notable work: Jesus was Caesar – On the Julian Origin of Christianity
- Website: http://www.carotta.de

Francesco Carotta (born 1946 in Veneto, Italy) is an Italian writer who developed a theory that the historical Jesus was based on the life of Julius Caesar, that the Gospels were a rewriting of Roman historical sources, and that Christianity developed from the cult of the deified Caesar.

== Biography ==
Francesco Carotta was born in 1946 in Veneto, Italy. Carotta studied philosophy in France and linguistics in Germany. In the 1970s he was active as a writer in the cultural-political movements in Frankfurt, Bologna and Rome. In 1980 Carotta headed the Frankfurt-based Casa di Cultura Popolare as director. As executive director and publisher he supported Kore, a Freiburg publisher of feminist books and women's literature. He first published his theories in the late 1980s. In 1999 he presented his theory in the book Was Jesus Caesar? Since then he has continued his research and written several articles. He has participated in documentary films on Caesar and Christ, given academic lectures, and reconstructed Caesar's funeral ceremony in Spain, based on the historical sources. Carotta lives in Kirchzarten near Freiburg.

== Caesarian origin of Christianity ==
Carotta postulates that the historical person behind the Biblical figure Jesus Christ was not Jesus of Nazareth, but the Roman statesman Gaius Julius Caesar, from whose cult Christianity developed over the course of several generations.

=== Jesus was Caesar ===
The thesis of Carotta's book Jesus was Caesar is based on a comparison of the gospels, especially the earliest, the Gospel of Mark, with the ancient sources about the last years in the life of Caesar and his immediate legacy. Roman sources include Appian, Plutarch, and Suetonius, who all relied to some extent on Caesar's contemporary Gaius Asinius Pollio and his lost Historiae, which according to Carotta might constitute the "Latin Ur-Gospel". This is augmented by comparisons from archaeology, numismatics, iconography, liturgy, and ritual traditions. Carotta argues that the multiple parallels he sees between the lives and cults of Caesar and Jesus can best be explained by his theory that Jesus is based on the deified Caesar, transformed and mirrored in the eastern Hellenistic and judaizing regions of the Roman Empire.

Within Carotta's theory the gospels are hypertexts after a diegetic transposition of Latin and Greek Roman sources (hypotexts) on Caesar's life from the beginning of the civil war, the crossing of the Rubicon, his assassination, funeral, and deification, conforming to Jesus's mission from the Jordan to his arrest, crucifixion, and resurrection. Textually transformed from Rome to Jerusalem in Caesar's eastern veteran colonies, the Gospel narrative with its altered geography, dramatic structure, its characters and newly adopted cultural environment, would therefore have been written neither as a mimetic approximation of Caesarian attributes nor as a mythological amalgam, but as a directly dependent, albeit mutated rewriting (réécriture) of actual history.

He argues that, following this initial transposition, there was at first a redaction of the Caesarian Ur-Gospel inspired by Augustan history and theogony, whereby the later synoptic gospels by Matthew and Luke incorporated (among other pericopes) the Nativity of Jesus, originally transposed from the nativity of Augustus, and the resurrection narrative, according to the chronological-biographical structures in the historical account by Nicolaus of Damascus. Later generations produced more discrete traditions like the Gospel of John, the Acts of the Apostles, and the Book of Revelation. According to Carotta, the ultimate early Christian metamorphosis of the eastern Caesar religion, which was to reinterpret the foundational cult of the Julian imperial dynasty with regard to the contested Palestine, was provoked by the new Flavian theopolitical ideology, which also induced the rewriting of the vita of Vespasian's court historian Flavius Josephus into the hagiography of Saint Paul in the second part of Acts.

==== Reception ====
Carotta's book and its translations have drawn little serious academic attention. Except for few feuilleton write-ups the first German edition of Carotta's book was not reviewed.

Outside of Germany his theory drew little response, while the 2003 Dutch translation caused a controversial and at times heated debate in the Dutch media: historian Thomas von der Dunk, philosopher Andreas Kinneging and philosopher Paul Cliteur were among those who supported Carotta's theory, while philosopher Willem J. Ouweneel, theologian Matthijs de Jong, historians Marc van Uytfanghe and Anton van Hooff, and the Dutch Bible Society dismissed the book. The discussion was revived briefly when a feature documentary about Carotta's research was released in 2007. In an issue of the Dutch magazine Quest Historie dealing with conspiracy theories, theologian Annette Merz, while acknowledging the similarities between the lives of Jesus and Caesar, was quoted as arguing that Carotta would have to refute non-Christian sources for the existence of Jesus.

Dominican priest Jerome Murphy-O'Connor criticized Carotta for avoiding explanations on why the "figure called Jesus Christ" would have been "invented" and given a "life modeled on that of Julius Caesar", and "why there should be four versions of the career of Jesus". Latinist Maria Wyke called Carotta's views "eccentric" and described the connections between Caesar and Jesus listed by him as "sweeping and often superficial parallels, however detailed and justified at book length". Spanish philologist Antonio Piñero called Carotta's reading of the gospels as a diegetic transposition an "ingenious exercise" but also noted several methodological shortcomings which made the theory "completely implausible".

=== Expanded theory and other works ===
During a 2008 lecture and in a subsequent article Carotta presented an extension of his theory, which interprets the gospels as a diegetic transposition. In 2009 Carotta wrote an article in which he supported the arguments for the authenticity of the so-called Orpheos Bakkikos, a supposedly syncretistic early Christian amulet showing the Crucifixion of Christ. Carotta postulates that the lost amulet showed the funerary wax effigy of Caesar, presented on a tropaeum. In a 2011 article Carotta argued for a restitution of the Liberalia (17 March) as the correct date of Caesar's funeral ceremony, and for a dismissal of the chronology developed by 19th century German scholars. In a 2012 book containing earlier and new articles he argued that Fulvia was the mother of Christianity and possibly the author of the ur-gospel.

In a book published in October 2024, Carotta argues that the number 666 in the Book of Revelation refers to Cleopatra.

== Selected works ==
=== Books ===
- Jesus was Caesar: On the Julian Origin of Christianity. An Investigative Report. Soesterberg: Aspekt, 2005 (revised), ISBN 90-5911-396-9 (English excerpts; German original).
- Was Jesus Caesar? – Artikel und Vorträge. Eine Suche nach dem römischen Ursprung des Christentums. Kiel: Ludwig, 2012, ISBN 978-3-937719-63-4.

== See also ==
- Roman imperial cult
- Divus Iulius
