= Venice International University =

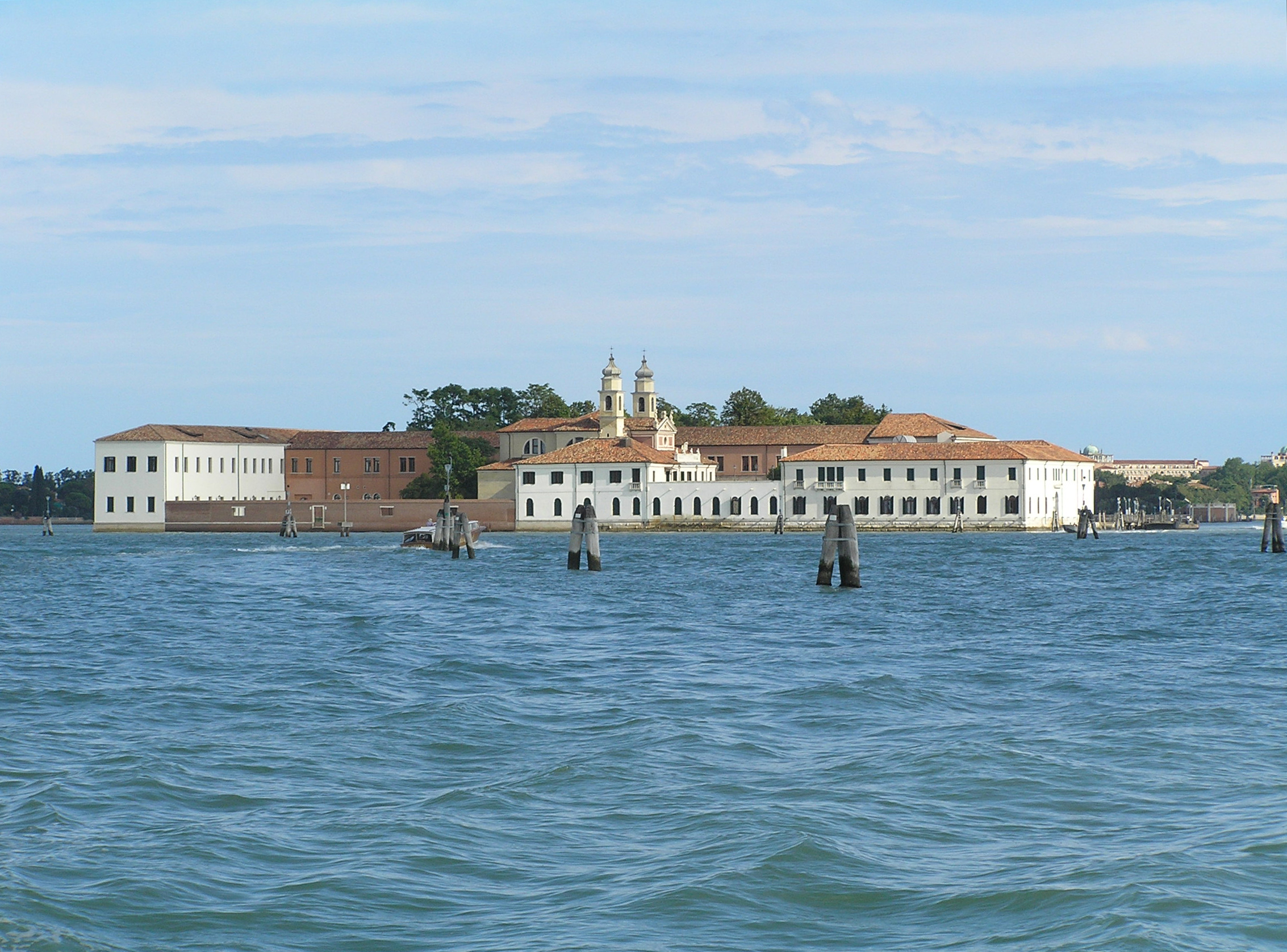
- The Island of San Servolo
- Established: 1995
- President: Umberto Vattani
- Dean: Carmelo Marabello
- Location: Venice, Italy; 45°25′07″N 12°21′26″E
- Website: univiu.org
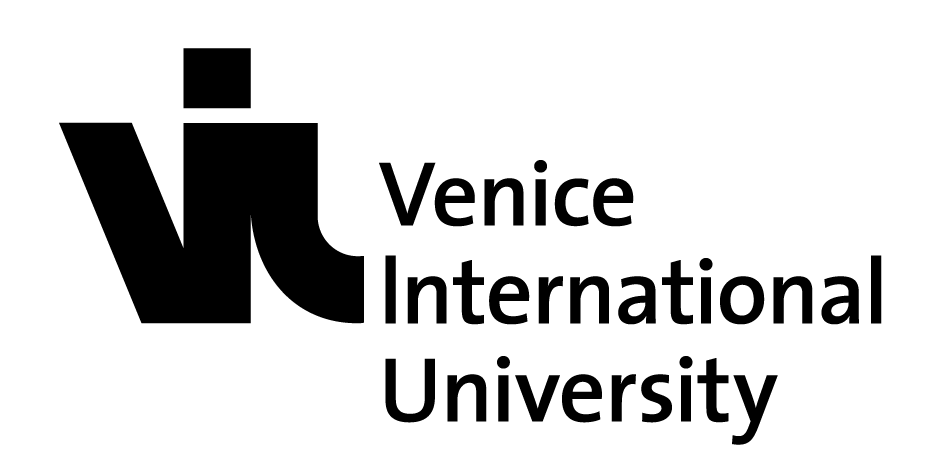

Venice International University (VIU) is an international center for higher education and research located on the island of San Servolo, in Venice, Italy.

== Campus ==
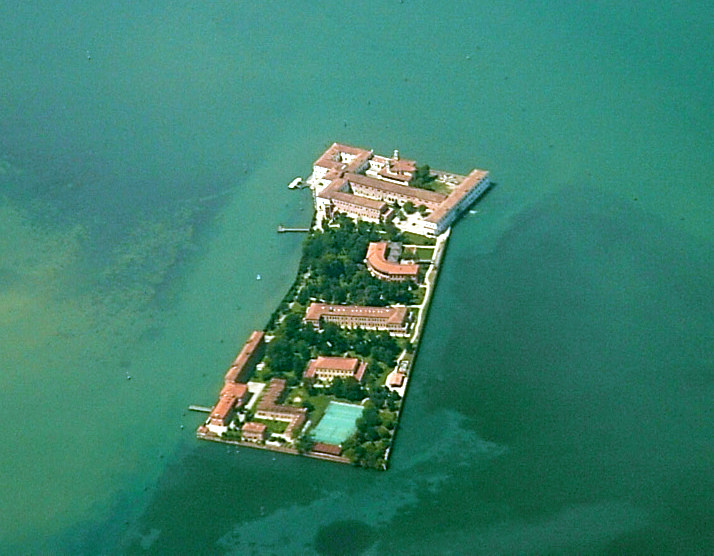
Aerial view of San Servolo

Venice International University is located on the island of San Servolo, in buildings that were once a monastery and were then turned into a military hospital and later on into a psychiatric hospital which was disbanded in 1987. In 1995 the buildings underwent a meticulous restoration work and the island now offers a park with sport grounds, a cafeteria, a bar and some works of art by contemporary international artists, such as Kan Yasuda, Pietro Consagra, Fabrizio Plessi and Sandro Chia. VIU facilities include lecture rooms, conference and seminar rooms, a library, pc rooms and broadband wi-fi connection. A public boat service connects the island to Venice historical center.

== Members ==
It was established on December 15, 1995, as a consortium of five Universities and two Italian Institutions. Since then, Venice International University has grown to include a total of twenty members (as of 2020), in collaboration and with support of the Metropolitan City of Venice, Italy.

- Boston College, United States
- Duke University, United States
- LMU Munich, Germany
- Tel Aviv University, Israel
- Korea University, Seoul, Republic of Korea
- Tsinghua University, Beijing, China
- Ca' Foscari University of Venice, Italy
- University IUAV of Venice, Italy
- European University at Saint Petersburg, Russia
- Waseda University, Tokyo, Japan
- University of Padua, Italy
- University of Bordeaux, France
- National Research Council (Italy)
- University of Lausanne, Switzerland
- Institut National de la Recherche Scientifique, Quebec City, Canada
- University of Rome Tor Vergata, Italy
- KU Leuven, Belgium
- Stellenbosch University, South Africa
- University of Exeter, United Kingdom
- University of Ljubljana, Slovenia

== SHSS - School of Humanities and Social Sciences ==
The School of Humanities and Social Sciences (SHSS) offers university courses, intensive seminars, extra-curricular and co-curricular activities and summer schools during the two academic semesters (Fall and Spring) that are held every year. All courses are offered in English by professors from the Member Universities and they are open to all students in the Member Universities.

== TEDIS Center ==
TEDIS (Center for Studies on Technologies in Distributed Intelligence Systems) is a research center established within Venice International University in 1999. The center carries out research on innovation and competitiveness, under the supervision of an international management committee. TEDIS has also developed a joint research program on industrial districts, globalization, and global value chains in cooperation with Duke University Center on Globalization, Governance and Competitiveness.

TEDIS research focuses on four main areas:

- Industrial Districts, Technologies and Networks
- SMEs, Local Clusters and Internationalization
- Creativity, Design and Innovation
- Transport, Logistics and Supply Chain Management

== TEN Center ==
The Center for Thematic Environmental Networks (TEN) is a training and research center in the field of environment and sustainable development. In 2003, the Italian Ministry of Environment, Land and Sea selected TEN Center as the scientific partner for its Capacity Building activity within the Sino-Italian Cooperation Program for Environmental Protection as well as for the Course on Sustainability for East European countries, Central Asia and the Black Sea Region.

== Notable people ==
Prominent scholars who have taught at Venice International University include:

- Caroline Bruzelius, Professor of Art and Art History
- Orin Starn, Professor of Cultural Anthropology and History
- Kristine Stiles
- Josep Montserrat i Torrents
