= San Servolo =

Italian island in the Venetian Lagoon

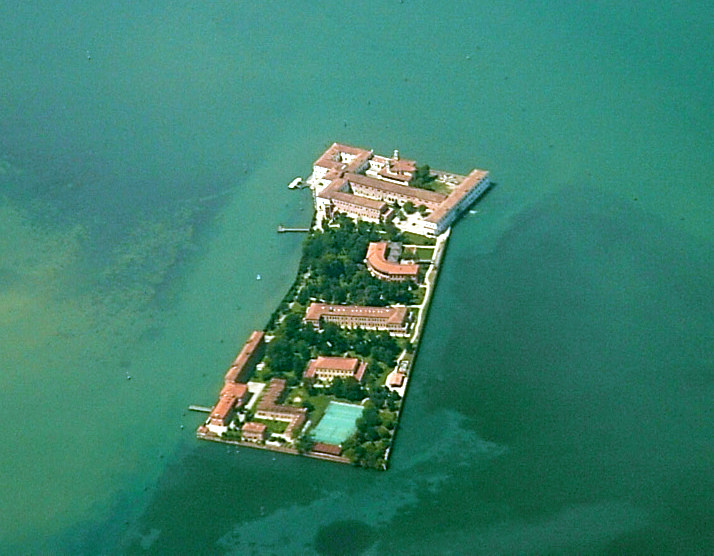
- Aerial view of San Servolo

- Location within Venetian Lagoon

Geography
- Coordinates: 45.418666°N 12.357338°E
- Adjacent to: Venetian Lagoon

Administration
- Italy
- Region: Veneto
- Province: Province of Venice

San Servolo ['sɛrvolo] is an Italian island in the Venetian Lagoon, to the southeast of San Giorgio Maggiore. Earlier housing a monastery of Benedictine monks, later an asylum for the insane, the island is now home to a museum and Venice International University.

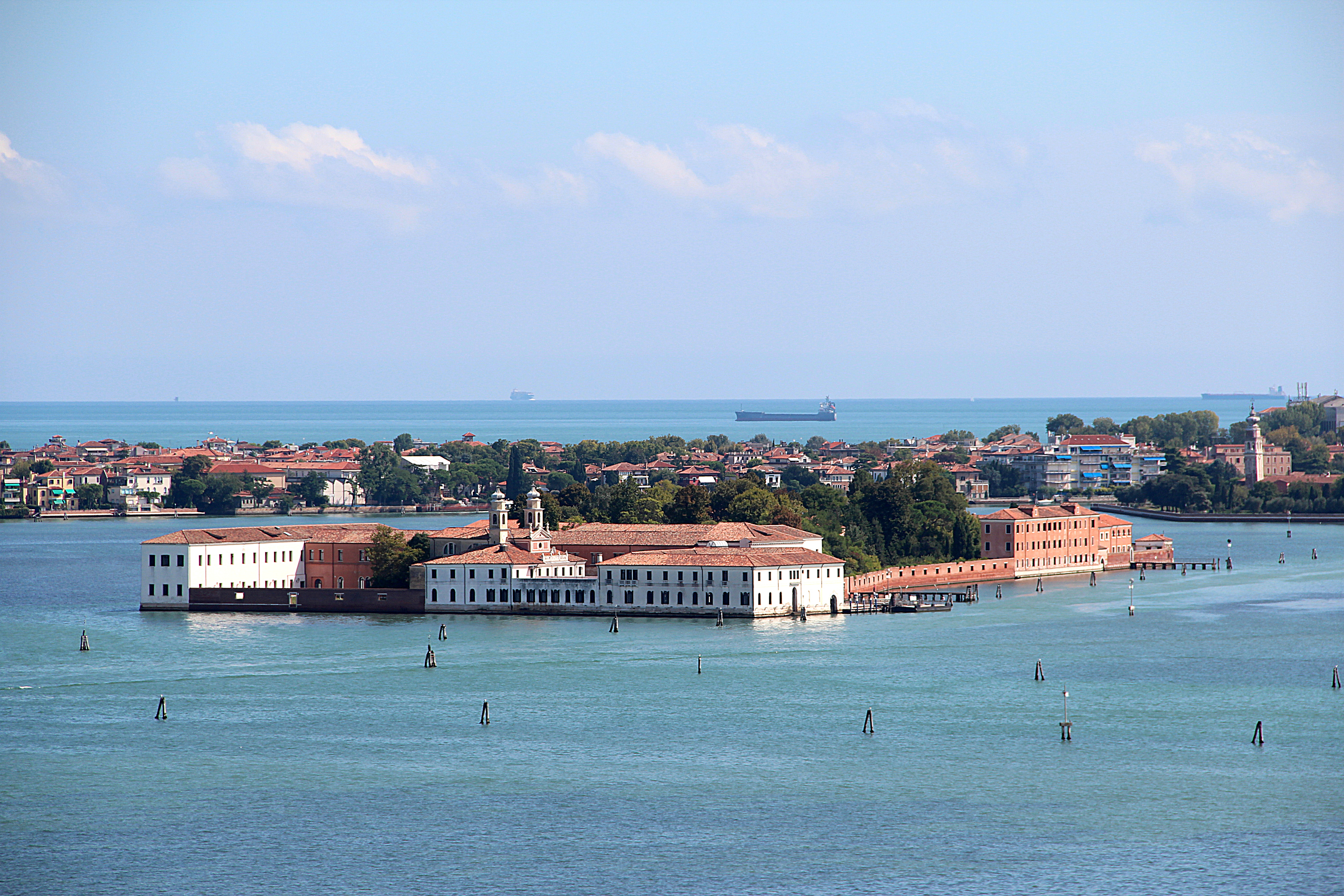
San Servolo Island seen from the bell tower of the Basilica of San Giorgio Maggiore

== History ==
Benedictine monks lived on this island from at least the eighth century and for almost five hundred years. They were joined later by nuns escaping from the convents of Saints Leone and Basso on the island of Malamocco, which had been destroyed by a seaquake. At the beginning of the 15th century, the nuns departed, but they were soon replaced by a few dozen other nuns, who were fleeing the Turkish invasion of Crete. However, by the beginning of the eighteenth century, only a few were left, and soon thereafter the Senate of the Republic of Venice designated San Servolo as the site of a new military hospital, needed due to the continuing war against the Turks. Later the hospital was used to care for the mentally ill.

In 1978, government-instituted reforms of psychiatric treatment resulted in the closure of the hospital. The next year, the Venice government established on the island the "Istituto per le Ricerche e gli Studi sull'Emarginazione Sociale e Culturale" (Institute for the Study of Social and Cultural Marginalization) to preserve the documents associated with the history of the psychiatric hospital. Venice International University, a center for research and education and a collaboration among ten universities from around the world, was formed on San Servolo in 1995. Since 2012, the island has been home to the Ca'Foscari International College, a state-funded honours college aimed at students from multilingual and multicultural backgrounds.

Also noteworthy is the rich flora of San Servolo, originally planted for the island's pharmacy, which was used to supply medicine to the military.

== Arts and letters ==
Recently, San Servolo has started hosting an annual international artist residency and has become the site for numerous exhibitions, festivals and performances.

== Gallery ==
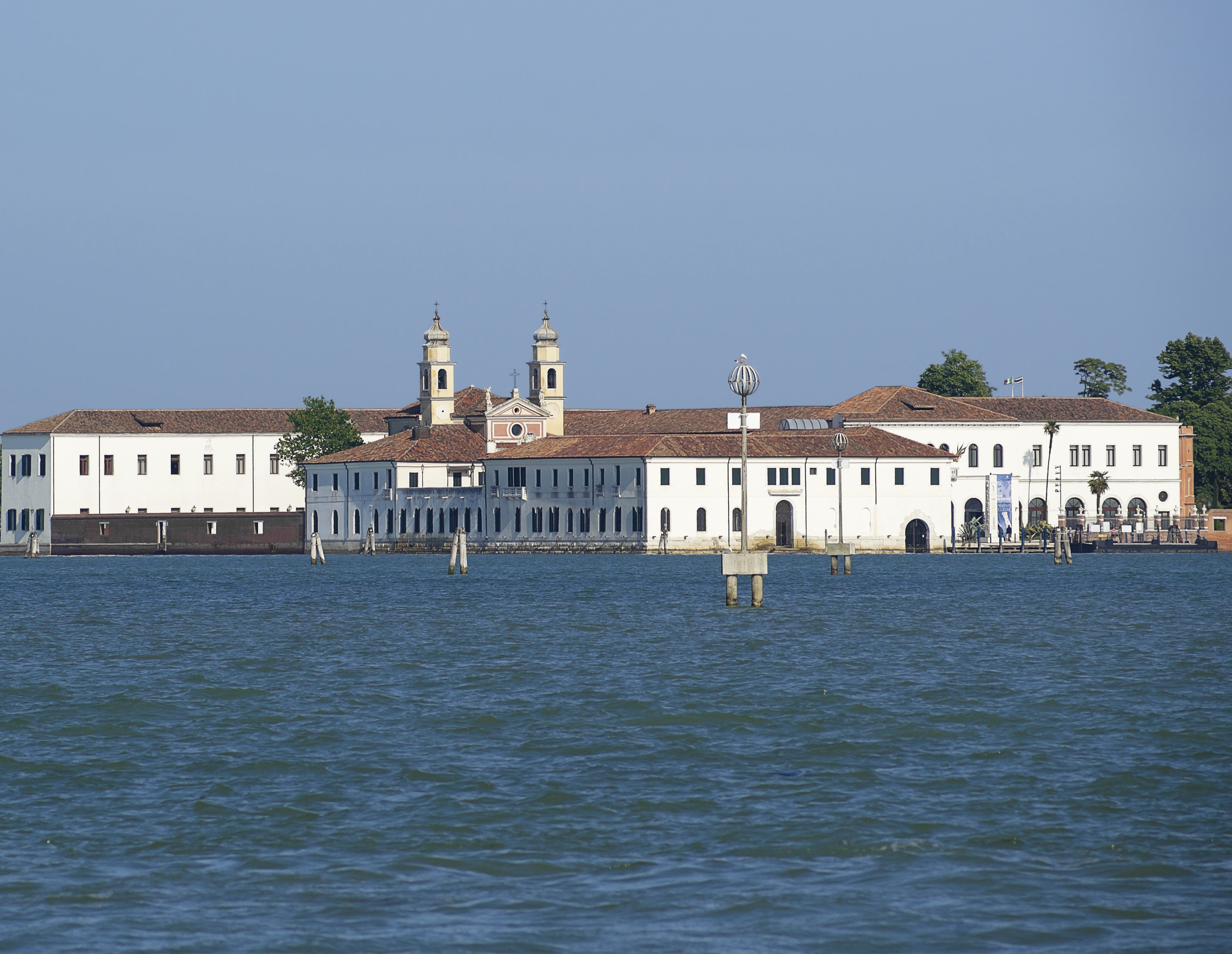
Buildings of the Benedictines

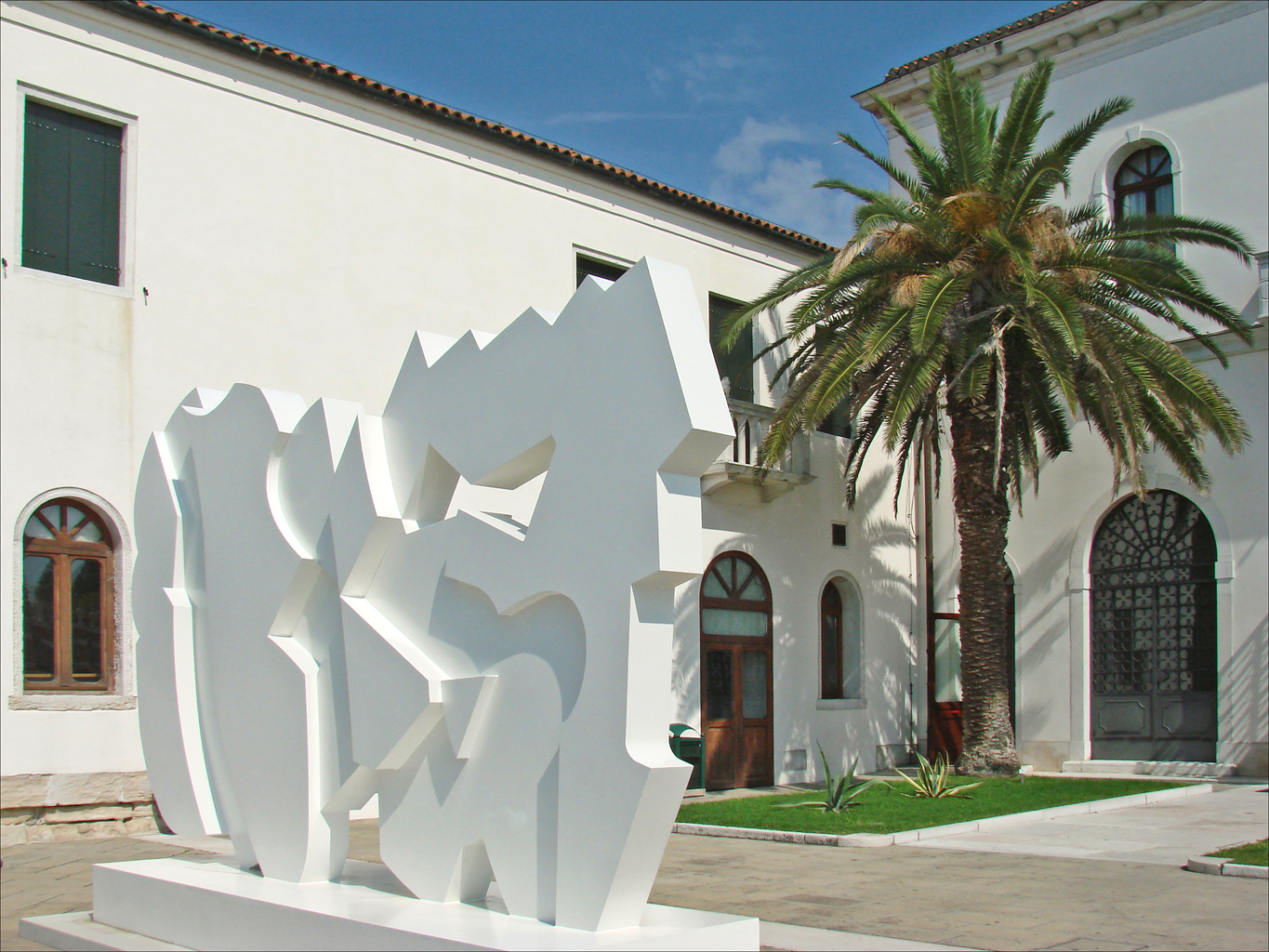

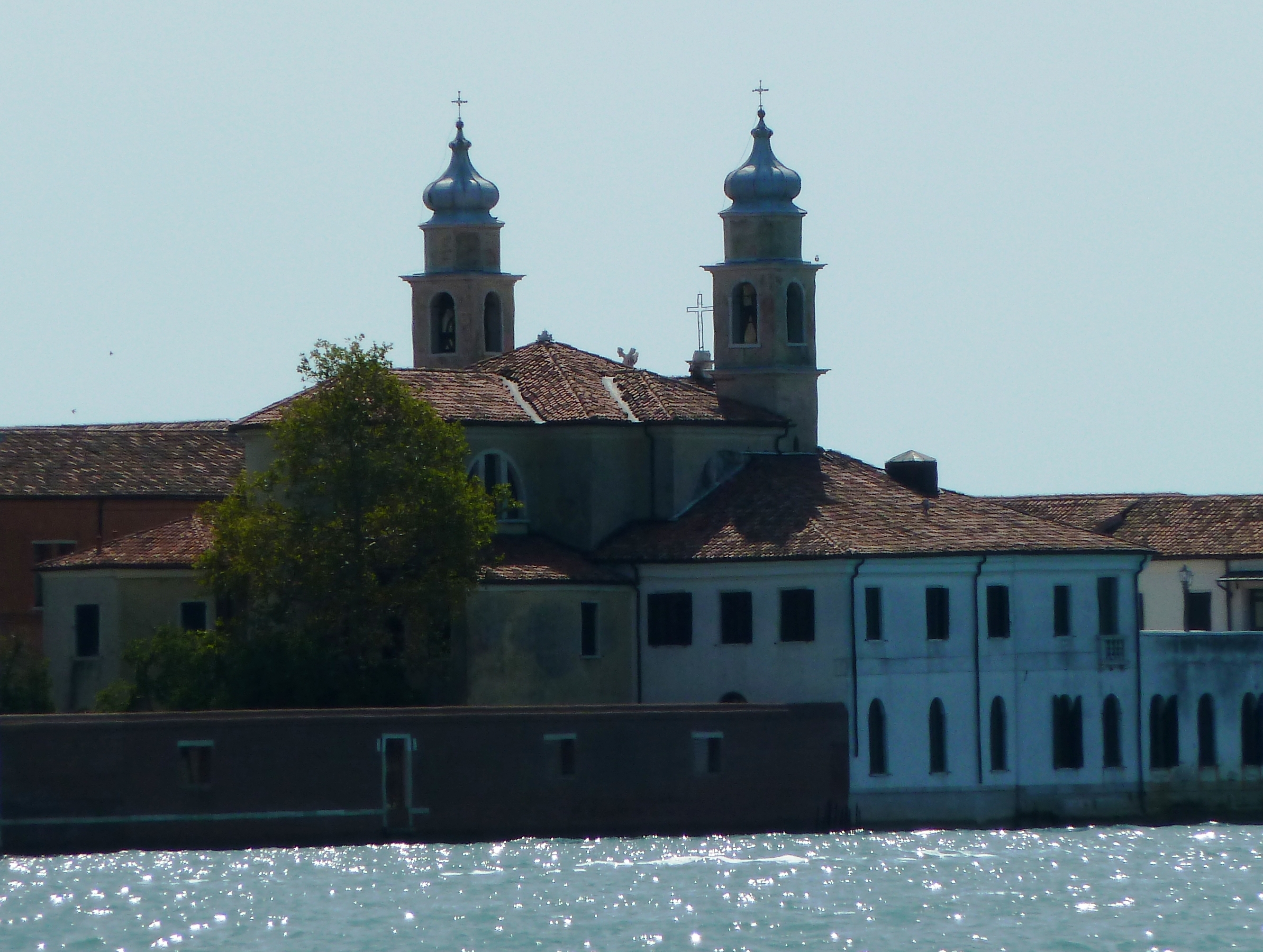

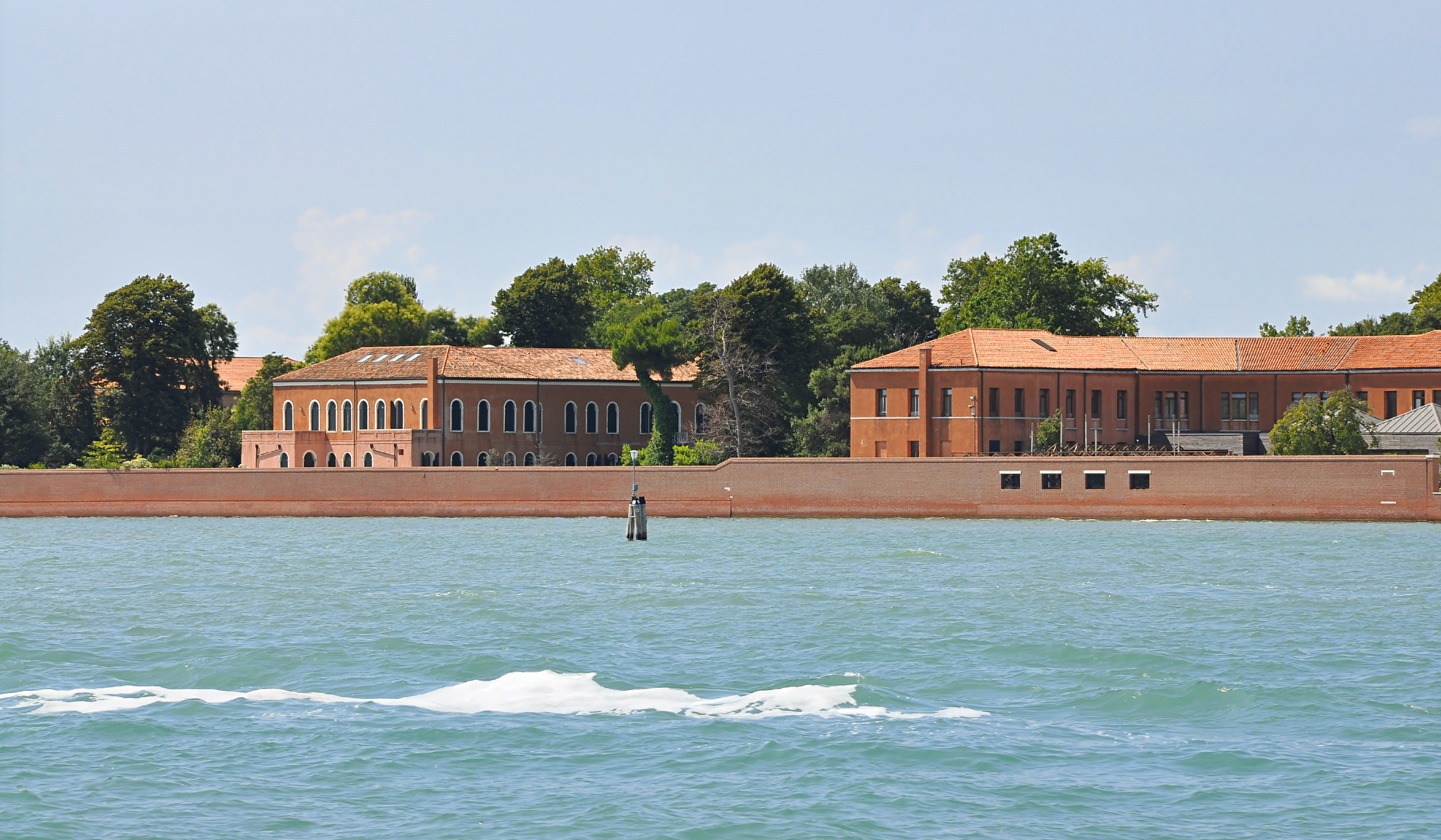

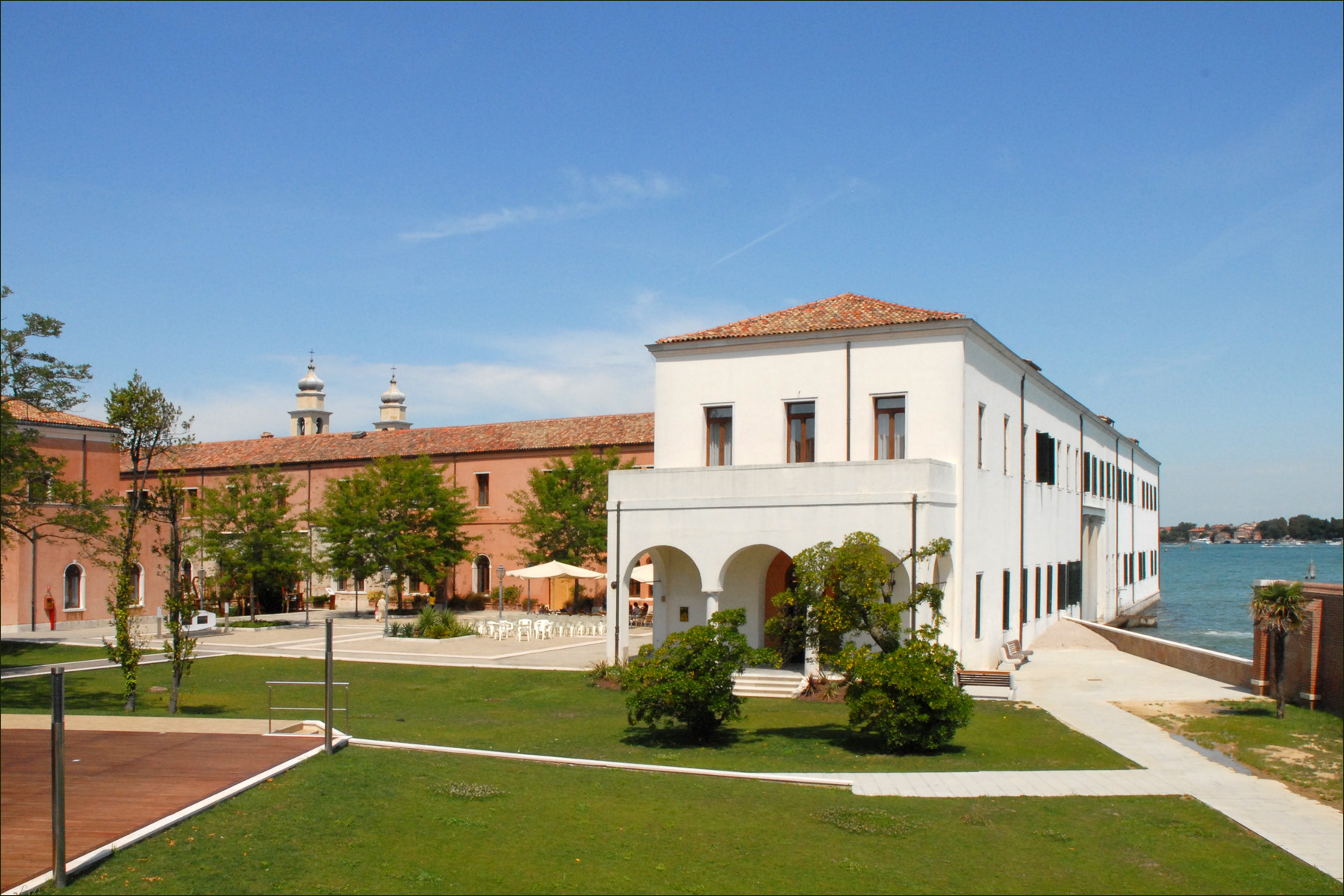

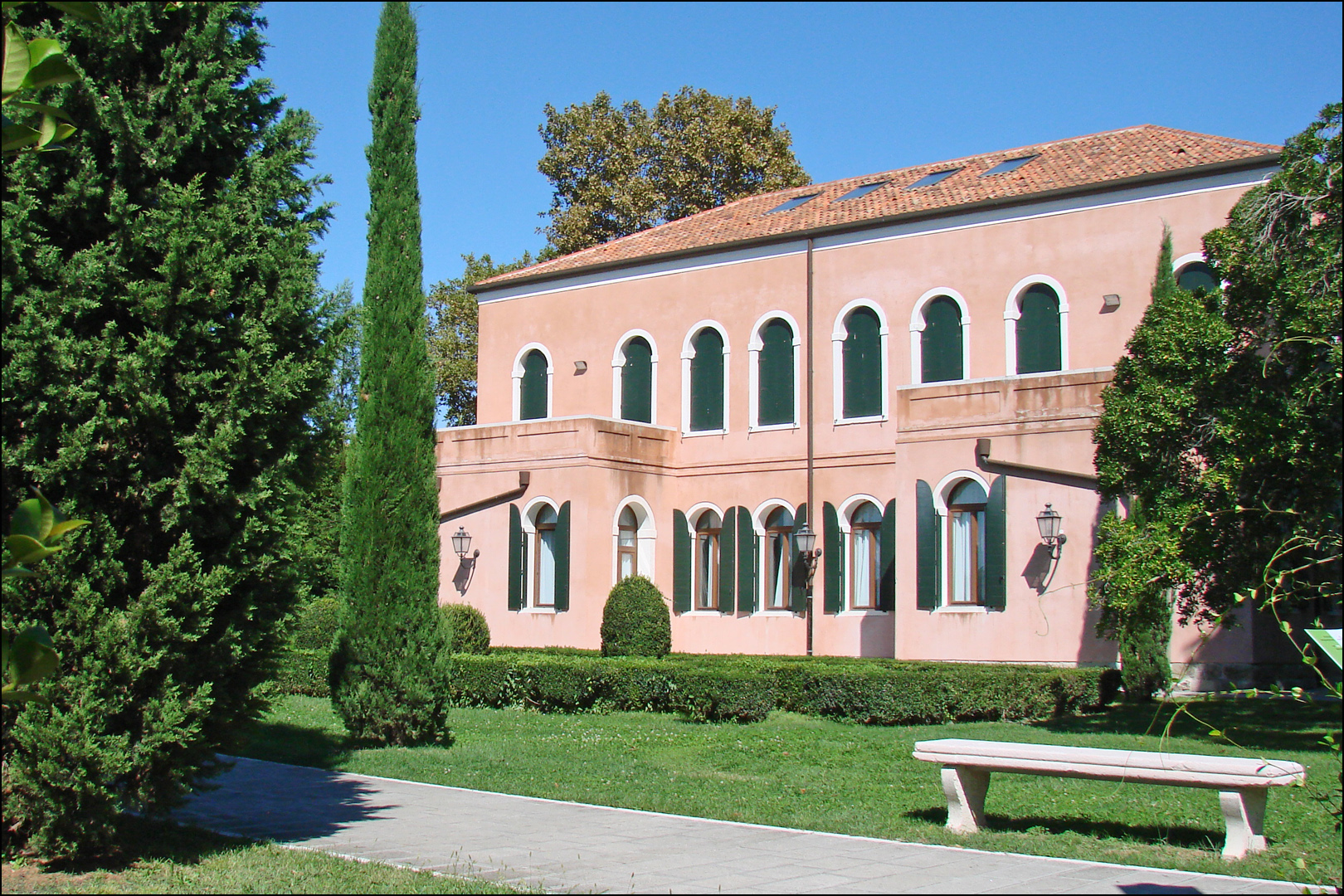
