= Orin Starn =

American anthropologist

Orin Starn is an anthropologist and writer at Duke University. He has chaired the Duke Cultural Anthropology department, directed the Duke Center for Latin American and Caribbean Studies, and been the faculty director of the Duke Human Rights Center.

Starn teaches courses about Latin America, Native American culture and politics, human rights, and sports and society, among other issues. He received Duke University's Robert B. Cox Distinguished Teaching Award in 2004 and was awarded the Sally Dalton Robinson Distinguished Professorship in 2005. Starn has been researching the experience of Amazon warehouse workers. He worked for two years at Amazon warehouses and is a member of CAUSE, the worker-led union organizing drive at the RDU1 Amazon facility in Garner, North Carolina, and written about what it's like to work at Amazon and the fight for unionization there.

Starn is the author, co-author, or editor of 11 books. He has appeared on radio and television programs, and writes for newspapers, including the Los Angeles Times and Chronicle of Higher Education.

== Ishi, the Andes, and indigenous rights ==
Starn was involved in the repatriation to California of the remains of Ishi, the last Yahi Indian. Starn's book Ishi's Brain gives an account of it as well as the story of Ishi's life.

He has also written extensively about war and society in Peru, including The Shining Path, Nightwatch, and The Peru Reader, as well as several books in Spanish. A book Starn co-edited with Marisol de la Cadena, Indigenous Experience Today, explores the global rise of indigenous politics and activism.

== Sports, society, and college athletics ==
Starn has conducted research on sports and society, and appeared on ESPN and sports talk shows. His online course "Sports and Society" has drawn thousands of students worldwide. He also maintains a related blog, Golf Politics.

Starn wrote op-eds in North Carolina newspapers about the 2006 Duke University lacrosse case) and was quoted in other outlets, including The New Yorker and The News & Observer.

During the case, Starn took issue with some of Duke basketball coach Mike Krzyzewski's actions. In a June 21, 2006 article in The News & Observer, Starn was quoted as stating, "Whether Coach Krzyzewski likes it or not, these are serious issues and issues being raised at colleges around the country." He also accused bloggers of inaccurately portraying the involvement of Duke faculty in the lacrosse case in a January 2007 op-ed in the Durham Herald-Sun.

Starn has cited the incident in his criticism of Duke's participation in Division I athletics. In another News & Observer article, Starn was quoted as stating, "It's ridiculous to talk about a balance between athletics and academics... Athletics should be a subset underneath a university's main mission... The idea that athletics should have near-equal weight with academics is just wrong."

== Works ==
- Nursing the Revolution. (1991)
- The Peru Reader: History, Culture, Politics. Co-editor with Carlos Ivan Degregori and Robin Kirk. Durham, North Carolina: Duke University Press, 1995.
- The Revolt against Revolution (1995)
- "Maoism in the Andes: The Communist Party in Peru -- Shining Path and the Refusal of History". In Critical Perspectives on Mao Zedong's Thought. Edited by Arif Dirlik, Paul Healy, and Nick Knight. Atlantic Highlands, New Jersey: Humanities Press, 1997, pp. 267–288.
- Between Resistance and Revolution: Cultural Politics and Social Protest. Co-editor with Richard G. Fox. New Brunswick, New Jersey: Rutgers University Press, 1997.
- Nightwatch: The Politics of Protest in the Andes. Durham, North Carolina: Duke University Press, 1999.
- Ishi's Brain: In Search of America's Last 'Wild' Indian. New York: W. W. Norton, 2004. 978-0-393-05133-9
- Here Come the Anthros. (2009)
- The Passion of Tiger Woods: An Anthropologist Reports on Golf, Race, and Celebrity Scandal. Durham: Duke University Press (2011)
- The Shining Path: Love, Madness, and Revolution in the Andes. Co-author with Miguel La Serna. New York: W. W. Norton, 2019.
- Indigenous Experience Today (co-editor)
