= China Information =

- Discipline: Area studies
- Language: English
- Edited by: Tak-Wing Ngo

Publication details
- History: 1986-present
- Publisher: SAGE Publications
- Frequency: Triannually

Standard abbreviations
- ISO 4: China Inf.

Indexing
- ISSN: 0920-203X (print); 1741-590X (web)
- LCCN: 98645623
- OCLC no.: 55614236

Links
- Journal homepage; Online access; Online archives

China Information: A Journal on Contemporary China Studies, commonly known as China Information, is a triannual peer-reviewed academic journal that covers Chinese studies in the widest sense.

== History ==
China Information
- Traditional Chinese: 國情導報
- Simplified Chinese: 国情导报
Transcriptions
Standard Mandarin
- Hanyu Pinyin: Guóqíng Dǎobào

China Information was established in 1986. It was originally published by the Documentation and Research Centre for Contemporary China at Leiden University, but since 2004 it has been published by SAGE Publications.

The founding editor-in-chief was Woei Lien Chong (莊愛蓮) at Leiden University. The journal has been under the editorship of Tak-Wing Ngo (吳德榮) at the University of Macao since 2002.

== Abstracting and indexing ==
The journal is abstracted and indexed in:

- Academic Search Premier
- America: History and Life
- Current Contents/Social and Behavioral Sciences
- International Bibliography of the Social Sciences
- International Political Science Abstracts
- MLA International Bibliography
- Social Sciences Citation Index
- Scopus
