= Madame Chiang Kai-shek: China's Eternal First Lady =

Biography of Soong Meiling

Madame Chiang Kai-shek: China's Eternal First Lady is a book written by Laura Tyson Li about Soong Mei-ling, wife of modern China wartime leader Chiang Kai-shek.

== Description ==
Laura Tyson Li called Soong Mei-ling "one of the most powerful and fascinating women of the twentieth century", who was, beside the wife of China's wartime leader Generalissimo Chiang Kai-shek, also his "chief adviser, interpreter, and propagandist".

=== Publisher ===
The book was published by Atlantic Monthly Press on August 31, 2006, with ISBN 0-87113-933-2.
