= Yu Keping =

Chinese scholar and political advisor

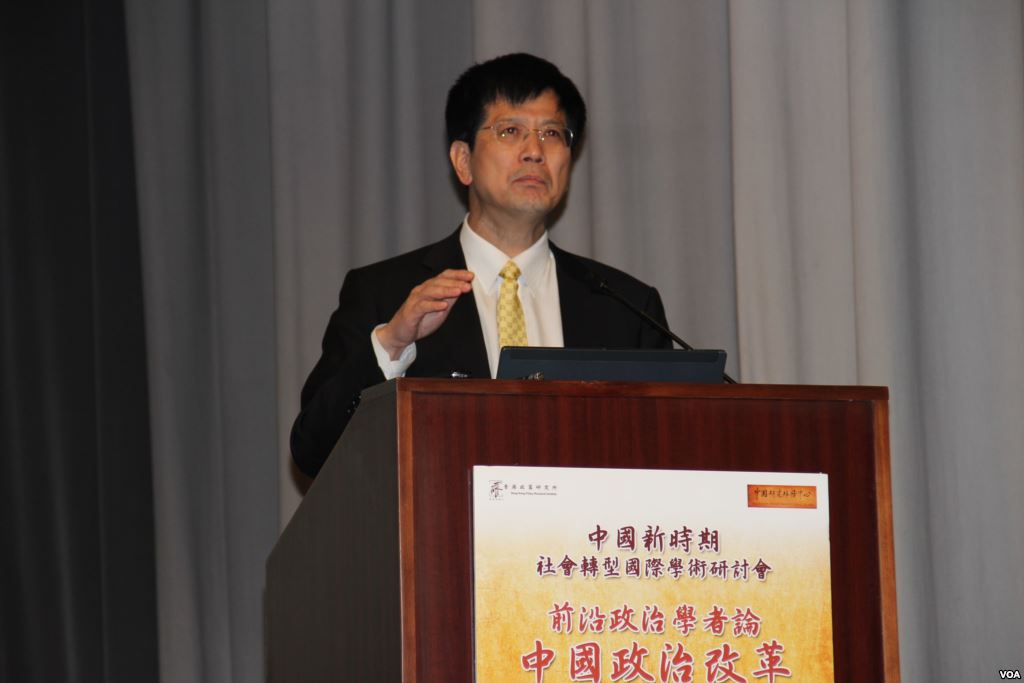
Keping Yu in 2013

Yu Keping (Chinese: 俞可平) is the Director of the Center for Chinese Government Innovations at Peking University. He is a noted scholar, having written many books including Democracy is a Good Thing. In addition to his academic work he has also acted as an advisor on political reforms to the Chinese government.

Yu is also the New World Senior Fellow in the Ash Center for Democratic Governance and Innovation in the John F. Kennedy School of Government, Harvard University.

Yu is a major contributor to Chinese thinking on good governance. Yu helped introduce formative texts in this area, like the World Bank's 1992 Government and Development Report to Chinese audiences.

Yu contends that the retreat of state power reduces bureaucratic inefficiency and can therefore increase good governance.

Yu's text Democracy is a Good Thing discusses issues like civil society and Western democracy.

== Writings ==
Books

- Yu, K. (2010). Democracy and the Rule of Law in China Leiden: Brill
- Yu, K. (2009). Democracy is a good thing: Essays on politics, society, and culture in contemporary China. Washington, D.C: Brookings Institution Press.
