= Nick Knight (professor) =

Australian academic

Nicholas Knight was, from 1981 to 2008, Professor of Asian Studies at Griffith University, Brisbane, Australia. Knight obtained a Bachelor of Arts (Honours) from the University of Queensland (1974), and a Master of Science (in Chinese Politics) (1977) and Doctor of Philosophy (1983), both from the School of Oriental and African Studies, at the University of London.

Professor Knight has published widely on ideology in China, particularly the thought of Mao Zedong, leader of the Chinese Communist Revolution. He has also published on the way in which globalisation is perceived and debated in contemporary China.

Professor Knight has also published on problems of postgraduate education and supervision.

== Views ==
Writing on the Sinicization of Marxism, Knight states that this was Mao's search for a method to apply what Marxism contends to be universal truths to the Chinese context without abandoning Marxism's universality.

== Selected bibliography ==
- Nick Knight, Understanding Australia’s Neighbours: An Introduction to East and Southeast Asia (Melbourne: Cambridge University Press, 2004).
- Nick Knight, Marxist Philosophy in China: From Qu Qiubai to Mao Zedong, 1923-1945 (Dordrecht: Springer, 2005).
- Nick Knight, Rethinking Mao: Explorations in Mao Zedong’s Thought (Lanham, MD: Lexington Books, 2007).
- Michael Heazle and Nick Knight (eds), China-Japan Relations in the Twenty-first Century: Towards a Future Past? (Cheltenham: Edward Elgar, 2007).
- Nick Knight, Imagining Globalisation in China: Debates on Ideology, Politics and Culture (Cheltenham, UK: Edward Elgar, 2008).
