= Antonio Piñero =

Spanish philologist, writer, and historian

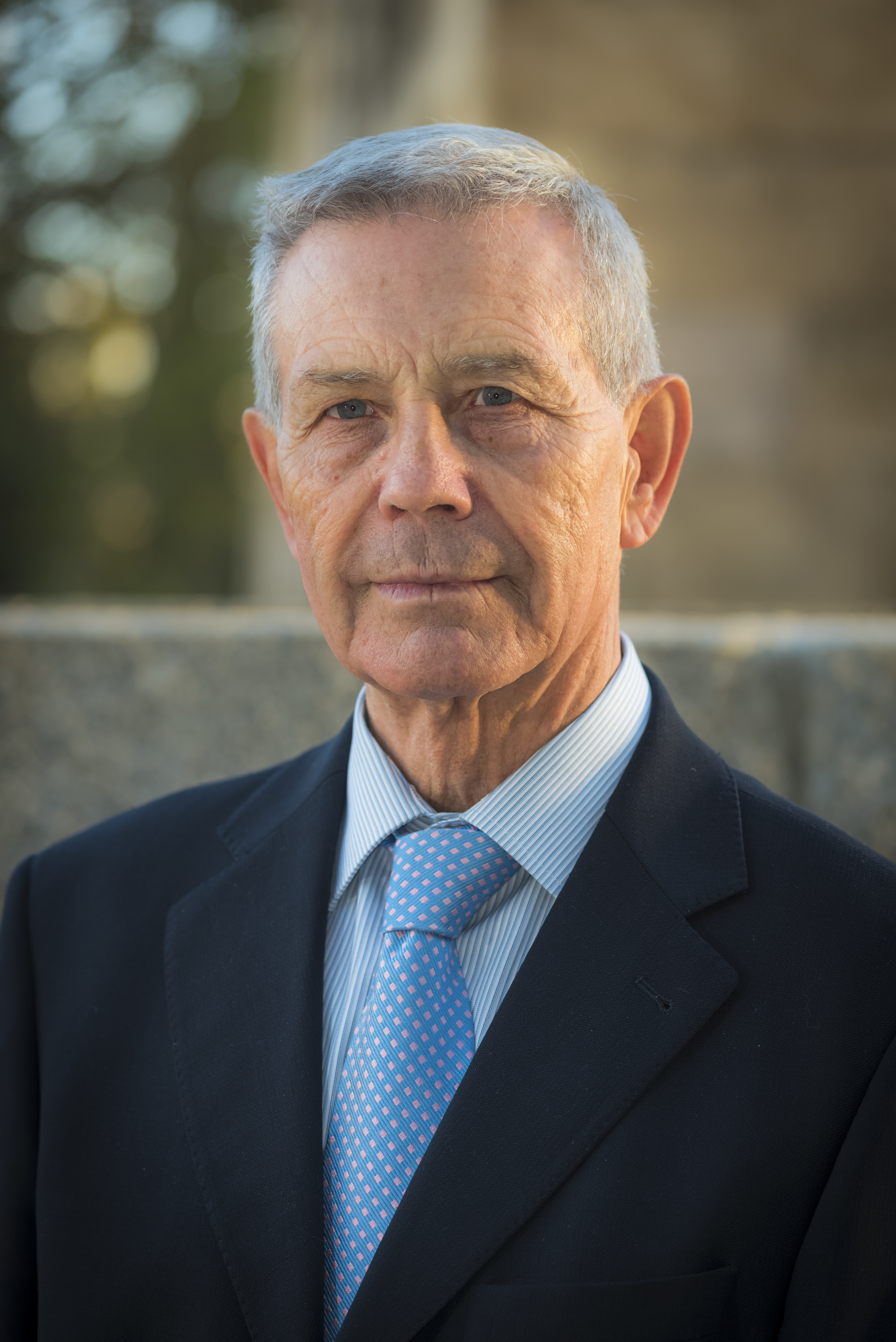
- Born: 14 August 1941; Chipiona
- Occupations: philologist, writer, and historian
- Writing career
- Language: Spanish language
- Website: www.antoniopinero.com

Antonio Piñero Sáenz (14 August 1941 in Chipiona, Spain) is a Spanish philologist, writer, and historian, specializing in the Judaism before Christianity, the life of Jesus of Nazareth, the founding of Christianity, and language and literature of the New Testament and early Christianity from a scientific perspective. He is especially known in the Spanish-speaking world for the authorship of numerous books and research articles, and for his active outreach efforts.

== Biography ==
He was born in the town of Chipiona in the province of Cádiz (Spain). He graduated in pure philosophy from the Complutense University of Madrid in 1968, in classical philology from the University of Salamanca in 1970, and in trilingual biblical philology from the Pontifical University of Salamanca in 1976. In 1974 he defended his doctoral thesis in classical philology, supervised by the philologist Luis Gil Fernández, and entitled Teopneustia, estudio sobre la inspiración en los escritores de los siglos I y II ("Teopneustia, study on inspiration from writers of the 1st and 2nd centuries") at the Complutense University of Madrid (Luis Vives award granted), although he completed most of his doctorate in Germany. Since 1970 he worked as a teacher at this same university, and in 1983 he became full professor. He is currently full professor emeritus of Greek philology.

In 2016, he received the Trithemius award from the Sociedad de Estudios e Investigaciones Spagyricas y la Editorial Tritemio, for his contribution to the world of culture and his endeavour in all his facets to teacher, researcher and writer.

== Academic activities ==
As a result of his work in translating the non-canonical gospels, New Testament academic research, broad participation in dissemination activities and numerous publications, Piñero has become one of the most influential agnostic Spanish exegetes and authors in the study of the early Christianity (mainly the 1st and 2nd centuries). In his work he focuses on the historical Jesus, therefore he tries to separate the religious interpretation from the historical reconstruction of Jesus through historical and philological methods. Similarly, he also addresses the first steps of the early Christianity trying to clarify the evolution of the first communities of followers of Jesus of Nazareth.

=== Historical existence of Jesus ===
One of the recurring topics of his works is the study of the figure of Jesus of Nazareth. According to the analysis of the texts in Judea in the 1st century, Piñero defends the existence of a historical Jesus, but differentiated from the literary Jesus Christ of the gospels. The historical Jesus, according to his research, would be a craftsman from Galilee and religious leader with limited impact while he was alive. After his death, he would be magnified, idealized and divinized, giving rise to the heavenly and mythological Christ in the gospels and Christianity. Thus, according to Piñero, the vast majority of the main ideas of Christianity were born in a Jewish world through a totally natural process, and with the passage of time the human being called these ideas dogmas.

=== Translation work ===
In his work as a translator since 1983 he has coordinated a project in which a team of specialists carried out the translation of all the known gospels into Spanish, including canonical and non-canonical. This project has involved research on the social and political context that surrounded the original writings and the full translation of the texts from the original languages: Latin, Greek, Hebrew, Syriac, Coptic and Arabic. It concluded in 2009 when the work containing the latest-translated Apocryphal Gospels is published. This translation work has been recognized as a valuable study tool.

=== Theology of Paul the Apostle ===
Piñero proposes a hypothesis to interpret, as something coherent, the conditions for salvation reported by Pablo. According to this hypothesis the Law of Moses, as Paul preaches it, is complex and is divided into two parts: an eternal, natural and obligatory law for all, and a specific law for the Jews in the messianic age.

- The eternal, natural and obligatory law for all (Jews and Gentiles) is the Decalogue (The Ten Commandments), which governs correct relationships between humans, and which in Pauline ethics is translated into the norms referring to the general behavior of all humans.
- The specific law is the part of the Law of Moses that is not present in the Decalogue. Therefore, it includes the laws that contemplate circumcision, food standards and ritual purity with everything required around the temple. This part of the Mosaic Law does not affect Gentiles (that is, non-Jews), since it is specifically oriented to the chosen people, the Jews. Therefore, even Jews called to faith in the Messiah must continue to live as Jews, that is, fulfilling the full Law of Moses.

Through this interpretive hypothesis, Piñero makes compatible two aspects of Paul's theology: his insistence on denying the written Law (for example, circumcision) and stating that Jews are naturally subject to the entire Mosaic Law.

=== Oureach activities ===
Piñero has been characterized by his work of dissemination in various media, such as, radio, TV and Internet. In 2009 he participated as an advisor in the making of the film El discípulo ("The disciple"), whose plot addresses the life of Jesus of Nazareth.

== Controversies ==
Given the popular and general audience of his seminars and published books on the person of Jesus of Nazareth, his conclusions are controversial for part of society. Contrary to the belief of some atheists, Piñero firmly states the historical existence of Jesus, although he differentiates the historical person (on whom he focuses his attention) from the heavenly figure. On the other hand, the segregation of the historical Jesus from the heavenly one also raises criticism from the Christian faithful, mainly in Spain. The argument of the latter is that, contrary to the approach adopted by Piñero, the religious view cannot be separated from a historical interpretation of the New Testament.

== Works ==
Some of his best-known books are:

- Gnosis. Conocimiento de lo oculto. La gnosis judía y cristiana explicada por sus textos, Trotta, 2025.
- Aproximación al Jesús histórico, Trotta, 2018.
- El Nuevo Testamento: Introducción al estudio de los primeros escritos cristianos, Herder, 2019.
- El otro Jesús: vida de Jesús según los evangelios apócrifos, Herder, 2018.
- Guía para entender a Pablo de Tarso: Una interpretación del pensamiento paulino, Trotta, 2018.
- Apócrifos del Antiguo y del Nuevo Testamento, Alianza Editorial, 2016.
- Guía para entender el Nuevo Testamento, Trotta, 2013.
- Jesús de Nazaret: El hombre de las cien caras. Textos canónicos y apócrifos, Edaf, 2012.
- Jesús y las mujeres, Trotta, 2014.
- Año I. Israel y su mundo cuando nació Jesús, Ediciones del laberinto, 2008.
- Los cristianismos derrotados: ¿Cuál fue el pensamiento de los primeros cristianos heréticos y heterodoxos?, Edaf, 2007. (1st prize Finis Terrae 2007 for heterodox essay)
- Los apocalipsis, Edaf, 2007.

=== Co-authored books ===
- José Luis Corral and Antonio Piñero: El trono maldito, Editorial Planeta, 2014 (novel).
- Eugenio Gómez Segura and Antonio Piñero: El Juicio Final, Edaf, 2010.
- Antonio Piñero and Eugenio Gómez Segura: La verdadera historia de la pasión, Edaf, 2008

=== Collective books ===
- Los libros del Nuevo Testamento. Traducción y comentario. Trotta, 2021.
- Orígenes del cristianismo. Herder, 2018 (reedition).
- Fuentes del cristianismo. Tradiciones primitivas sobre Jesús. Herder, 2018 (reedition).
- Todos los evangelios. Traducción íntegra de todos los textos evangélicos conocidos, tanto canónicos como apócrifos. Editor: Antonio Piñero. Edaf, 2009.
- ¿Existió Jesús realmente?. Editor: Antonio Piñero. Raíces, 2008.
- Textos gnósticos. Biblioteca de Nag Hammadi I. Tratados filosóficos y cosmológicos (volume I). Editors: Antonio Piñero, Francisco García Bazán and José Montserrat Torrents, Trotta, 2000.
- Textos gnósticos. Biblioteca de Nag Hammadi II. Evangelios, Hechos, Carta (volume II). Editors: Antonio Piñero, Francisco García Bazán and José Montserrat Torrents, Trotta, 2004.
- Textos gnósticos. Biblioteca de Nag Hammadi III. Apocalipsis y otros escritos (volume III). Editors: Antonio Piñero, Francisco García Bazán and José Montserrat Torrents, Trotta, 2009.
- Apócrifos del Antiguo Testamento. (6 volumes. I: Introducción; II: Historias; III Literatura sapiencial; IV Ciclo de Henoc; V: Literatura de testamentos; VI: Apocalipsis) Ediciones Cristiandad, 1982-2009. The last volume (VII) is in preparation: Remaining Jewish works from the 2nd-1st centuries BC. and Complete indexes of the 7 volumes).
- Hechos Apócrifos de los Apóstoles. (volumes I-III, co-authored with Gonzalo del Cerro: Greek and Latin texts, plus translations from Coptic and Syriac, with translation into Spanish, introductions and notes) Biblioteca Autores Cristianos, 2005-2011.

=== Books in English ===
- Antonio Piñero and Jesús Peláez: The Study of the New Testament: A Comprehensive Introduction, Deo Publishing, 2003. (translation)
- The Hidden Life of Jesus, Cascade Books, 2016. (translated by Thomas W. Hudgins)
