= Qian Haiyue =

Chinese historian (1901–1968)

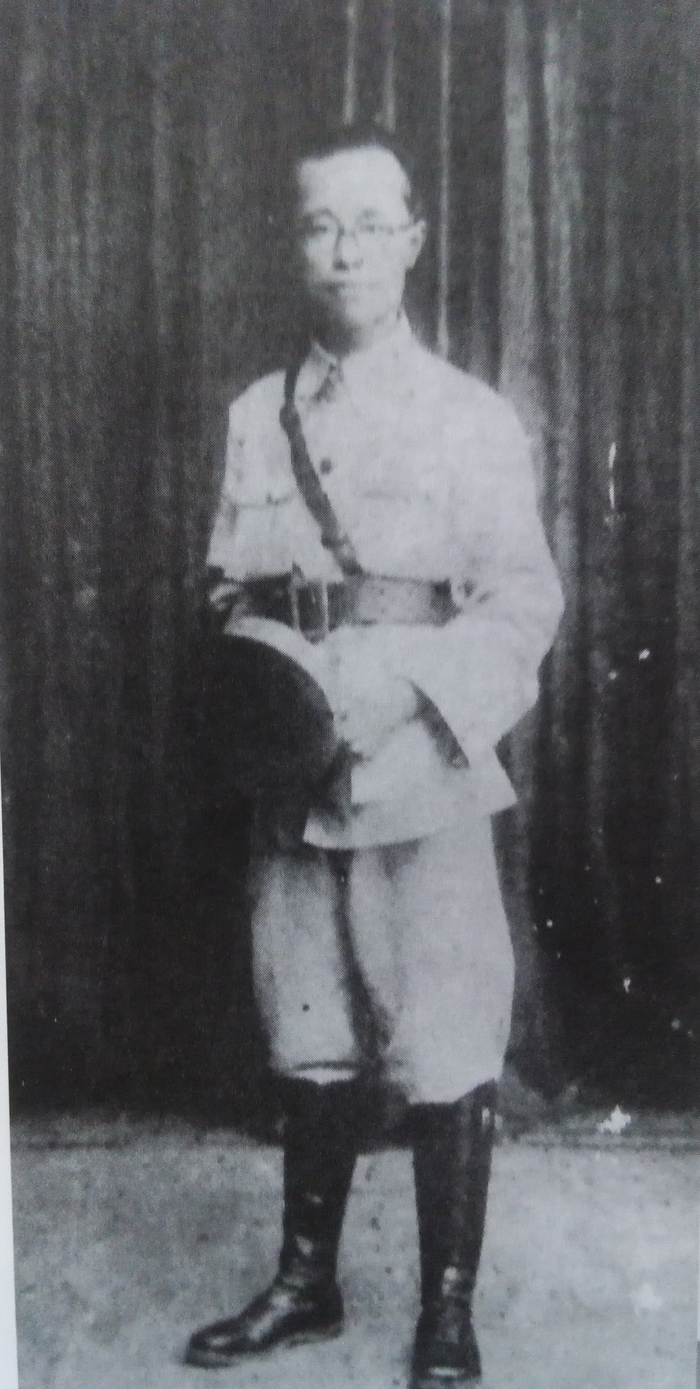
Qian Haiyue in uniform

Qian Haiyue (simplified Chinese: 钱海岳; traditional Chinese: 錢海岳; 1901 – 14 January 1968) was a Chinese historian who focused on the Southern Ming dynasty.

== Early life ==
Qian was born in the city of Wuxi Jiangsu Province. Qian's father held the Jinshi title under the imperial exams system. In 1925, Qian graduated from Peking University after completing his studies under celebrated scholars such as Liang Qichao and Gu Hongming.

== Career ==
He is best known for his work "History of Southern Ming dynasty".

By 1943, he was the Principal of Xinjiang University. Qian was a victim of the Cultural Revolution in 1968. After he was wrongly accused of supporting the Kuomintang, Qian was thrown off the main gate of the Xiao Mausoleum, the tomb of the first Ming emperor, because he was an active advocate of the study of Ming history.
