= History of the Ming dynasty =

The Ming dynasty (1368–1644) was an imperial dynasty of China that ruled after the fall of the Mongol-led Yuan dynasty. It was the last imperial dynasty of China ruled by the Han people, the majority ethnic group in China. At its height, the Ming dynasty had a population of 160 million people, while some assert the population could actually have been as large as 200 million.

The founder of the dynasty was Zhu Yuanzhang, one of the leaders of the uprising against the Yuan dynasty. In 1368, he declared himself emperor and adopted the era name "Hongwu" for his reign, naming the dynasty he founded "Ming", meaning "Brilliant." In the same year, the capital of the Yuan, Dadu (present-day Beijing), was captured. The Hongwu Emperor aimed to create a society based on self-sufficient rural communities and to limit the influence of merchants. Under his rule, agriculture was revitalized and a network of roads was constructed for both military and administrative purposes. He also maintained a standing army of at least one million soldiers.

During the reign of the Yongle Emperor (r. 1402–1424), the Grand Canal was rebuilt and a new capital, Beijing, was established. This new capital included the Forbidden City, which served as the imperial residence for the emperor and his family. Between 1405 and 1433, Admiral Zheng He (1371–1433) led a series of seven expeditions with a newly built, enormous fleet. These expeditions were international tributary missions that reached the coasts of Southeast Asia and the shores of the Indian Ocean, as far as Egypt and Mozambique. In 1449, the Chinese forces were defeated by the Mongols in the Battle of Tumu, resulting in the capture of Emperor Yingzong. This event marked the end of China's military superiority over the nomads from the north. To counter this threat, the Great Wall of China was expanded at a tremendous cost starting in 1474.

Since the 16th century, trade between China and Europe and Japan had been steadily growing. China primarily exported silk and porcelain, while importing silver as the main form of economic exchange, replacing copper coins and banknotes. However, in the 17th century, a combination of climate changes and poor economic policies led to famines and epidemics. This, coupled with a decline in government authority, resulted in numerous uprisings throughout the empire. In 1644, the rebel army successfully captured Beijing, leading to the suicide of the last Ming emperor, Chongzhen (r. 1627–1644). The leader of the uprising, Li Zicheng, declared himself the emperor of the new Shun dynasty. However, after only a month, Manchu troops took control of Beijing, marking the beginning of the Manchu-led Qing dynasty's rule in China. The Ming dynasty was able to maintain control in southern China until 1662.

== Founding ==
=== Revolt and rebel rivalry ===
The Mongol-led Yuan dynasty (1279–1368) ruled China before the establishment of the Ming dynasty. Alongside institutionalized ethnic discrimination against the Han people that stirred resentment and rebellion, other explanations for the Yuan's demise included overtaxing areas hard-hit by crop failure, inflation, and massive flooding of the Yellow River caused by the abandonment of irrigation projects. Consequently, agriculture and the economy were in shambles and rebellion broke out among the hundreds of thousands of peasants called upon to work on repairing the dikes of the Yellow River.

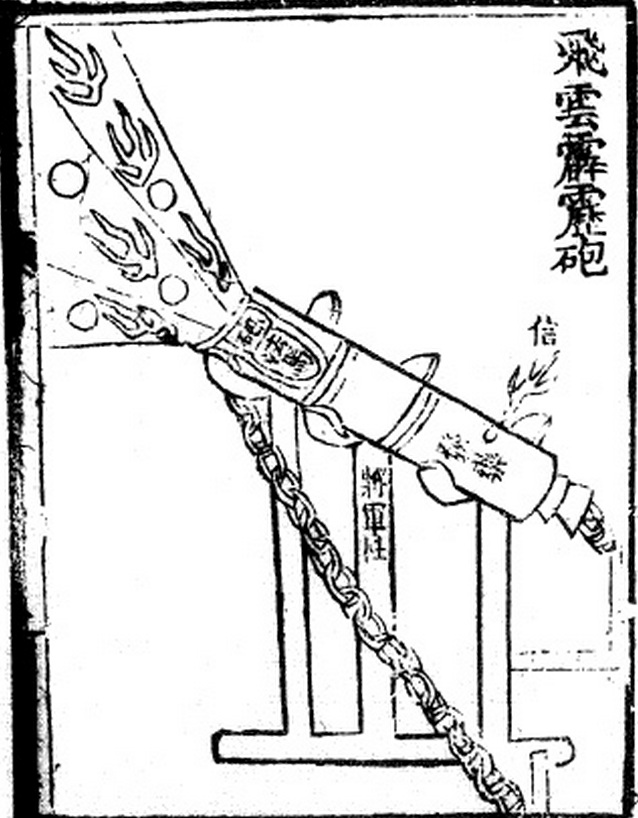
A cannon from the Huolongjing, compiled by Jiao Yu and Liu Bowen before the latter's death in 1375.

A number of ethnic Han groups revolted, including the Red Turbans in 1351. The Red Turbans were affiliated with the Buddhist secret society of the White Lotus, which propagated Manichean beliefs in the struggle of good against evil and worship of the Maitreya Buddha. Zhu Yuanzhang was a penniless peasant and Buddhist monk who joined the Red Turbans in 1352, but soon gained a reputation after marrying the foster daughter of a rebel commander. In 1356 Zhu's rebel force captured the city of Nanjing, which he would later establish as the capital of the Ming dynasty.

With the Yuan dynasty crumbling, competing rebel groups began to fight for control over China and the right to establish their own imperial dynasty. In 1363, at the Battle of Lake Poyang, Zhu Yuanzhang emerged victorious over his main rival and leader of the Han faction, Chen Youliang. Despite being outnumbered by more than three times, Zhu's fleet of 200,000 sailors defeated the Han fleet of an estimated 650,000 sailors. This triumph was attributed, in part, to the strategic use of fire ships during the battle. By defeating the last opposing rebel faction, Zhu Yuanzhang gained control over the Yangtze River basin and solidified his power in southern China. The suspicious death of Han Lin'er, the dynastic head of the Red Turbans, while at Zhu's court in 1367, cleared the way for his ascent to the imperial throne. In 1368, Zhu Yuanzhang declared himself emperor and sent an army to capture the Yuan capital of Dadu (present-day Beijing). The last Yuan emperor fled north to Shangdu, and the Yuan palaces in Dadu were destroyed; the city was renamed Beiping in the same year.

Instead of the traditional method of naming a dynasty after the place of origin of its founder, Zhu Yuanzhang's choice of "Ming" or "Brilliant" for his dynasty followed a Mongol precedent of an uplifting title. Zhu Yuanzhang also took "Hongwu", or "Vastly Martial", as his reign title. Although the White Lotus had fomented his rise to power, the Emperor later denied that he had ever been a member of their organization and suppressed the religious movement after he became emperor.

=== Reign of the Hongwu Emperor ===
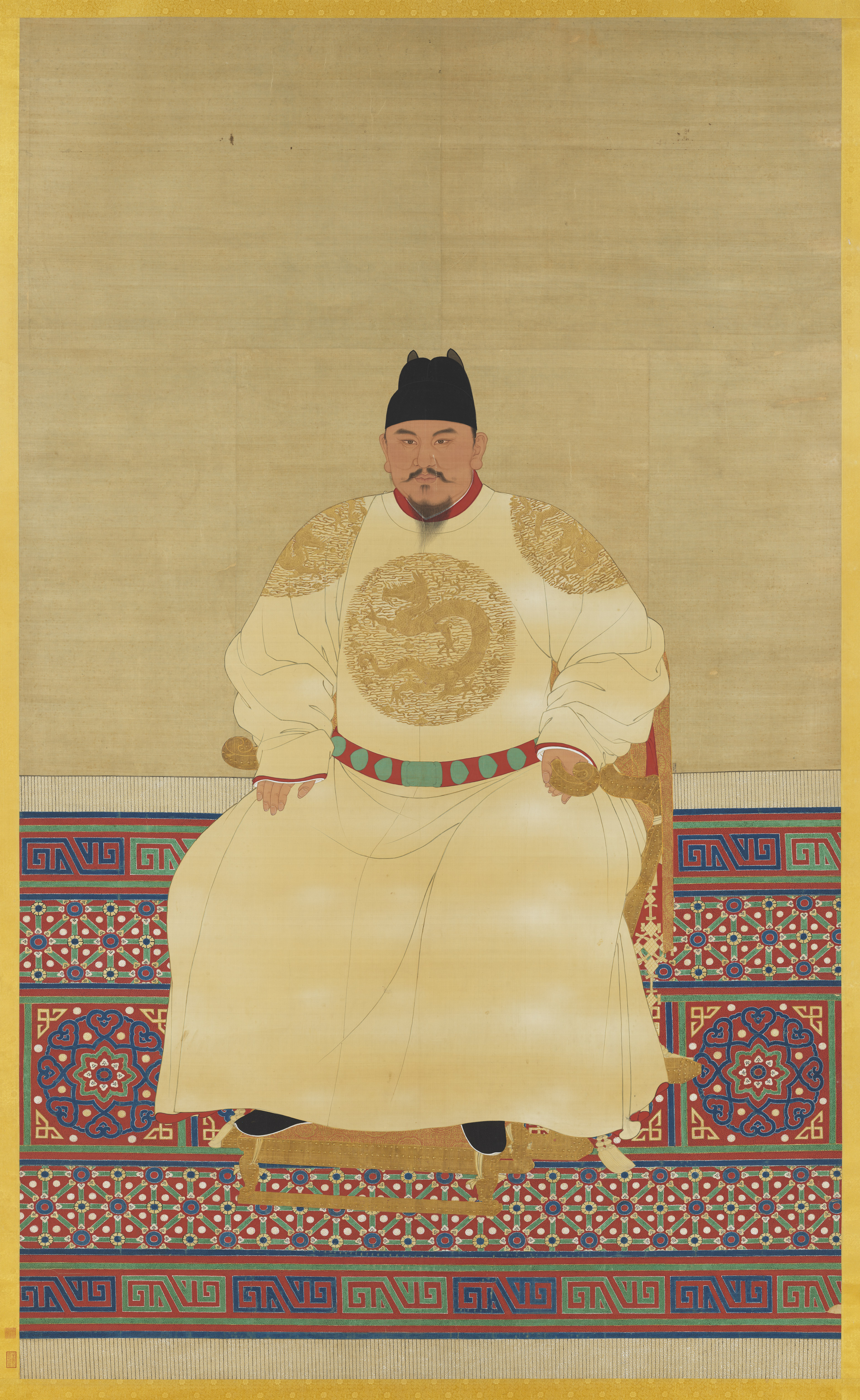
Portrait of the Hongwu Emperor (r. 1368–1398)

The Hongwu Emperor immediately set to rebuilding state infrastructure. He built a 48 km (30 mi) long wall around Nanjing, as well as new palaces and government halls. The History of Ming—the official dynastic history compiled in 1739 by the subsequent Manchu-led Qing dynasty (1644–1912)—states that as early as 1364 Zhu Yuanzhang had begun drafting a new Confucian law code known as the Daming Lu, which was completed by 1397 and repeated certain clauses found in the old Tang Code of 653. The Hongwu Emperor organized a military system known as the weisuo, which was similar to the fubing system of the Tang dynasty (618–907). The goal was to have soldiers become self-reliant farmers in order to sustain themselves while not fighting or training. This system was also similar to the Yuan dynasty military organization of hereditary military households and a hereditary nobility of commanders. The system of the self-sufficient agricultural soldier, however, was largely a farce; infrequent rations and awards were not enough to sustain the troops, and many deserted their ranks if they weren't located in the heavily supplied frontier.

Although a Confucian, the Hongwu Emperor had a deep distrust for the scholar-officials of the gentry class and was not afraid to have them beaten in court for offenses. In favor of Confucian learning and the civil service, the Emperor ordered every county magistrate to open a Confucian school in 1369—following the tradition of a nationwide school system first established by Emperor Ping of Han (9 BC–5 AD). However, he halted the civil service examinations in 1373 after complaining that the 120 scholar-officials who obtained a jinshi degree were incompetent ministers. After the examinations were reinstated in 1384, he had the chief examiner executed after it was discovered that he allowed only candidates from the south to be granted jinshi degrees. In 1380, the Hongwu Emperor had the Chancellor Hu Weiyong executed upon suspicion of a conspiracy plot to overthrow him; after that the Emperor abolished the Chancellery and assumed this role as chief executive and emperor. With a growing amount of suspicion for his ministers and subjects, the Hongwu Emperor established the Jinyiwei, a network of secret police drawn from his own palace guard. They were partly responsible for the loss of 100,000 lives in several major purges over three decades of his rule.

=== North-Western Frontier ===
Multiple conflicts arose with the Ming dynasty fighting against the Uyghur Kingdom of Turpan and Oirat Mongols on the Northwestern Border, near Gansu, Turpan, and Hami. The Ming dynasty took control of Hami (under a small kingdom called Qara Del) in 1404 and turned it into Hami Prefecture In 1406, the Ming dynasty defeated the ruler of Turpan, which would lead to a lengthy war. The Moghul ruler of Turpan Yunus Khan, also known as Ḥājjī `Ali (ruled 1462–78), unified Moghulistan (roughly corresponding to today's Eastern Xinjiang) under his authority in 1472. Asserting his newfound power, Ḥājjī `Ali sought redress of old grievances between the Turpanians and Ming China began over the restrictive tributary trade system. Tensions rose, and in 1473 he led a campaign east to confront China, even succeeding in capturing Hami from the Oirat Mongol ruler Henshen. Ali traded control of Hami with the Ming, then Henshen's Mongols, in numerous battles spanning the reigns of his son Ahmed and his grandson Mansur in a drawn-out and complex series of conflicts now known as the Ming–Turpan conflict.

=== South-Western Frontier ===
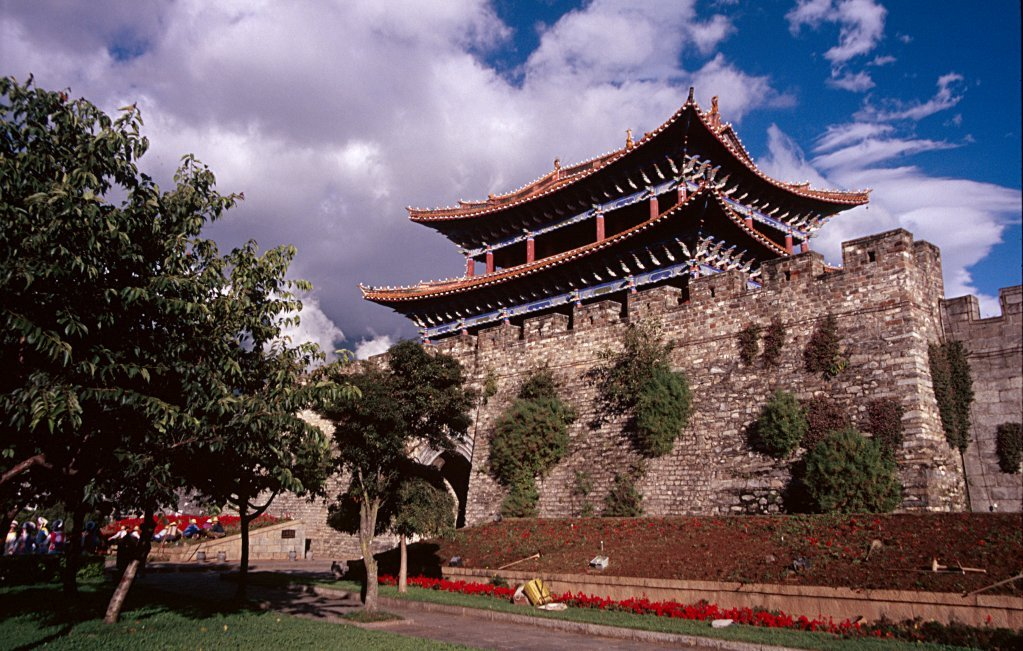
The old south gate of Dali, Yunnan, which was established as a Chinese-style city in 1382 shortly after the Ming conquest of the region.

In 1381, the Ming dynasty annexed the areas of the southwest that had once been part of the Kingdom of Dali, which was annihilated by the Mongols in the 1250s and became established as the Yunnan Province under Yuan dynasty later on. By the end of the 14th century, some 200,000 military colonists settled some 2,000,000 mu (350,000 acres) of land in what is now Yunnan and Guizhou. Roughly half a million more Chinese settlers came in later periods; these migrations caused a major shift in the ethnic make-up of the region, since more than half of the roughly 3,000,000 inhabitants at the beginning of the Ming dynasty were non-Han peoples. In this region, the Ming government adopted a policy of dual administration. Areas with majority ethnic Chinese were governed according to Ming laws and policies; areas where native tribal groups dominated had their own set of laws while tribal chiefs promised to maintain order and send tribute to the Ming court in return for needed goods. From 1464 to 1466, the Miao and Yao people of Guangxi, Guangdong, Sichuan, Hunan, and Guizhou revolted against what they saw as oppressive government rule. The Ming government responded by sending an army of 30,000 troops (including 1,000 Mongols) to join the 160,000 local troops of Guangxi and crushed the rebellion. After the scholar and philosopher Wang Yangming (1472–1529) suppressed another rebellion in the region, he advocated joint administration of Chinese and local ethnic groups in order to bring about sinification in the local peoples' culture.

=== Relations with Tibet ===
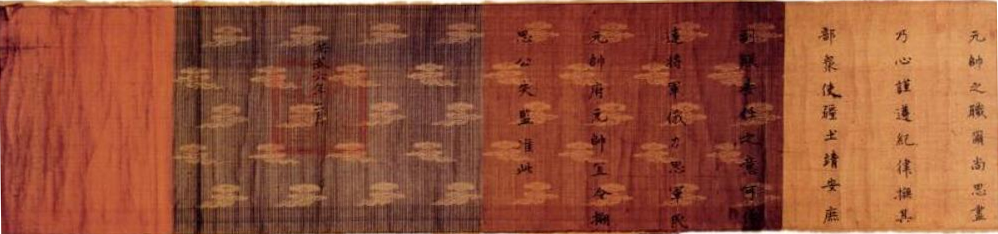
Edict of the Hongwu Emperor granting the title General of the Ngari Military and Civil Wanhu Office to Tibetan leader Choskunskyabs in 1373

The History of Ming states that the Ming established itinerant commanderies overseeing Tibetan administration while also renewing titles of ex-Yuan dynasty officials from Tibet and conferring new princely titles on leaders of Tibet's Buddhist sects. However, Turrell V. Wylie states that censorship in the Mingshi in favor of bolstering the Ming emperor's prestige and reputation at all costs obfuscates the nuanced history of Sino-Tibetan relations during the Ming era. Modern scholars still debate on whether or not the Ming dynasty really had sovereignty over Tibet at all, as some believe it was a relationship of loose suzerainty which was largely cut off when the Jiajing Emperor (r. 1521–1567) persecuted Buddhism in favor of Daoism at court. Helmut Hoffman states that the Ming upheld the facade of rule over Tibet through periodic missions of "tribute emissaries" to the Ming court and by granting nominal titles to ruling lamas, but did not actually interfere in Tibetan governance. Wang Jiawei and Nyima Gyaincain disagree, stating that Ming China had sovereignty over Tibetans who did not inherit Ming titles, but were forced to travel to Beijing to renew them. Melvyn C. Goldstein writes that the Ming had no real administrative authority over Tibet since the various titles given to Tibetan leaders already in power did not confer authority as earlier Mongol Yuan titles had; according to him, "the Ming emperors merely recognized political reality." Some scholars argue that the significant religious nature of the relationship of the Ming court with Tibetan lamas is underrepresented in modern scholarship. Others underscore the commercial aspect of the relationship, noting the Ming dynasty's insufficient number of horses and the need to maintain the tea-horse trade with Tibet. Scholars also debate on how much power and influence—if any—the Ming dynasty court had over the de facto successive ruling families of Tibet, the Phagmodru (1354–1436), Rinbung (1436–1565), and Tsangpa (1565–1642).

The Ming initiated sporadic armed intervention in Tibet during the 14th century, while at times the Tibetans also used successful armed resistance against Ming forays. Patricia Ebrey, Thomas Laird, Wang Jiawei, and Nyima Gyaincain all point out that the Ming dynasty did not garrison permanent troops in Tibet, unlike the former Yuan dynasty. The Wanli Emperor (r. 1572–1620) made attempts to reestablish Sino-Tibetan relations in the wake of a Mongol-Tibetan alliance initiated in 1578, the latter of which affected the foreign policy of the subsequent Qing dynasty in their support for the Dalai Lama of the Yellow Hat sect. By the late 16th century, the Mongols proved to be successful armed protectors of the Yellow Hat Dalai Lama after their increasing presence in the Amdo region, culminating in Güshi Khan's (1582–1655) conquest of Tibet in 1642.

== The Hongwu Emperor's vision, commercialization, and reversing his policies ==
=== Unification and resettlement ===
According to historian Timothy Brook, the Hongwu Emperor attempted to hinder social mobility by creating rigid, state-regulated boundaries between rural counties and larger cities. He also made trade and travel difficult without government permission. Additionally, the Hongwu Emperor imposed strict moral codes by enforcing uniform clothing and a standardized way of speaking and writing, in order to prevent better-educated individuals from gaining an advantage. His distrust of the educated elite was matched by his disdain for the wealthiest merchants, resulting in the implementation of exceptionally high taxes on influential merchant families in the Suzhou area of Jiangsu. Thousands of wealthy families from the southeast were forced to relocate and settle around Nanjing, with strict restrictions on their ability to leave. In order to control their commercial activities, the Hongwu Emperor required merchants to list all their possessions every month. While his main goal was to limit the influence of merchants and landowners, some of his initiatives inadvertently allowed them to increase their wealth.

The mass resettlement system implemented by the Hongwu Emperor and the desire to avoid high taxes led to a rise in itinerant traders, peddlers, and laborers who were either employed or leased by landowners or merchants. By the mid-Ming dynasty, the forced settlement system was abandoned and local officials were instead responsible for registering seasonal workers in order to increase tax revenues. Despite the Hongwu Emperor's vision of a strict hierarchical system with four social groups (officials, farmers, artisans, and merchants), the reality was that the elite, consisting of wealthy landowners and merchants, held the most power and control over tenants, hired workers, domestic servants, and seasonal laborers.

=== Self-sufficient agriculture, surpluses, and urbanization ===
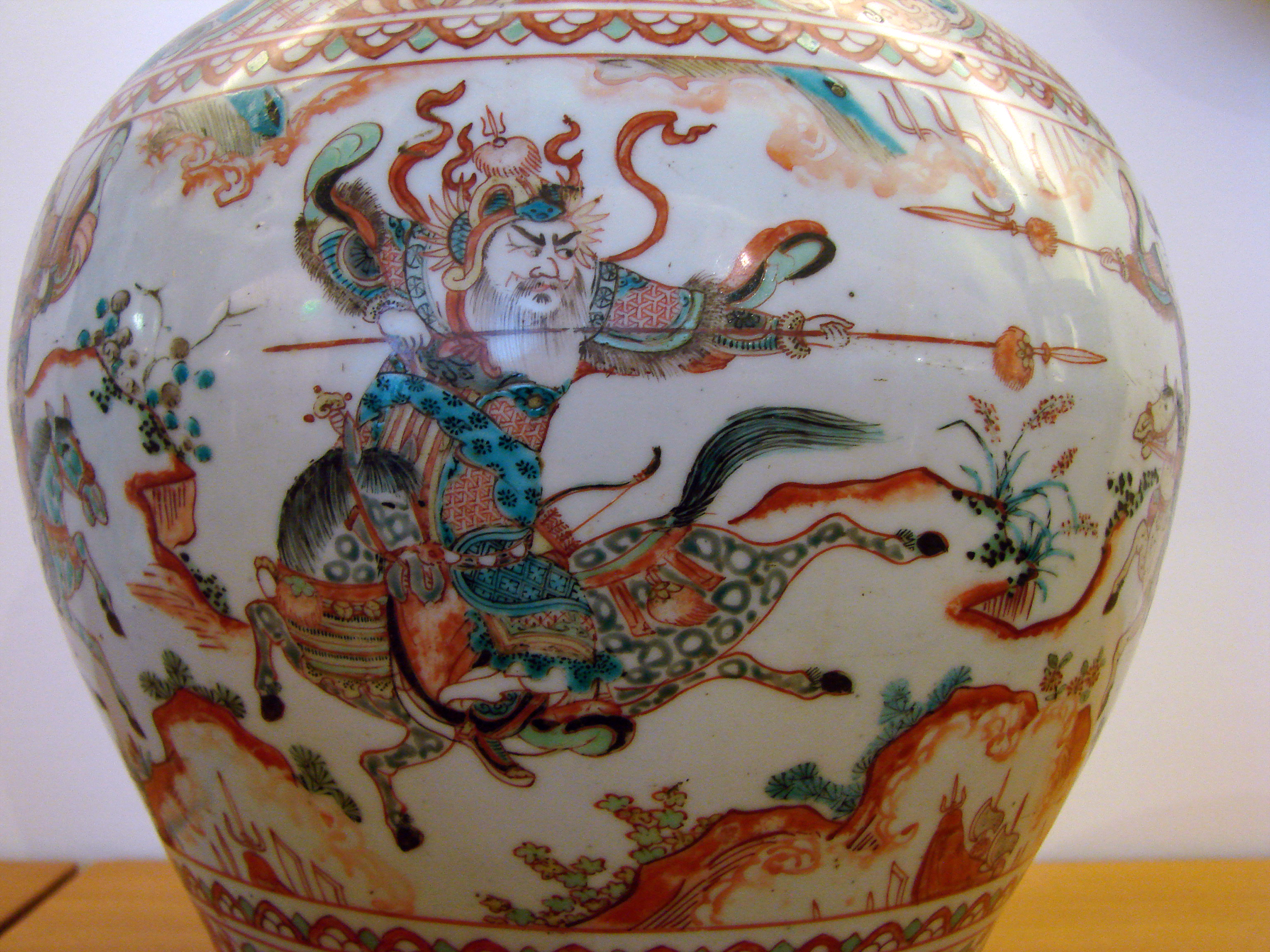
A Ming porcelain jar with a scene of cavalrymen fighting, from the reign of the Jiajing Emperor (1522–1566) – Guimet Museum, Paris. By the late Ming dynasty, Chinese society had transformed into a consumer society. The social elite were expected to possess the discernment to differentiate between high-quality products and inferior ones. They were also expected to be knowledgeable about rare and exotic plants suitable for their gardens.

The Hongwu Emperor's reforms aimed to support agriculture and increase agricultural production in order to create self-sufficient communities that did not rely on trade. The Emperor believed that trade would be limited to cities. However, the surplus of food generated by these reforms led farmers to sell their products. Initially, trade occurred along communication routes, but by the mid-Ming dynasty, farmers began selling their goods in nearby towns as well. As trade networks expanded to connect cities and villages, rural households also began participating in traditional urban crafts, such as weaving and the production of cotton and silk clothing. By the end of the Ming dynasty, conservative Confucianists expressed concern that the adoption of urban customs by peasants was undermining the traditional social order and leading to decadence.

The growing commercialization of social relations in China had a significant impact not only on farmers, but also on landowners, who were often the source of state officials. Traditionally, officials were expected to be humble and not use their position for personal gain. They were known for walking from their countryside homes to the cities where they worked. However, during the reign of the Zhengde Emperor (r. 1505–1521), officials began to travel in luxurious palanquins and acquire spacious houses in prestigious cities, abandoning their simple countryside lifestyles. By the end of the Ming dynasty, wealth had become the primary factor in determining social status, even more important than holding a high-ranking official position.

=== Fusion of the merchant and gentry classes ===
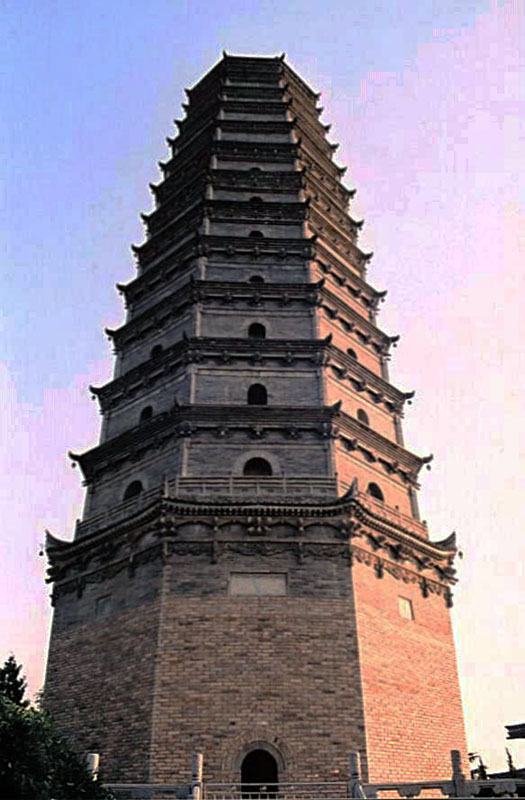
Pagoda of Famen Temple, built in 1579; the Chinese believed that building pagodas on certain sites according to geomantic principles brought about auspicious events; merchant-funding for such projects was needed by the late Ming period.

In the first half of the Ming era, scholar-officials would rarely mention the contribution of merchants in society while writing their local gazetteer; officials were certainly capable of funding their own public works projects, a symbol of their virtuous political leadership. However, by the second half of the Ming era it became common for officials to solicit money from merchants in order to fund their various projects, such as building bridges or establishing new schools of Confucian learning for the betterment of the gentry. From that point on the gazetteers began mentioning merchants and often in high esteem, since the wealth produced by their economic activity produced resources for the state as well as increased production of books needed for the education of the gentry. Merchants began taking on the highly cultured, connoisseur's attitude and cultivated traits of the gentry class, blurring the lines between merchant and gentry and paving the way for merchant families to produce scholar-officials. The roots of this social transformation and class indistinction could be found in the Song dynasty (960–1279), but it became much more pronounced in the Ming. Writings of family instructions for lineage groups in the late Ming period display the fact that one no longer inherited his position in the categorization of the four occupations (in descending order): gentry, farmers, artisans, and merchants.

=== Courier network and commercial growth ===
The Hongwu Emperor believed that only government couriers and lowly retail merchants should have the right to travel far outside their home town. Despite his efforts to impose this view, his building of an efficient communication network for his military and official personnel strengthened and fomented the rise of a potential commercial network running parallel to the courier network. The shipwrecked Korean Ch'oe Pu (1454–1504) remarked in 1488 how the locals along the eastern coasts of China did not know the exact distances between certain places, which was virtually exclusive knowledge of the Ministry of War and courier agents. This was in stark contrast to the late Ming period, when merchants not only traveled further distances to convey their goods, but also bribed courier officials to use their routes and even had printed geographical guides of commercial routes that imitated the couriers' maps.

=== An open market, silver, and Deng Maoqi's rebellion ===
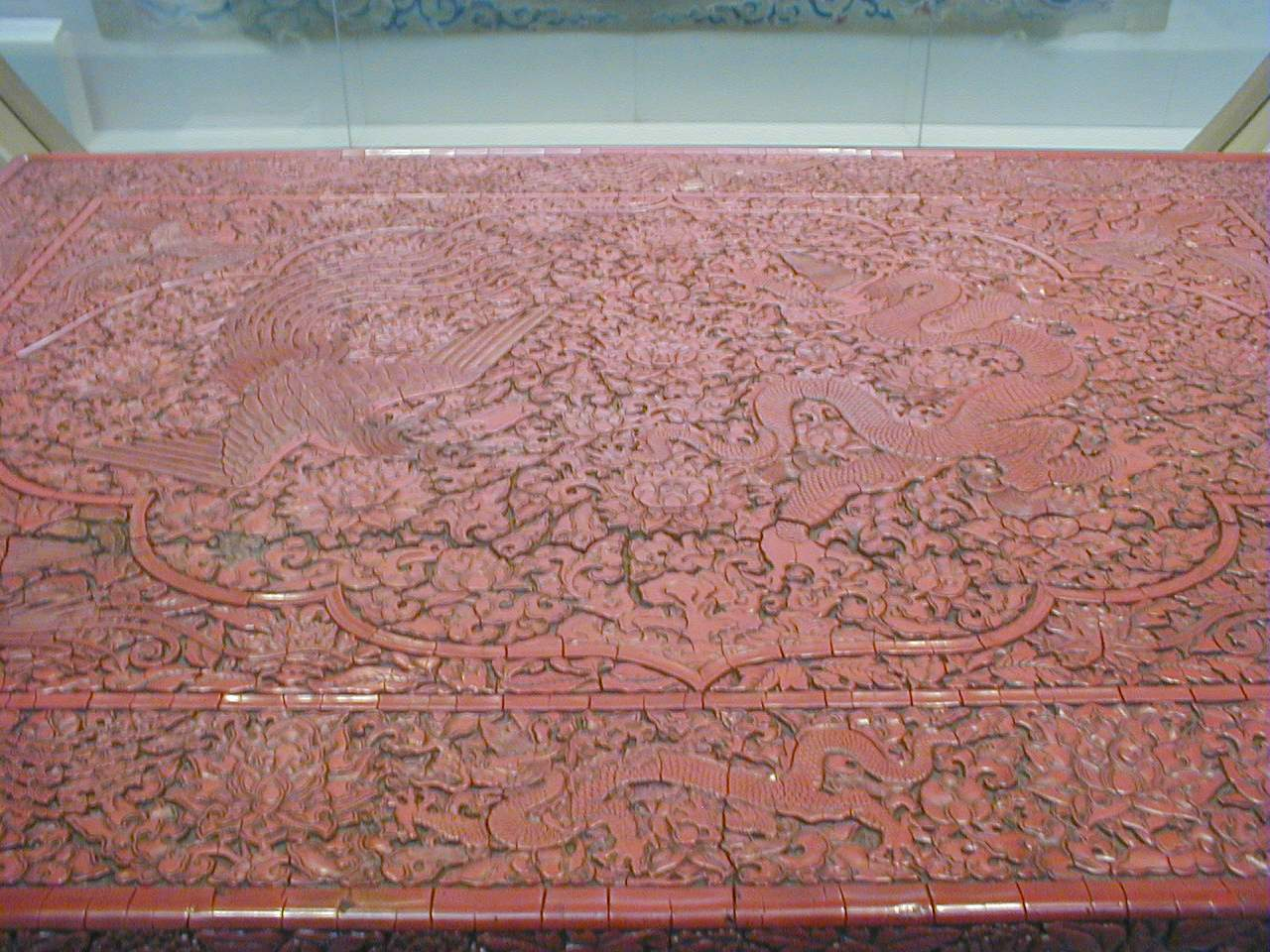
The only surviving piece of furniture from the "Orchard Factory" (the Imperial Lacquer Workshop) set up in Beijing in the early Ming dynasty. Decorated in dragons and phoenixes, it was made during the Xuande era (1426–1435). The imperial workshops in the Ming era were overseen by a eunuch bureau. (See closeup for detail)

The scholar-officials' dependence upon the economic activities of the merchants became more than a trend when it was semi-institutionalized by the state in the mid Ming era. Qiu Jun (1420–1495), a scholar-official from Hainan, argued that the state should only mitigate market affairs during times of pending crisis and that merchants were the best gauge in determining the strength of a nation's riches in resources. The government followed this guideline by the mid Ming era when it allowed merchants to take over the state monopoly of salt production. This was a gradual process where the state supplied northern frontier armies with enough grain by granting merchants licenses to trade in salt in return for their shipping services. The state realized that merchants could buy salt licenses with silver and in turn boost state revenues to the point where buying grain was not an issue.

Silver mining was increased dramatically during the reign of the Yongle Emperor (1402–1424); production of mined silver rose from 3007 kg (80,185 taels) in 1403 to 10,210 kg (272,262 taels) in 1409. The Hongxi Emperor (r. 1424–1425) attempted to scale back silver mining to restore the discredited paper currency, but this was a failure which his immediate successor, the Xuande Emperor (r. 1425–1435), remedied by continuing the Yongle Emperor's silver mining scheme. The governments of the Hongwu Emperor and Emperor Yingzong during his first reign (r. 1435–1449) attempted to cut the flow of silver into the economy in favor of paper currency, yet mining the precious metal simply became a lucrative illegal pursuit practiced by many.

The failure of these stern regulations against silver mining prompted ministers such as the censor Liu Hua (jinshi graduate in 1430) to support the baojia system of communal self-defense units to patrol areas and arrest 'mining bandits' (kuangzei). Deng Maoqi (died 1449), an overseer in this baojia defense units in Sha County of Fujian, abused local landlords who attempted to have him arrested; Deng responded by killing the local magistrate in 1447 and started a rebellion. By 1448, Deng's forces took control of several counties and were besieging the prefectural capital. The mobilization of local baojia units against Deng was largely a failure; in the end it took 50,000 government troops (including later Mongol rebels who sided with Cao Qin's rebellion in 1461), with food supplies supported by local wealthy elites, to put down Deng's rebellion and execute the so-called "King Who Eliminates Evil" in the spring of 1449. Many ministers blamed ministers such as Liu Hua for promoting the baojia system and thus allowing this disaster to occur. The historian Tanaka Masatoshi regarded "Deng's uprising as the first peasant rebellion that resisted the class relationship of rent rather than the depredations of officials, and therefore as the first genuinely class-based 'peasant warfare' in Chinese history."

The Hongwu Emperor was unaware of economic inflation even as he continued to hand out multitudes of banknotes as awards; by 1425, paper currency was worth only 0.025% to 0.014% its original value in the 14th century. The value of standard copper coinage dropped significantly as well due to counterfeit minting; by the 16th century, new maritime trade contacts with Europe provided massive amounts of imported silver, which increasingly became the common medium of exchange. As far back as 1436, a portion of the southern grain tax was commuted to silver, known as the Gold Floral Silver (jinhuayin). This was an effort to aid tax collection in counties where transportation of grain was made difficult by terrain, as well as provide tax relief to landowners. In 1581 the Single Whip Reform installed by Grand Secretary Zhang Juzheng (1525–1582) finally assessed taxes on the amount of land paid entirely in silver.

== Reign of the Yongle Emperor ==
Portrait of the Yongle Emperor (r. 1402–1424)

=== Rise to power ===
The Hongwu Emperor's grandson, Zhu Yunwen, assumed the throne as the Jianwen Emperor (r. 1398–1402) after the Hongwu Emperor's death in 1398. In a prelude to a three-year-long civil war beginning in 1399, the Jianwen Emperor became engaged in a political showdown with his uncle Zhu Di, the Prince of Yan. The Emperor was aware of the ambitions of his princely uncles, establishing measures to limit their authority. The militant Zhu Di, given charge over the area encompassing Beijing to watch the Mongols on the frontier, was the most feared of these princes. After the Jianwen Emperor arrested many of Zhu Di's associates, Zhu Di plotted a rebellion. Under the guise of rescuing the young Jianwen Emperor from corrupt officials, Zhu Di personally led forces in the revolt; the palace in Nanjing was burned to the ground, along with the Jianwen Emperor, his wife, mother, and courtiers. Zhu Di assumed the throne as the Yongle Emperor (r. 1402–1424); his reign is universally viewed by scholars as a "second founding" of the Ming dynasty since he reversed many of his father's policies.

=== A new capital and a restored canal ===
The Yongle Emperor demoted Nanjing as a secondary capital and in 1403 announced the new capital of China was to be at his power base in Beijing. Construction of a new city there lasted from 1407 to 1420, employing hundreds of thousands of workers daily. At the center was the political node of the Imperial City, and at the center of this was the Forbidden City, the palatial residence of the emperor and his family. By 1553, the Outer City was added to the south, which brought the overall size of Beijing to 4 by 4½ miles.

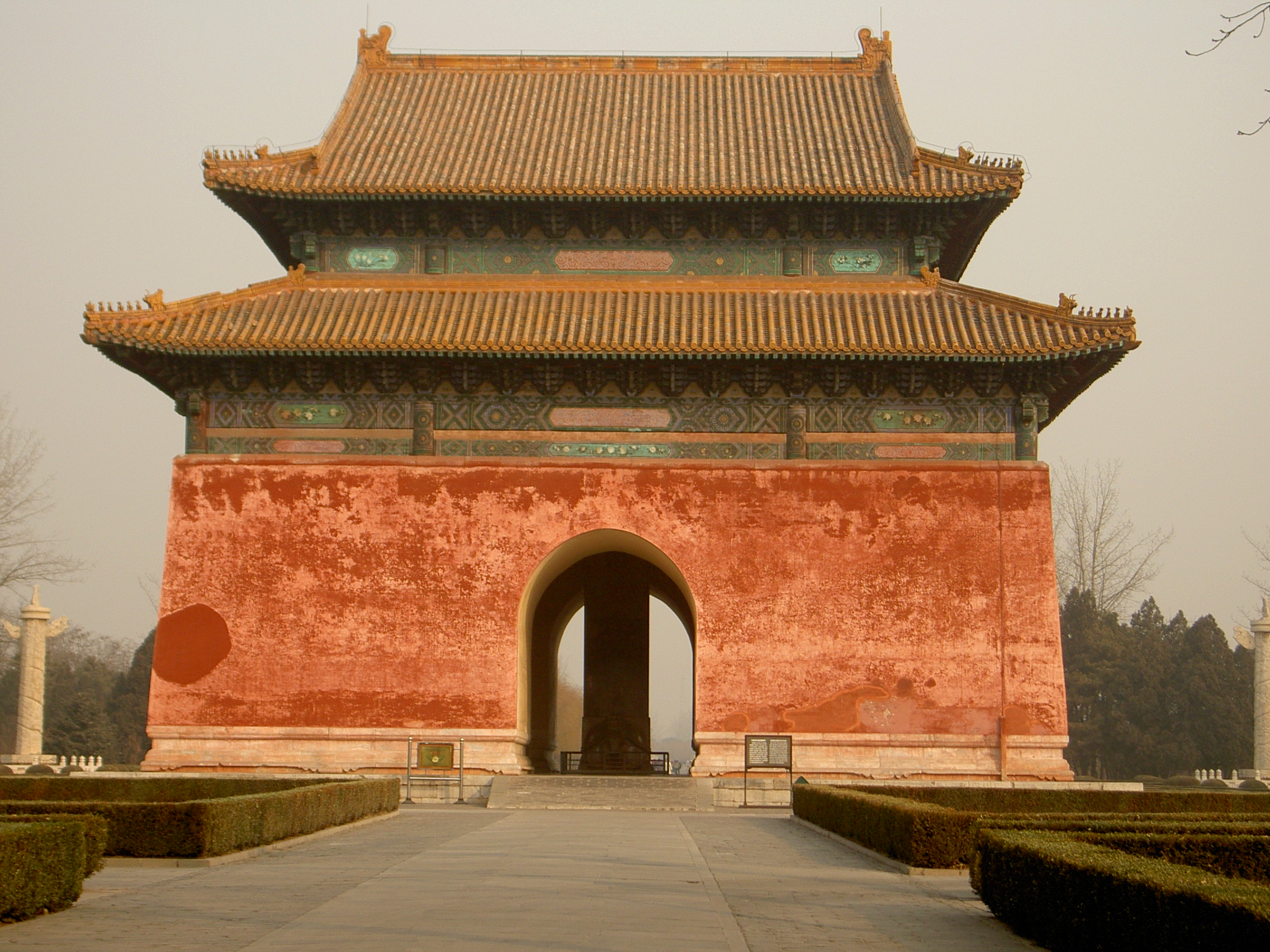
The Ming tombs located 50 km (31 mi) north of Beijing; the site was chosen by the Yongle Emperor.

After lying dormant and dilapidated for decades, the Grand Canal was restored under the Yongle Emperor's rule from 1411 to 1415. The impetus for restoring the canal was to solve the perennial problem of shipping grain north to Beijing. Shipping the annual 4,000,000 shi (one shi is equal to 107 liters) was made difficult with an inefficient system of shipping grain through the East China Sea or by several different inland canals that necessitated the transferring of grain onto several different barge types in the process, including shallow and deep-water barges. William Atwell quotes Ming dynasty sources that state the amount of collected tax grain was actually 30 million shi (93 million bushels), much larger than what Brook notes. The Yongle Emperor commissioned some 165,000 workers to dredge the canal bed in western Shandong and built a series of fifteen canal locks. The reopening of the Grand Canal had implications for Nanjing as well, as it was surpassed by the well-positioned city of Suzhou as the paramount commercial center of China. Despite greater efficiency, there were still factors which the government could not control that limited the transportation of taxed grain; for example, in 1420 a widespread crop failure and poor harvest dramatically reduced the tax grain delivered to the central government.

Although the Yongle Emperor ordered episodes of bloody purges like his father—including the execution of Fang Xiaoru, who refused to draft the proclamation of his succession—the Emperor had a different attitude about the scholar-officials. He had a selection of texts compiled from the Cheng-Zhu school of Confucianism—or Neo-Confucianism—in order to assist those who studied for the civil service examinations. The Yongle Emperor commissioned two thousand scholars to create a 50-million-word (22,938-chapter) long encyclopedia—the Yongle Encyclopedia—from seven thousand books. This surpassed all previous encyclopedias in scope and size, including the 11th-century compilation of the Four Great Books of Song. Yet the scholar-officials were not the only political group that the Yongle Emperor had to cooperate with and appease. Historian Michael Chang points out that the Yongle Emperor was an "emperor on horseback" who often traversed between two capitals like in the Mongol tradition and constantly led expeditions into Mongolia. This was opposed by the Confucian establishment while it served to bolster the importance of court eunuchs and military officers whose power depended upon the Emperor's favor.

=== The treasure fleet ===
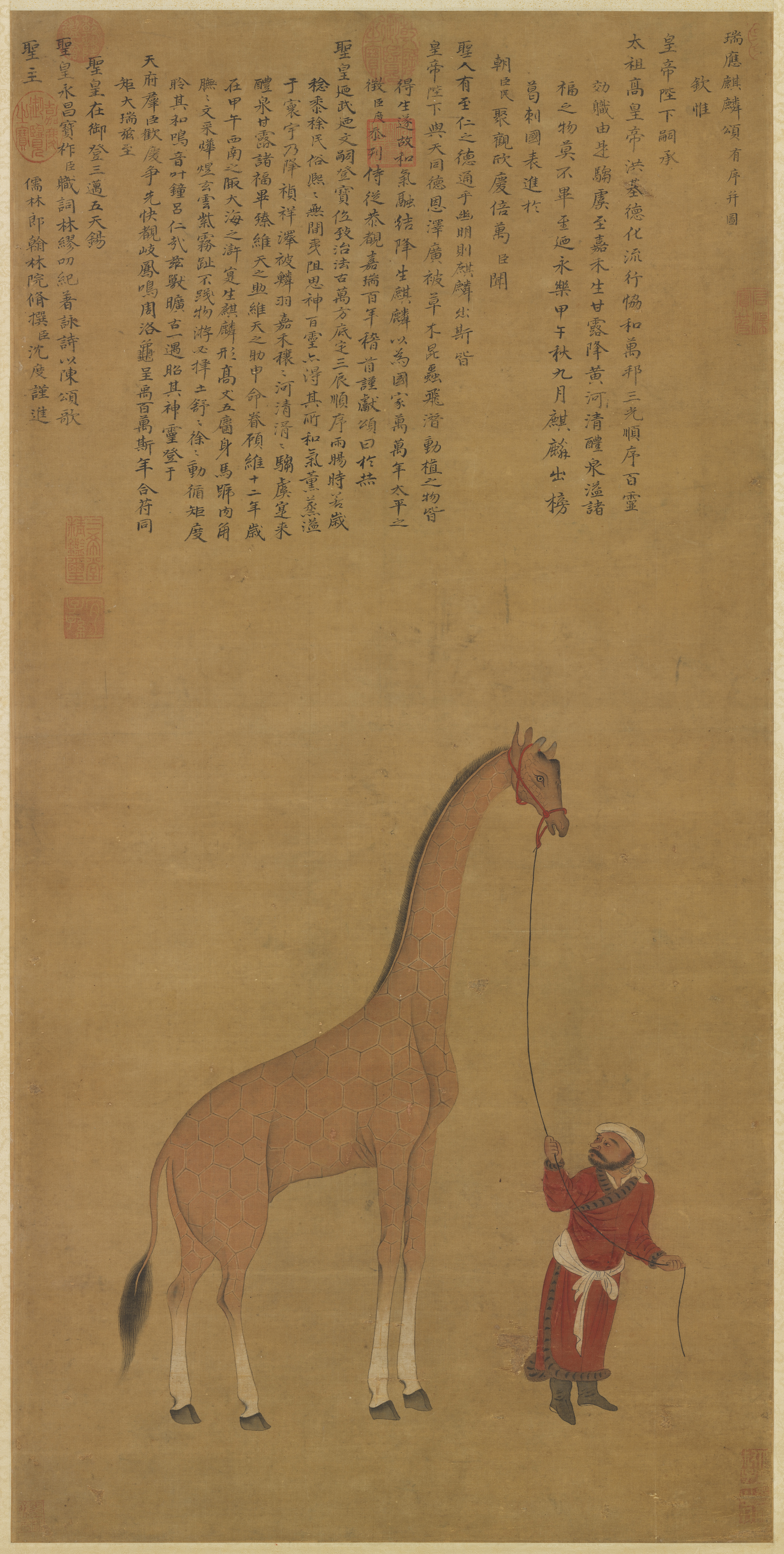
A giraffe brought from Africa in the twelfth year of Yongle (1414); the Chinese associated the giraffe with the mythical qilin.

Beginning in 1405, the Yongle Emperor entrusted his favored eunuch commander Zheng He (1371–1433) as the naval admiral for a gigantic new fleet of ships designated for international tributary missions. The Chinese had sent diplomatic missions over land and west since the Han dynasty (202 BC–220 AD) and had been engaged in private overseas trade leading all the way to East Africa for centuries—culminating in the Song and Yuan dynasties—but no government-sponsored tributary mission of this grandeur size had ever been assembled before. To service seven different tributary missions abroad, the Nanjing shipyards constructed two thousand vessels from 1403 to 1419, which included the large Chinese treasure ships that measured 112 m (370 ft) to 134 m (440 ft) in length and 45 m (150 ft) to 54 m (180 ft) in width. The first voyage from 1405 to 1407 contained 317 vessels with a staff of 70 eunuchs, 180 medical personnel, 5 astrologers, and 300 military officers commanding a total estimated force of 26,800 men.

The enormous tributary missions were discontinued after the death of Zheng He, yet his death was only one of many culminating factors which brought the missions to an end. The Ming Empire had conquered and annexed Đại Việt (present-day northern Vietnam) in 1407, but Ming troops were pushed out in 1428 with significant costs to the Ming treasury; in 1431 the new Lê dynasty of Đại Việt was recognized as an independent tribute state. There was also the threat and revival of Mongol power on the northern steppe which drew court attention away from other matters. The Yongle Emperor had staged enormous invasions deep into Mongol territory, competing with Korea for lands in Manchuria as well. To face the Mongol threat to the north, a massive amount of funds were used to build the Great Wall after 1474. The Yongle Emperor's moving of the capital from Nanjing to Beijing was largely in response to the court's need of keeping a closer eye on the Mongol threat in the north. Scholar-officials also associated the lavish expense of the fleets with eunuch power at court, and so halted funding for these ventures as a means to curtail further eunuch influence.

== Early rulers after Yongle ==
Portrait of the Xuande Emperor (r. 1425–1435)

After the Yongle Emperor's death in 1424, his son ascended to the throne as the Hongxi Emperor (r. 1424–1425). He put a stop to his father's expansionist policies, including expeditions against the Mongols, and also banned further tributary voyages by Zheng He. Following the Hongxi Emperor's reign, his son, the Xuande Emperor (r. 1425–1435), took over. In 1427, after a failed military expedition to suppress an uprising in Đại Việt, he made the decision to withdraw Chinese troops from the region. During his reign, Zheng He's seventh and final expedition took place. The Xuande Emperor's reign was relatively peaceful and prosperous, considered the peak of the Ming dynasty's glory.

In 1435, the Xuande Emperor's eldest son, Emperor Yingzong (r. 1435–1449), became emperor at the age of eight. This created significant procedural issues, as according to the rules established by the Hongwu Emperor, only the emperor could make decisions and no regency was allowed. Nominally, the government was operated under the control of the minor emperor, with his grandmother Grand Empress Dowager Zhang (d. 1442) acting as the informal regent. She was the widow of the Hongxi Emperor and the mother of the Xuande Emperor. However, the Emperor was greatly influenced by his tutor, teacher, and confidant, the eunuch Wang Zhen. In 1442, Emperor Yingzong took over as the sole ruler and his grandmother died soon after. This marked the beginning of Emperor Yingzong's personal rule and the first period of his reign, known as the Zhengtong era, is considered one of the most successful in the history of the Ming dynasty.

In the late 1420s, the government was facing financial pressure due to a high tax burden that had led to a decrease in tax revenues from wealthy regions. The war in Đại Việt had also drained significant resources, and the subsequent defeat resulted in a loss of revenue from mineral wealth. Furthermore, by the early 1430s, the profitability of many mines had declined. These financial issues were indicative of the beginning of an economic decline. Additionally, from the mid-1430s, a sixty-year cold period began in the Northern Hemisphere, causing repeated crop failures, famines, and epidemics, which were further exacerbated by occasional floods and droughts.

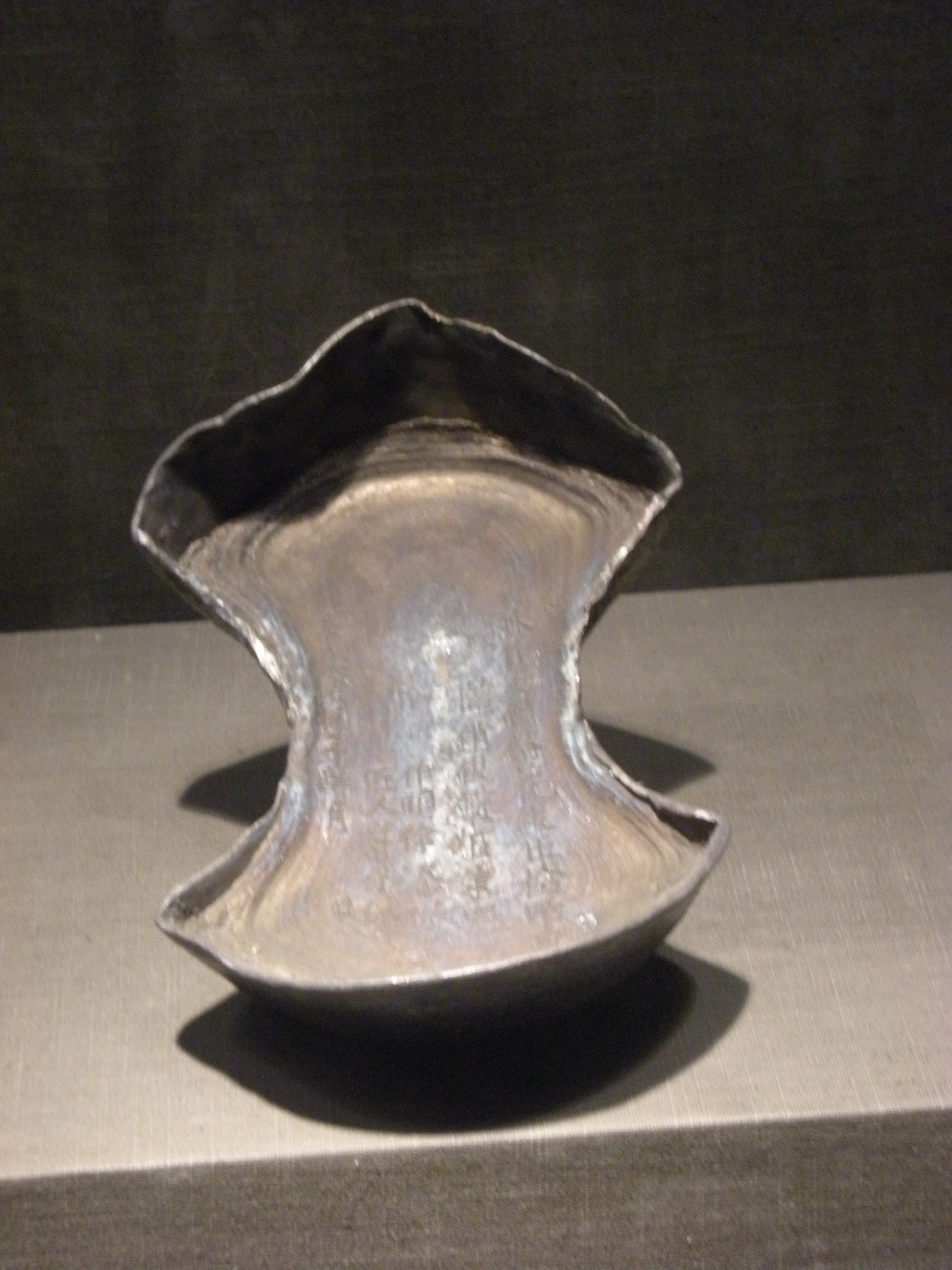
Early 15th-century silver ingot from the tomb of Prince Zhuang of Liang, Hubei Provincial Museum.

The economic problems were further exacerbated by the conflicts in the southwest during the 1430s and 1440s, leading to a decline in mining in the region rich in ores. The Confucian officials in power responded by implementing currency restrictions, such as closing silver mines and limiting the production of copper coins, as well as cutting state spending. This included cancelling overseas expeditions and limiting tributary exchanges. These austerity measures were easily adopted, especially since they affected the economic power of the eunuchs, who were competing groups in the power struggle. The eunuchs were heavily involved in naval expeditions and had a vested interest in silver mining. Meanwhile, the government also had to deal with unrest on the northern borders. The shortage of currency in China had far-reaching consequences, affecting not only Japan but also Java. Counterfeiting of coins and hoarding of precious metals became rampant, leading to severe restrictions on the circulation of silver by the 1440s.

In the early 1440s, when Wang Zhen rose to power at the imperial court, he advocated reopening silver mines under his control. However, due to low productivity and the excessive demands of the eunuchs overseeing the mines, numerous uprisings broke out among miners in Fujian, Zhejiang, and Jiangxi.

== Tumu Crisis and the Ming Mongols ==
=== Succession crisis ===
The Oirat leader Esen Taishi launched an invasion into the Ming dynasty in July 1449. Wang Zhen encouraged Emperor Yingzong to personally lead a force to face the Mongols after a recent Ming defeat; marching off with 50,000 troops, the Emperor left the capital and put his half-brother Zhu Qiyu in charge of affairs as temporary regent. In the battle that ensued, his force of 50,000 troops were decimated by Esen's army. On 3 September 1449, Emperor Yingzong was captured and held in captivity by the Mongols—an event known as the Tumu Crisis. After Emperor Yingzong's capture, Esen's forces plundered their way across the countryside and all the way to the suburbs of Beijing. Following this was another plundering of the Beijing suburbs in November of that year by local bandits and Ming dynasty soldiers of Mongol descent who dressed as invading Mongols. Many Han Chinese also took to brigandage soon after the Tumu incident.

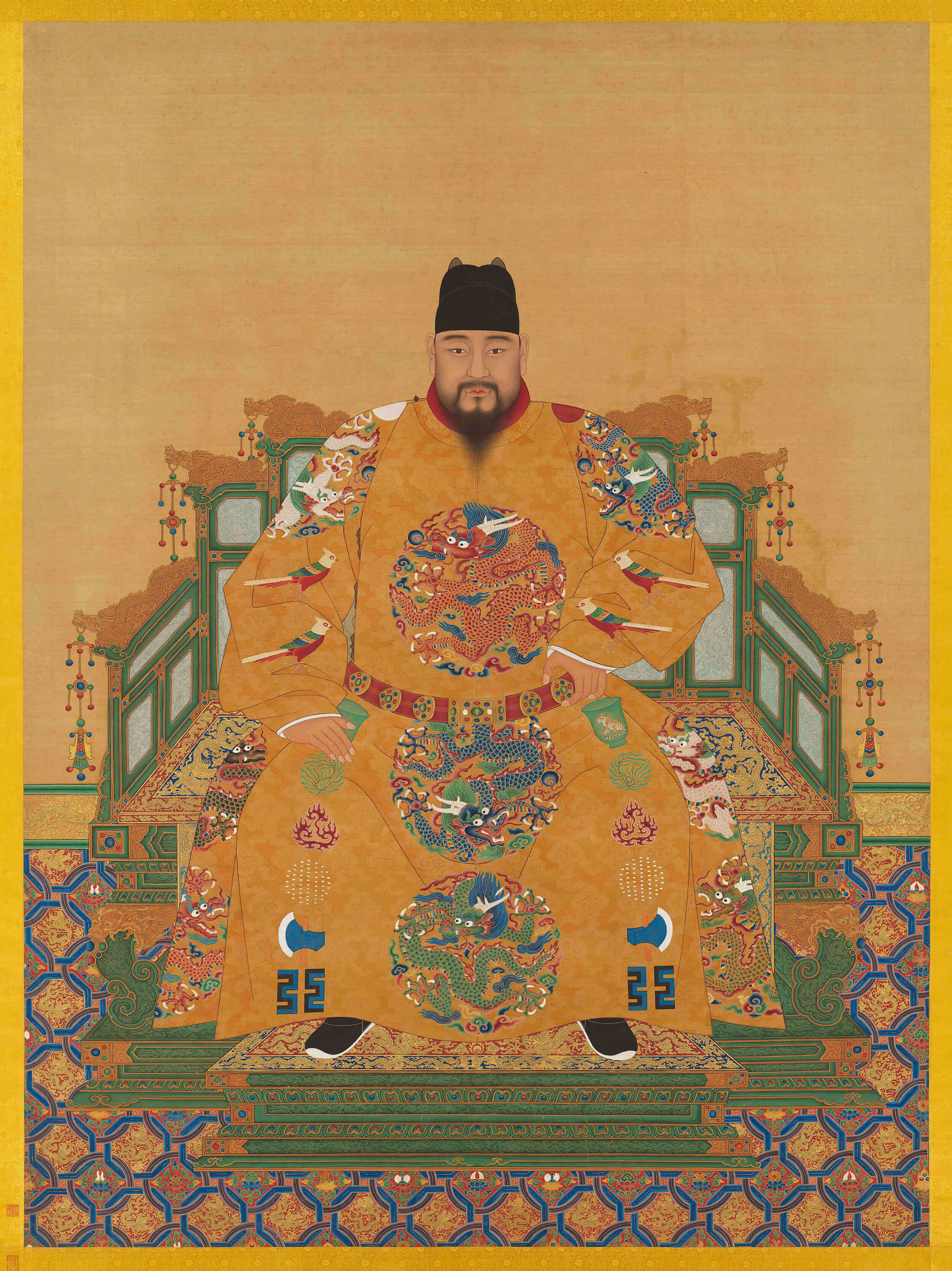
Emperor Yingzong of Ming; after deposing his half-brother, the Jingtai Emperor, in 1457, he ascended the throne again.

The Mongols held Emperor Yingzong for ransom. However, this scheme was foiled once the Emperor's younger brother assumed the throne as the Jingtai Emperor (r. 1449–1457); the Mongols were also repelled once the Jingtai Emperor's confidant and defense minister Yu Qian (1398–1457) gained control of the Ming armed forces. Holding Emperor Yingzong in captivity was a useless bargaining chip by the Mongols as long as another sat on his throne, so they released him back into the Ming dynasty. Emperor Yingzong was placed under house arrest in the palace until the coup against the Jingtai Emperor in 1457, which is known as the Duomen Coup ("Wresting the Gate Incident"). Emperor Yingzong retook the throne (r. 1457–1464).

=== Relocation, migration, and northern raids ===
The Mongol threat to China was at its greatest level in the 15th century, although periodic raiding continued throughout the dynasty. Like in the Tumu Crisis, the Mongol leader Altan Khan (r. 1542–1582) invaded the Ming dynasty and raided as far as the outskirts of Beijing. The Ming employed troops of Mongol descent to fight back Altan Khan's invasion, as well as Mongol military officers against Cao Qin's abortive coup of 1461. Mongol troops were also employed in the suppression of the Li people of Hainan in the early 16th century as well as the Liu Brothers and Tiger Yang in a 1510 rebellion. While the Yongle Emperor launched five major campaigns against the Mongols north of the Great Wall, continuing the Hongwu Emperor's policy of destroying the remnants of the Yuan dynasty, the persistent threat of Mongol invasion prompted the Ming government in the late 15th and early 16th centuries to renovate and strengthen the Great Wall. As John Fairbank notes that "it proved to be a futile military gesture but vividly expressed China's siege mentality." Yet the Great Wall was not meant to be a purely defensive fortification; its towers functioned rather as a series of lit beacons and signalling stations to allow rapid warning to friendly units of advancing enemy troops. In the early 16th century, the Ming army's combat effectiveness began to decline, making it unable to repel frequent nomadic raids. The Mongol incursions of 1532 and 1546 were particularly significant, and Chinese attempts to defeat them in the Ordos region were unsuccessful. In 1550, Mongol forces captured Datong and advanced towards Beijing's walls. To reclaim the occupied areas, a new army had to be raised and troops had to be redeployed from the southern regions of the country. It wasn't until the late 1560s that the Mongols were finally driven back, and a peace treaty was signed in 1570. However, smaller raids continued to occur.

Emperor Yingzong's second reign was a troubled one and Mongol forces within the Ming military structure continued to be problematic. Mongols serving the Ming military also became increasingly circumspect as the Ming began to heavily distrust their Mongol subjects after the Tumu Crisis. One method to ensure that Mongols could not band together in significant numbers in the north was a scheme of relocation and sending their troops on military missions to southern China. In January 1450, two thousand Mongol troops stationed in Nanjing were sent to Fujian in order to suppress a brigand army. The grand coordinator of Jiangxi, Yang Ning (1400–1458), suggested to the Jingtai Emperor that these Mongols be dispersed amongst the local battalions, a proposal that the Emperor agreed to (the exact number of Mongols resettled in this fashion is unknown). Despite this, Mongols continued to migrate to Beijing. A massive drought in August 1457 forced over five hundred Mongol families living on the steppe to seek refuge in Ming territories, entering through the Piantou Pass of northwestern Shanxi. According to the official report by the chief military officer of Piantou Pass, all of these Mongol families populated Beijing, where they were granted lodging and stipends. In July 1461, after Mongols had staged raids in June into Ming territory along the northern tracts of the Yellow River, Minister of War Ma Ang (1399–1476) and the general Sun Tang (died 1471) were appointed to lead a force of 15,000 troops to bolster the defenses of Shaanxi. Historian David M. Robinson states that "these developments must also have fed suspicion about Mongols living in North China, which in turn exacerbated Mongol feelings of insecurity. However, no direct link can be found between the decision by the Ming Mongols in Beijing to join the [1461] coup and activities of steppe Mongols in the northwest."

=== The failed coup of 1461 ===
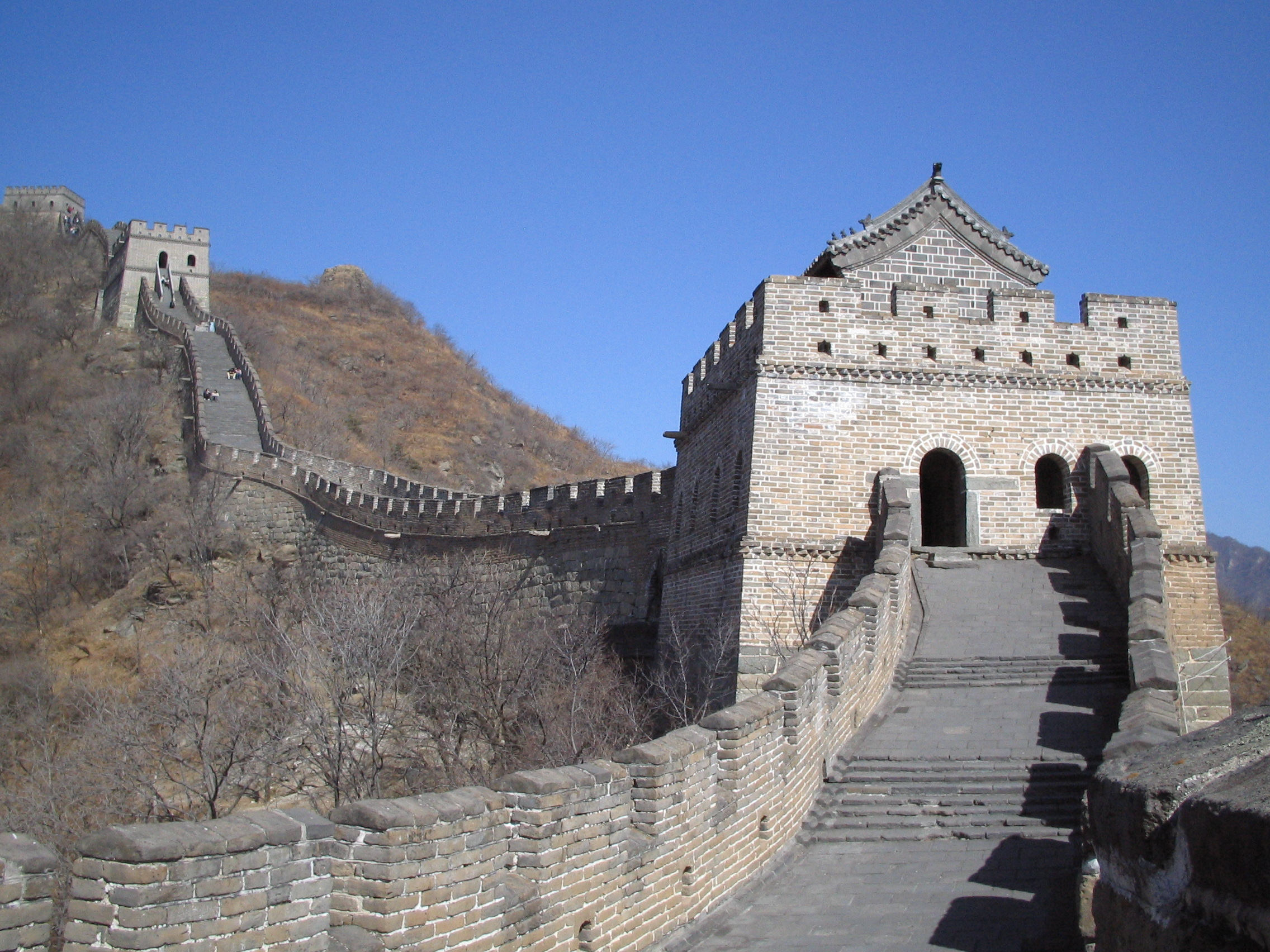
The Great Wall of China; although the rammed earth walls of the ancient Warring States were combined into a unified wall under the Qin and Han dynasties, the vast majority of the brick and stone Great Wall as it is seen today is a product of the Ming dynasty.

On 7 August 1461, the Chinese general Cao Qin (died 1461) and his Ming troops of Mongol descent staged a coup against Emperor Yingzong out of fear of being next on his purge-list of those who aided him in the Wresting the Gate Incident. On the previous day, the Emperor issued an edict telling his nobles and generals to be loyal to the throne; this was in effect a veiled threat to Cao Qin, after the latter had his associate in the Jinyiwei beaten to death to cover up crimes of illegal foreign transactions. Following the earlier downfall of Shi Heng—one of the Emperor's principal supporters in the 1457 restoration, who was eliminated in 1459 after a similar warning edict—Cao Qin chose not to risk suffering the same fate. The loyalty of Cao's Mongol-officer clients was secure due to circumstances of thousands of military officers who had to accept demotions in 1457 because of earlier promotions in aiding the Jingtai Emperor's succession. Robinson states that "Mongol officers no doubt expected that if Cao fell from power, they would soon follow." Cao either planned to kill Ma Ang and Sun Tang as they were to depart the capital with 15,000 troops to Shaanxi on the morning of 7 August, or he simply planned to take advantage of their leave. The conspirators are said to have planned to place their heir apparent on the throne and demote the Tianshun Emperor's position to "emperor emeritus", the title granted to him during the years of his house arrest.

After a failed plot to have Grand Secretary Li Xian send a memorial to the throne to pardon Cao Qin for killing Lu Gao, head of the Jinyiwei who had been investigating him, Cao Qin began the assault on Dongan Gate, East Chang'an Gate, and West Chang'an Gate, setting fire to the western and eastern gates; these fires were extinguished later in the day by pouring rain. Ming troops poured into the area outside the Imperial City to counterattack. By midday, Sun Tang's forces had killed two of Cao Qin's brothers and severely wounded Cao in both his arms; his forces took up position in the Great Eastern Market and Lantern Market northeast of Dongan Gate, while Sun deployed artillery units against the rebels. Cao lost his third brother, Cao Duo, while attempting to flee out of Beijing by the Chaoyang Gate. Cao fled with his remaining forces to fortify his residential compound in Beijing; Ming troops stormed the residence and Cao Qin committed suicide by throwing himself down a well. As promised by Li Xian before they stormed the residence, imperial troops were allowed to confiscate the property of Cao Qin for themselves.

== Reigns of the late 15th and 16th centuries ==
Portrait of the Chenghua Emperor (r. 1464–1487)

In February 1464, Emperor Yingzong's 16-year-old son, the Chenghua Emperor (r. 1464–1487), ascended the throne. During the first half of his reign, he heavily relied on officials from the Grand Secretariat. However, throughout his entire reign, he remained under the influence of his concubine, Lady Wan. She used her power to promote eunuchs and her own family, leading to widespread corruption. In the later years of his reign, the eunuchs Wang Zhi and Liang Fang gained control of the government. Peasant uprisings erupted throughout the country, but were brutally suppressed. During his reign, construction on the Great Wall began. On 1 September 1487, the Emperor fell ill and on 4 September, he appointed his son to preside over government meetings. He died on 9 September.

In 1487, the Hongzhi Emperor (r. 1487–1505), the son of the Chenghua Emperor, took over the throne. He ruled with a strong adherence to Confucian ideology and was known for his diligence and hard work. He closely oversaw state affairs, implemented tax reductions and cut unnecessary government spending, and appointed capable officials to government positions. Unlike many rulers in the second half of the dynasty, the Hongzhi Emperor worked harmoniously with his grand secretaries and ministers. He also limited the power of the eunuchs and the influence of palace intrigues on the government. Official Chinese historiography praises him as one of the five most successful rulers of the Ming dynasty, alongside the Hongwu, Yongle, Hongxi, and Xuande emperors. However, his successor, the Zhengde Emperor (r. 1505–1521), neglected state affairs and focused on entertainment. This allowed eunuch Liu Jin and later the Emperor's favorites, Qian Ning and Jiang Bin, to hold the actual power. While Qian Ning had knowledge of the empire's administration, the actions of Jiang Bin caused chaos in the state. The Zhengde Emperor's extravagant spending also worsened the empire's financial problems. During his reign, the Mongol invasions led by Dayan Khan (r. 1480–1517) intensified. In 1517, Ming troops under the Emperor's command were able to defeat the Mongolian forces, marking the only victory of the Ming forces over the main Mongolian forces in the 16th century. The Zhengde Emperor died without an heir in 1521. Traditional Chinese historiography and subsequent Western historians have generally viewed his reign negatively.

Portrait of the Jiajing Emperor (r. 1521–1567)

Grand Secretary Yang Tinghe, who headed the government at the time when the Zhengde Emperor died, successfully advocated for his cousin Zhu Houcong to succeed to the throne. Zhu Houcong took the reign title "Jiajing", and his reign lasted from 1521 to 1567. Yang Tinghe worked to limit the power of the eunuchs, reclaim properties that had been distributed by the previous emperor, and remove thousands of his supporters. However, in March 1524, the Emperor forced Yang Tinghe to resign from his position. Later that same year, in June, the Emperor ordered the arrest and flogging of over 200 scholar-officials who had objected to his demand for imperial worship for his deceased father, who had not been an emperor. This brutal punishment resulted in the death of 17 officials, while the others who survived were dismissed and exiled. In 1528, the 69-year-old Yang Tinghe was sentenced to death, but the Jiajing Emperor commuted the sentence to degradation. From that point on, the Emperor ruled with absolute power, and officials were able to maintain their positions as long as they unquestioningly fulfilled his every desire. He quickly became one of the most unpopular emperors of the dynasty. Many of his failures as a ruler can be attributed to his strong belief in magic and Taoism. By the 1530s, he had begun to distance himself from the daily affairs of the state, instead focusing on finding ways to prolong his life and enhance his sexual prowess. For example, he believed that having intercourse with a fourteen-year-old virgin would contribute to this goal, and thus he ordered nearly a thousand young girls to be brought to the palace. At the beginning of his son's reign, the Longqing Emperor (r. 1567–1572), reforms were implemented in order to strengthen the state, including measures to combat corruption, limit the power of eunuchs, and lift the ban on foreign trade. Despite a promising start, the Emperor eventually neglected his governmental duties and indulged in lavish palace entertainments.

== Isolation to globalization ==
Ming rulers faced the challenge of balancing trade with Central Asia and military threats on the northern frontiers against the dangers and profits associated with maritime powers. These issues were simultaneously cultural, political, and economic. The historian Arthur Waldron argues that early Ming rulers confronted a fundamental question: was the Ming to be essentially a Chinese version of the Yuan, or was it to be something new? The Tang dynasty provided a historical model of cosmopolitan and culturally flexible rule, while the Song dynasty, which never controlled key regions of Central Asia, offered an example of a polity that was more narrowly Han Chinese in orientation. The Ming dynasty was ultimately shaped by its successes and frustrations in managing these two external spheres of interaction.

=== Universal rulership ===
The early Ming emperors, from the Hongwu Emperor to the Zhengde Emperor, continued several practices inherited from the Yuan dynasty. These included hereditary military institutions; the demand for Korean and Muslim concubines and eunuchs; the employment of Mongols in the Ming military; and the patronage of Tibetan Buddhism. Early Ming rulers also sought to portray themselves as "universal rulers" in their dealings with diverse groups, including Central Asian Muslims, Tibetans, and Mongols. The Yongle Emperor cited the Emperor Taizong of Tang as a model ruler who was familiar with both Chinese society and the steppe peoples. The Ming court also claimed the legacy of the Mongol khans as patrons of both Eastern and Western religions and as rulers of both agrarian regions and the steppe. This claim was expressed through policies such as the patronage of Islam and the use of Chinese, Persian, and Mongol languages in imperial edicts addressing Islamic communities, practices previously employed by the Yuan dynasty to assert legitimacy. Influenced by the methodologies of New Qing History, a body of scholarship sometimes referred to as "New Ming History" has emerged. This approach similarly emphasizes the Inner Asian dimensions of the Ming dynasty and challenges earlier interpretations that portrayed the Ming as solely a restoration of Han Chinese rule.

=== Illegal trade, piracy, and war with Japan ===
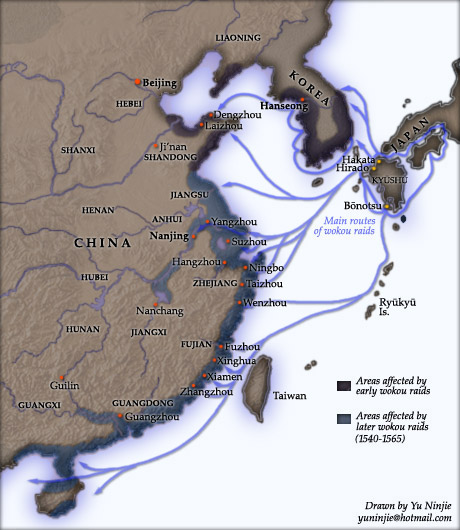
16th century Japanese pirate raids.

In 1479, the vice president of the Ministry of War burned the court records documenting Zheng He's voyages; it was one of many events signalling China's shift to an inward foreign policy. Shipbuilding laws were implemented that restricted vessels to a small size; the concurrent decline of the Ming navy allowed the growth of piracy along China's coasts. Japanese pirates—or wokou—began staging raids on Chinese ships and coastal communities, although much of the acts of piracy were carried out by native Chinese.

Instead of mounting a counterattack, Ming authorities chose to shut down coastal facilities and starve the pirates out; all foreign trade was to be conducted by the state under the guise of formal tribute missions. These were known as the hai jin laws, a strict ban on private maritime activity until its formal abolishment in 1567. In this period government-managed overseas trade with Japan was carried out exclusively at the seaport of Ningbo, trade with the Philippines exclusively at Fuzhou, and trade with Indonesia exclusively at Guangzhou. Even then the Japanese were only allowed into port once every ten years and were allowed to bring a maximum of three hundred men on two ships; these laws encouraged many Chinese merchants to engage in widespread illegal trade and smuggling.

The low point in relations between Ming China and Japan occurred during the rule of the great Japanese warlord Hideyoshi, who in 1592 announced he was going to conquer China. In two campaigns (now known collectively as the Imjin War) the Japanese fought with the Korean and Ming armies. Though initially successful, the Japanese forces were pushed back southward after the intervention of Ming China. With the combined strength of Ming and Korean forces on land, and the naval prowess of Korean admiral Yi Sun-sin at sea, the campaign ended in defeat for the Japanese and their armies were forced to withdraw from the Korean peninsula. However, the victory came at relatively large cost to the Ming government's treasury: some 26,000,000 ounces of silver.

=== Trade and contact with Europe ===
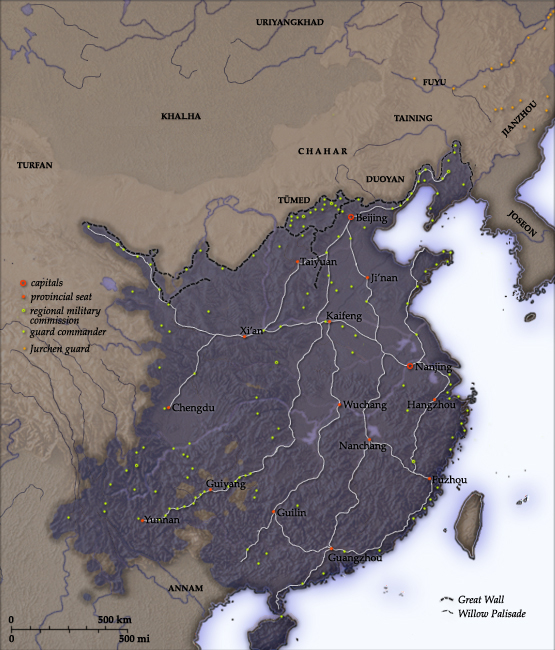
Military command centers in 1580, concentrated mostly along the seacoast, the northern border, and the southwest; major courier routes shown are based on a map from Timothy Brook's The Confusions of Pleasure.

Although Jorge Álvares was the first to land on Lintin Island in the Pearl River Delta in May 1513, it was Rafael Perestrello—a cousin of the famed Christopher Columbus—who became the first known European explorer to land on the southern coast of mainland China and trade in Guangzhou in 1516, commanding a Portuguese vessel with a crew from a Malaysian junk that had sailed from Malacca. The Portuguese sent a large subsequent expedition in 1517 to enter port at Guangzhou to trade with the Chinese merchants there. During this expedition the Portuguese attempted to send an inland delegation in the name of Manuel I of Portugal to the court of the Zhengde Emperor. Although Fernão Pires de Andrade was able to meet the Zhengde Emperor while the latter was touring Nanjing in May 1520, Pires de Andrade's mission waited in Beijing to meet the Zhengde Emperor once more, but the Emperor died in 1521. Grand Secretary Yang Tinghe rejected eunuch influence at court and rejected this new foreign embassy by the Portuguese once Malaccan ambassadors arrived in China damning the Portuguese for deposing their king; the Portuguese diplomatic mission languished in a Chinese prison where they died. Simão de Andrade, brother to ambassador Fernão Pires de Andrade, had also stirred Chinese speculation that the Portuguese were kidnapping Chinese children to cook and eat them; Simão had purchased children as slaves who were later found by Portuguese authorities in Diu, India. In 1521, Ming dynasty naval forces fought and repulsed Portuguese ships at Tuen Mun, where some of the first breech-loading culverins were introduced to China, and again fought off the Portuguese in 1522.

Despite initial hostilities, by 1549 the Portuguese were sending annual trade missions to Shangchuan Island. In the early 1550s, Leonel de Sousa—a later captain-major of Macau—reestablished a positive image of Portuguese in the eyes of the Chinese and reopened relations with Ming officials. The Portuguese friar Gaspar da Cruz (c. 1520 – 5 February 1570) traveled to Guangzhou in 1556 and wrote the first book on China and the Ming dynasty that was published in Europe (fifteen days after his death); it included information on its geography, provinces, royalty, official class, bureaucracy, shipping, architecture, farming, craftsmanship, merchant affairs, clothing, religious and social customs, music and instruments, writing, education, and justice. In 1557 the Portuguese managed to convince the Ming court to agree on a legal port treaty that would establish Macau as a Portuguese trade colony on the coasts of the South China Sea. The Chinese found the Portuguese settlement useful in expelling hostile Japanese sailors, as well as a useful tool to control other aggressive European powers since the Portuguese repelled the Dutch from Macau in 1601, 1607, and 1622. The Dutch had even blockaded Zhangzhou's Yuegang in 1623 in order to force local authorities there to allow them to trade, while local Chinese merchants sent urgent petitions to the provincial governor pleading for him to allow the Dutch entry into port. China defeated the Dutch in the Sino–Dutch conflicts in 1622–1624 over the Penghu islands and again defeated the Dutch at the Battle of Liaoluo Bay in 1633. Chinese trade relations with the Dutch began to improve after 1637 and in 1639 the Japanese cut off trade with the Portuguese due to the Shimabara Rebellion, thus impoverishing Macau and leading to its decline as a major port.

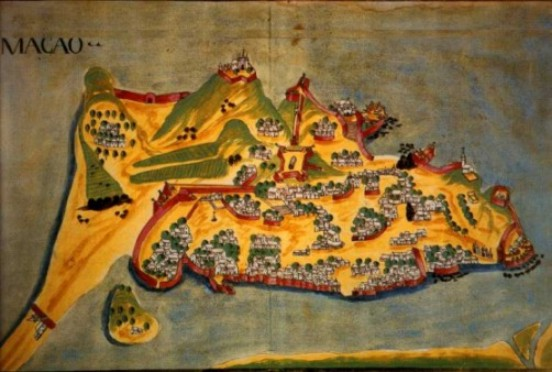
Map of Macau Peninsula in 1639, long after the first Portuguese settlement there and in the same year that the city began to decline due to halt of trade shipments from Japan.

From China the major exports were silk and porcelain. The Dutch East India Company alone handled the trade of 6 million porcelain items from China to Europe between the years 1602 to 1682. After noting the variety of silk goods traded to Europeans, Ebrey writes of the considerable size of commercial transactions:

In one case a galleon to the Spanish territories in the New World carried over 50,000 pairs of silk stockings. In return China imported mostly silver from Peruvian and Mexican mines, transported via Manila. Chinese merchants were active in these trading ventures, and many emigrated to such places as the Philippines and Borneo to take advantage of the new commercial opportunities.

After the Chinese had banned direct trade by Chinese merchants with Japan, the Portuguese filled this commercial vacuum as intermediaries between China and Japan. The Portuguese bought Chinese silk and sold it to the Japanese in return for Japanese-mined silver; since silver was more highly valued in China, the Portuguese could then use Japanese silver to buy even larger stocks of Chinese silk. However, by 1573—after the Spanish established a trading base in Manila—the Portuguese intermediary trade was trumped by the prime source of incoming silver to China from the Spanish Americas. Although it is unknown just how much silver flowed from the Philippines to China, it is known that the main port for the Mexican silver trade—Acapulco—shipped between 150,000 and 345,000 kg (4 to 9 million taels) of silver annually from 1597 to 1602.

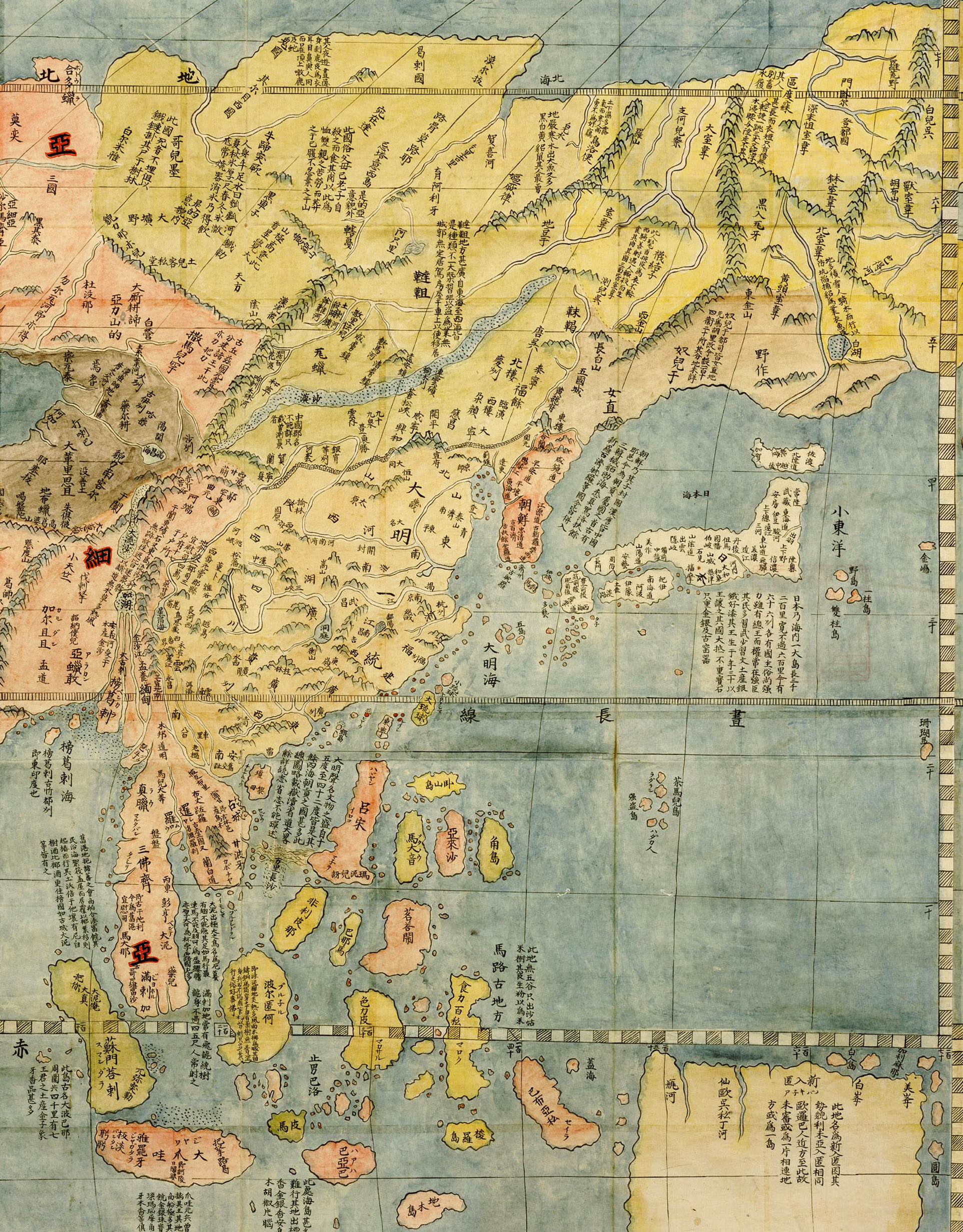
Map of East Asia by the Italian Jesuit Matteo Ricci in 1602; Ricci (1552–1610) was the first European allowed into the Forbidden City, taught the Chinese how to construct and play the spinet, translated Chinese texts into Latin and vice versa, and worked closely with his Chinese associate Xu Guangqi (1562–1633) on mathematical work.

Although the bulk of imports to China were silver, the Chinese also purchased New World crops from the Spanish Empire. This included sweet potatoes, maize, and peanuts, foods that could be cultivated in lands where traditional Chinese staple crops—wheat, millet, and rice—couldn't grow, hence facilitating a rise in the population of China. In the Song dynasty (960–1279), rice had become the major staple crop of the poor; after sweet potatoes were introduced to China around 1560, it gradually became the traditional food of the lower classes.

The beginning of relations between the Spanish and Chinese were much warmer than when the Portuguese were first given a reception in China. In the Philippines, the Spanish defeated the fleet of the infamous Chinese pirate Limahong in 1575, an act greatly appreciated by the Ming admiral who had been sent to capture Limahong. In fact, the Chinese admiral invited the Spanish to board his vessel and travel back to China, a trip which included two Spanish soldiers and two Christian friars eager to spread the faith. However, the friars returned to the Philippines after it became apparent that their preaching was unwelcome; Matteo Ricci would fare better in his trip of 1582. The Augustinian monk Juan Gonzáles de Mendoza wrote an influential work on China in 1585, remarking that the Ming dynasty was the best-governed kingdom he was aware of in the known world.

Displaying a multitude of items exported from China to the Spanish base at Manila, Brook quotes Antonio de Morga (1559–1636), president of the Real Audiencia de Manila, who precariously mentions porcelain only once, even though at this time it is becoming one of the greatest export items to Europe from China. From his observation of textiles in the Manila inventory, the Spanish were buying:

...raw silk in bundles...fine untwisted silk, white and of all colors...quantities of velvets, some plain and some embroidered in all sorts of figures, colors, and fashions, with body of gold and embroidered with gold; woven stuff and brocades, of gold and silver upon silk of various colors and patterns...damasks, satins, taffetas...

Other goods that Antonio de Morga mentioned included were:

...musk, benzoin and ivory; many bed ornaments, hangings, coverlets and tapestries of embroidered velvet...tablecloths, cushions, and carpets; horse-trappings of the same stuffs, and embroidered with glass beads and seed-pearls; also pearls and rubies, sapphires and crystals; metal basins, copper kettles and other copper and cast-iron pots. . .wheat flour, preserves made of orange, peach, pair, nutmeg and ginger, and other fruits of China; salt pork and other salt meats; live fowl of good breed and many fine capons...chestnuts, walnuts...little boxes and writing cases; beds, tables, chairs, and gilded benches, painted in many figures and patterns. They bring domestic buffaloes; geese that resemble swans; horses, some mules and asses; even caged birds, some of which talk, while others sing, and they make them play innumerable tricks...pepper and other spices.

== Decline ==
=== Reign of the Wanli Emperor ===
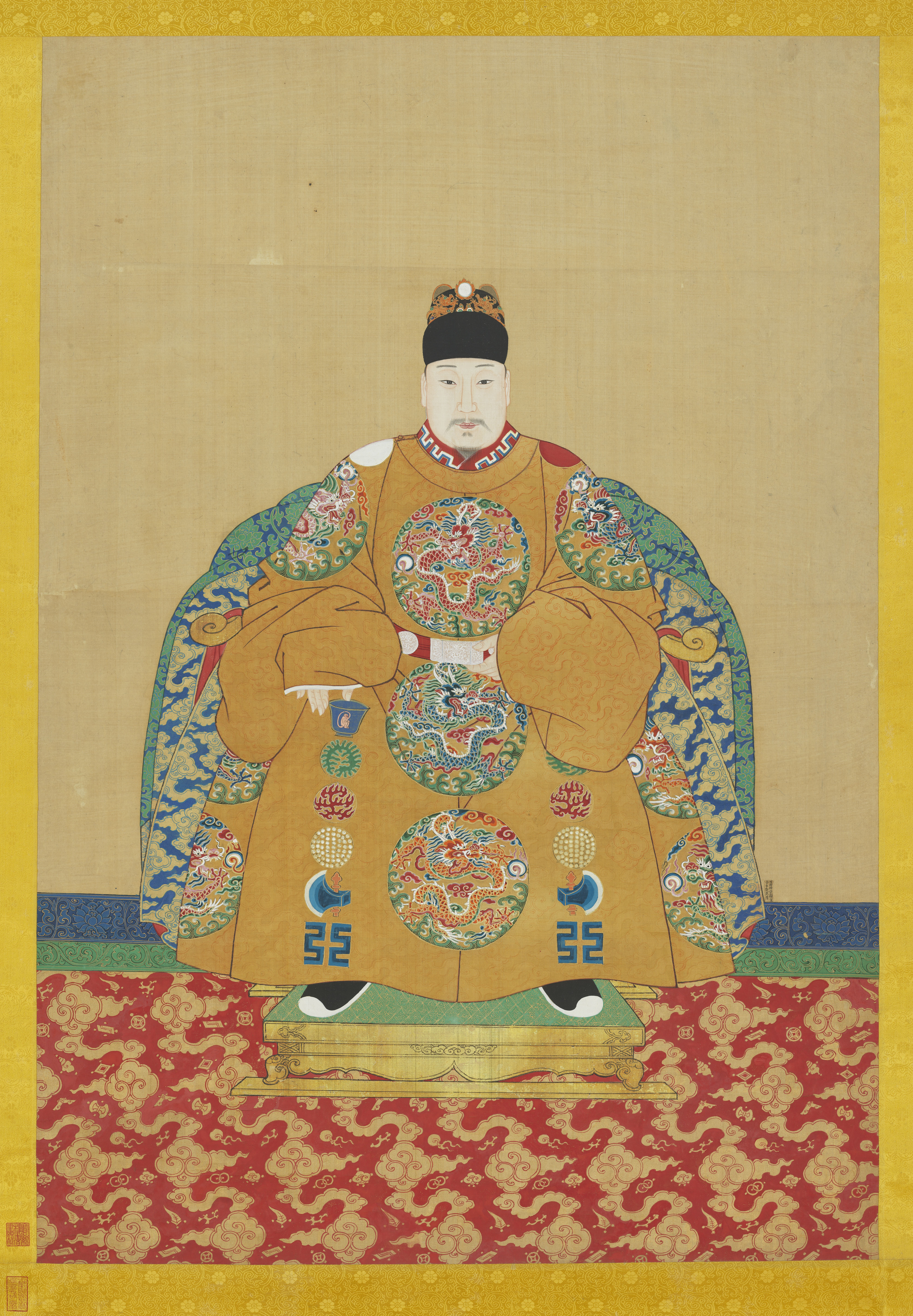
Portrait of the Wanli Emperor (r. 1572–1620)

The financial drain of the Imjin War in Korea against the Japanese was one of the many problems—fiscal or other—facing Ming China during the reign of the Wanli Emperor. In the beginning of his reign, the Emperor surrounded himself with able advisors and made a conscientious effort to handle state affairs. His Grand Secretary Zhang Juzheng (in office from 1572 to 1582) built up an effective network of alliances with senior officials. However, there was no one after him skilled enough to maintain the stability of these alliances; officials soon banded together in opposing political factions. Over time, the Wanli Emperor grew tired of court affairs and frequent political quarreling amongst his ministers, preferring to stay behind the walls of the Forbidden City and out of his officials' sight.

Officials aggravated the Wanli Emperor about which of his sons should succeed to the throne; he also grew equally disgusted with senior advisors constantly bickering about how to manage the state. There were rising factions at court and across the intellectual sphere of China stemming from the philosophical debate for or against the teaching of Wang Yangming, the latter of whom rejected some of the orthodox views of Neo-Confucianism. Annoyed by all of this, the Wanli Emperor began neglecting his duties, remaining absent from court audiences to discuss politics, lost interest in studying the Confucian Classics, refused to read petitions and other state papers, and stopped filling the recurrent vacancies of vital upper level administrative posts. Scholar-officials lost prominence in administration as eunuchs became intermediaries between the aloof emperor and his officials; any senior official who wanted to discuss state matters had to persuade powerful eunuchs with a bribe simply to have his demands or message relayed to the emperor.

=== The role of eunuchs ===
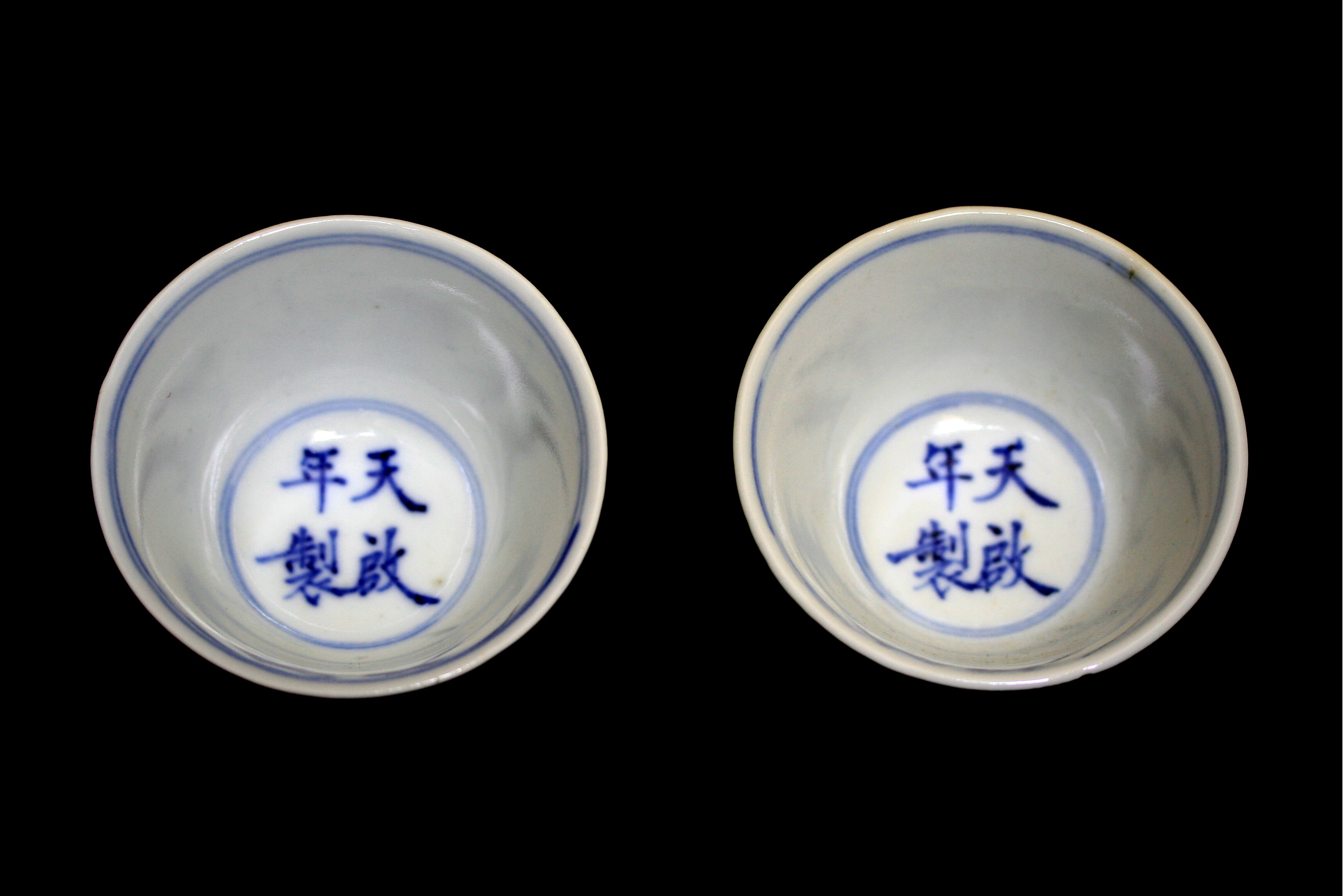
Tianqi era teacups, from the Nantoyōsō Collection in Japan; the Tianqi Emperor was heavily influenced and largely controlled by the eunuch Wei Zhongxian (1568–1627).

The Hongwu Emperor forbade eunuchs to learn how to read or engage in politics. Whether or not these restrictions were carried out with absolute success in his reign, eunuchs in the Yongle era and after managed huge imperial workshops, commanded armies, and participated in matters of appointment and promotion of officials. The eunuchs developed their own bureaucracy that was organized parallel to but was not subject to the civil service bureaucracy. Not all eunuchs worked inside the palace; Zheng He and Yishiha were admirals. Although there were several dictatorial eunuchs throughout the Ming, such as Wang Zhen, Wang Zhi, and Liu Jin, excessive tyrannical eunuch power did not become evident until the 1590s when the Wanli Emperor increased their rights over the civil bureaucracy and granted them power to collect provincial taxes. Complaints about eunuchs abusing their powers of taxation, as well as tales of sexual predations and occult practices, surface in popular culture works such as Zhang Yingyu's "The Book of Swindles" (ca. 1617).

The eunuch Wei Zhongxian (1568–1627) dominated the court of the Tianqi Emperor (r. 1620–1627) and had his political rivals tortured to death, mostly the vocal critics from the faction of the "Donglin Society". He ordered temples built in his honor throughout the Ming Empire, and built personal palaces created with funds allocated for building the previous emperor's tombs. His friends and family gained important positions without qualifications. Wei also published a historical work lambasting and belittling his political opponents. Constant changes at court became the norm, and there was also an intensification of natural disasters, epidemics, rebellions, and foreign invasions. Although the Chongzhen Emperor (r. 1627–1644) dismissed Wei, who later committed suicide, problems involving palace eunuchs persisted until the fall of the dynasty, which occurred less than twenty years later.

=== Economic breakdown ===
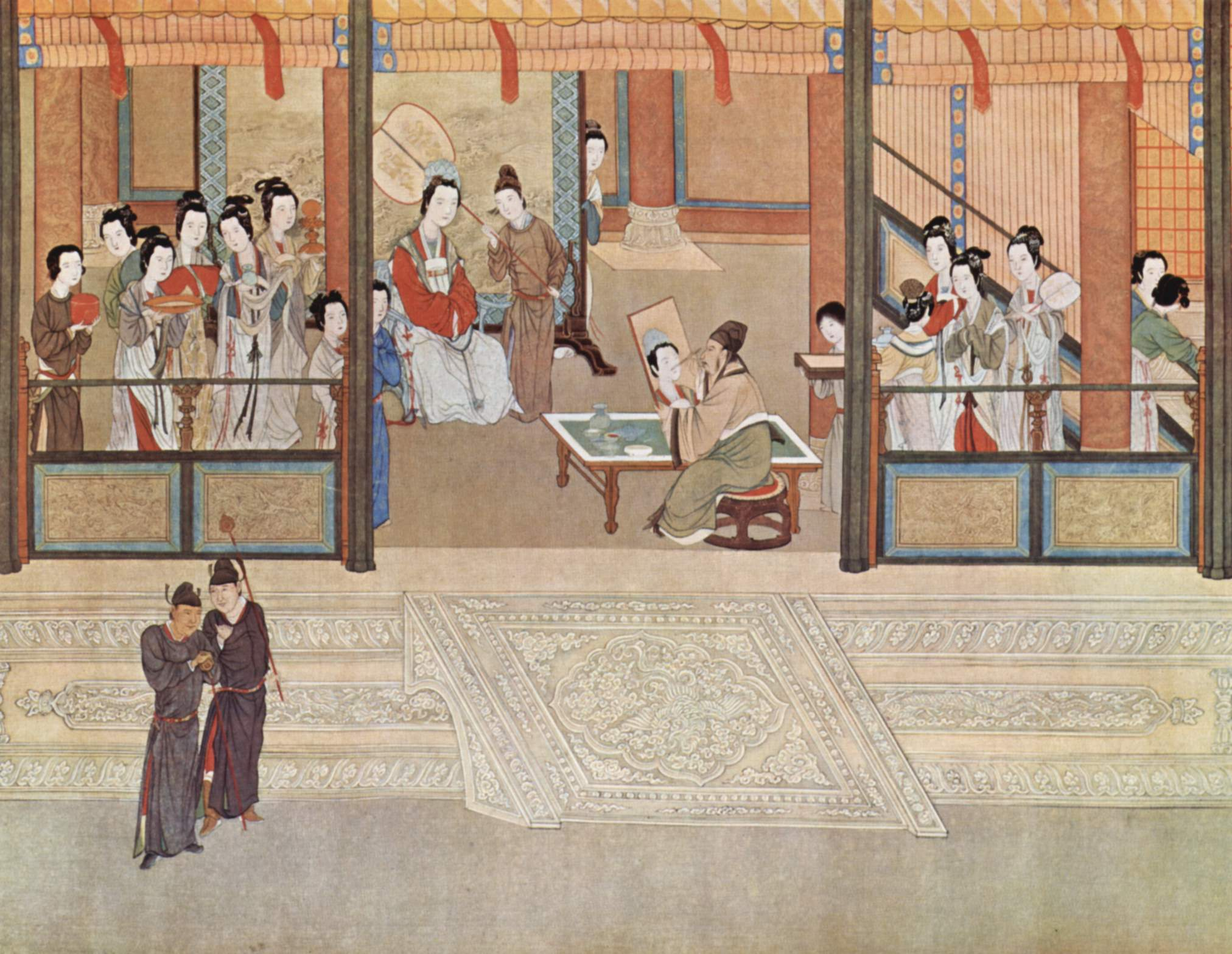
Spring morning in a Han palace, by Qiu Ying (1494–1552); excessive luxury and decadence were hallmarks of the late Ming period, spurred by the enormous state bullion of incoming silver and private transactions involving silver.

During the last years of the Wanli Emperor's reign and those of his two successors, an economic crisis developed that was centered around a sudden widespread lack of the empire's chief medium of exchange: silver. The Protestant powers of the Dutch Republic and the Kingdom of England staged frequent raids and acts of piracy against the Catholic-based empires of Spain and Portugal in order to weaken their global economic power. Meanwhile, Philip IV of Spain (r. 1621–1665) began cracking down on illegal smuggling of silver from Mexico and Peru across the Pacific towards China, in favor of shipping American-mined silver directly from Spain to Manila. In 1639, the new Tokugawa regime of Japan shut down most of its foreign trade with European powers, causing a halt of yet another source of silver coming into China. However, the greatest stunt to the flow of silver came from the Americas, while Japanese silver still came into China in limited amounts. Some scholars even assert that the price of silver rose in the 17th century due to a falling demand for goods, not declining silver stocks.

These events occurring at roughly the same time caused a dramatic spike in the value of silver and made paying taxes nearly impossible for most provinces. People began hoarding precious silver as there was progressively less of it, forcing the ratio of the value of copper to silver into a steep decline. In the 1630s, a string of one thousand copper coins was worth an ounce of silver; by 1640 this was reduced to the value of half an ounce; by 1643 it was worth roughly one-third of an ounce. For peasants this was an economic disaster, since they paid taxes in silver while conducting local trade and selling their crops with copper coins.

=== Natural disasters ===
In this early half of the 17th century, famines became common in northern China because of unusual dry and cold weather that shortened the growing season; these were effects of a larger ecological event now known as the Little Ice Age. Famine, alongside tax increases, widespread military desertions, a declining relief system, and natural disasters such as flooding and inability of the government to properly manage irrigation and flood-control projects caused widespread loss of life and normal civility. The central government was starved of resources and could do very little to mitigate the effects of these calamities. Making matters worse, a widespread epidemic spread across China from Zhejiang to Henan, killing a large but unknown number of people. The famine and drought in late 1620s and 1630s contributed to the rebellions that broke out in Shaanxi led by rebel leader such as Li Zicheng and Zhang Xianzhong.

== Fall of the dynasty ==
=== Rise of the Manchus ===
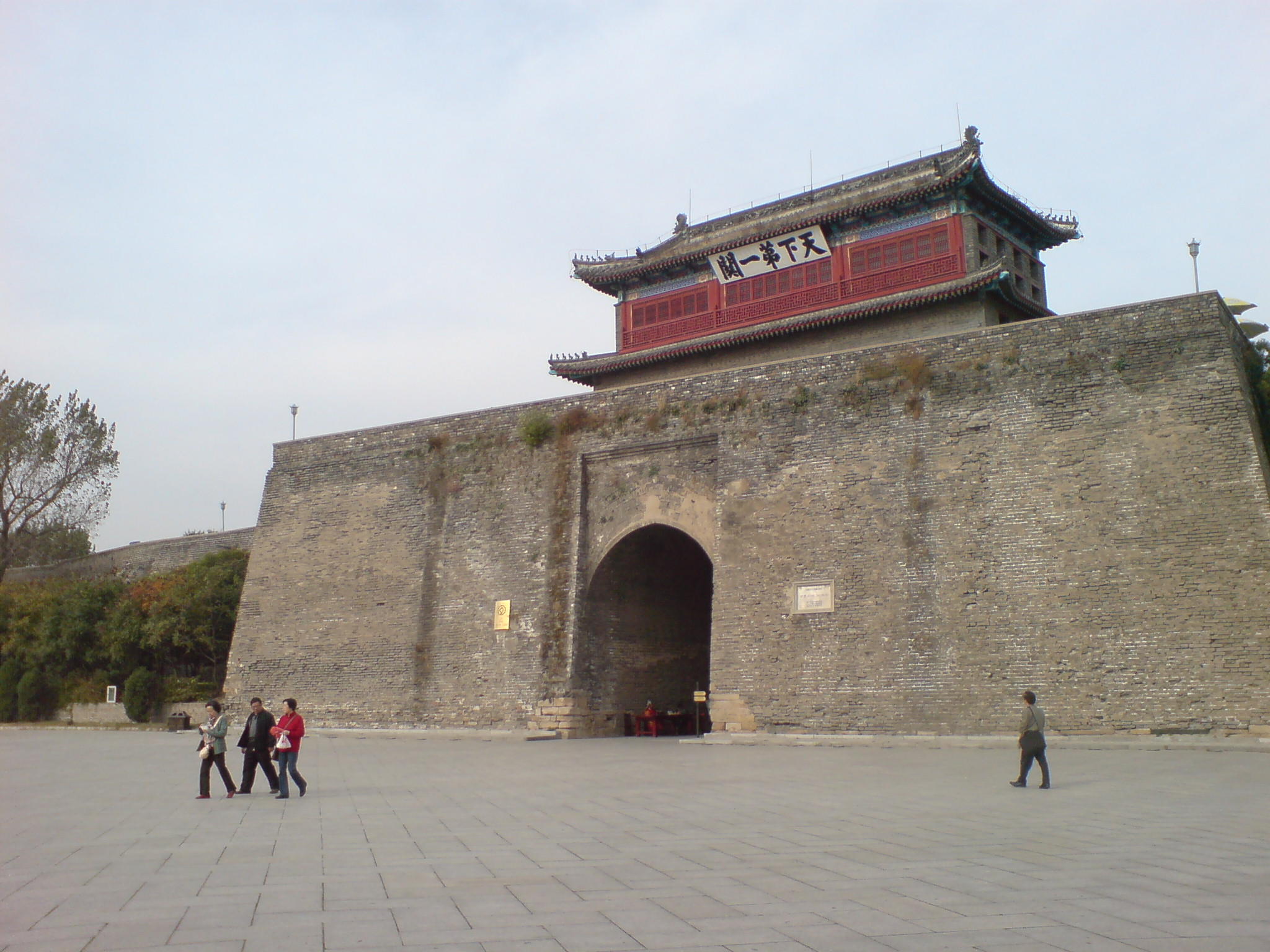
Shanhaiguan along the Great Wall, the gate where the Manchus were repeatedly repelled before being finally let through by Wu Sangui in 1644.

Originally a Ming vassal who officially considered himself a guardian of the Ming border and a local representative of imperial Ming power, Nurhaci, leader of the Jianzhou Jurchens, unified other Jurchen clans to create a new Manchu ethnic identity. During the Japanese invasions of Korea he offered to lead his tribes in support of the Ming army. This offer was declined, but he was granted the title of Dragon-Tiger General for his gesture. Recognizing the weakness in the Ming authority in Manchuria at the time, he took control over all of the other unrelated tribes surrounding his homeland. In 1616 he declared himself Khan and established the Later Jin dynasty in reference to the previous Jurchen-ruled Jin dynasty. In 1618, he openly renounced the Ming overlordship and effectively declared war against the Ming with the "Seven Grievances".

Under the brilliant commander Yuan Chonghuan (1584–1630), the Ming were able to repeatedly fight off the Manchus, notably in 1626 at the Battle of Ningyuan and in 1628. Under Yuan's command the Ming had securely fortified the Shanhai Pass, thus blocking the Manchus from crossing the pass to attack the Liaodong Peninsula. Using European firearms acquired from his cook, he was able to stave off Nurhaci's advances along the Liao River. Although he was named field marshal of all the northeastern forces in 1628, he was executed in 1630 on trumped-up charges of colluding with the Manchus as they staged their raids.

By 1636, the Manchu ruler Hong Taiji renamed his dynasty from the "Later Jin" to "Great Qing" at Shenyang, which had fallen to the Manchu in 1621 and was made their capital in 1625. Hong Taiji also adopted the Chinese imperial title huangdi instead of khan, took the imperial title "Chongde" (Revering Virtue), and changed the ethnic name of his people from Jurchen to Manchu. In 1638 the Manchu defeated and conquered Ming China's traditional ally Korea with an army of 100,000 troops in the Second Manchu invasion of Korea. Shortly after the Koreans renounced their long-held loyalty to the Ming dynasty.

=== Rebellion, invasion, and collapse ===
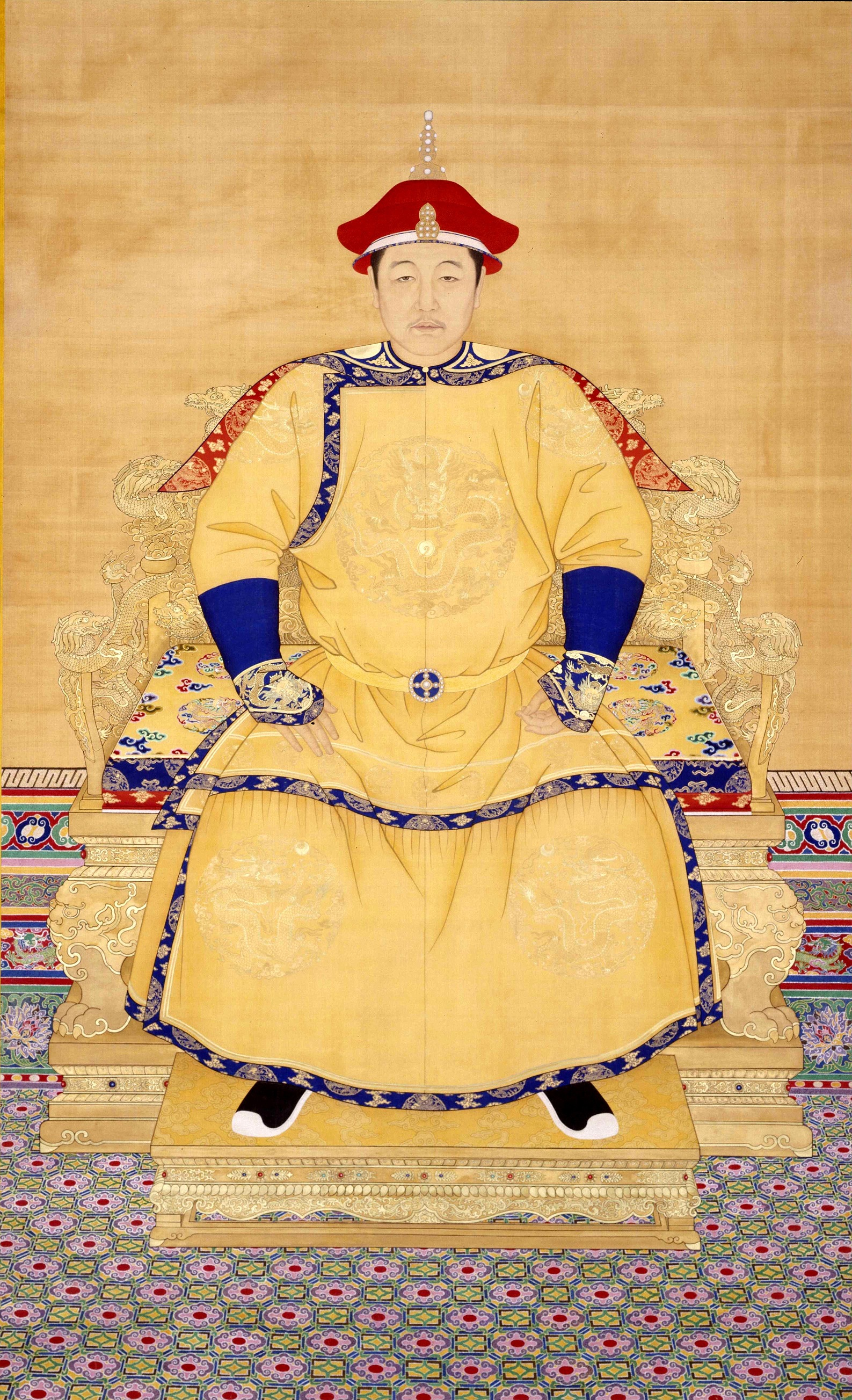
The Shunzhi Emperor (r. 1644–1661), proclaimed the ruler of China on November 8, 1644.

A peasant soldier named Li Zicheng (1606–1644) mutinied with his fellow soldiers in western Shaanxi in the early 1630s after the government failed to ship much-needed supplies there. In 1634 he was captured by a Ming general and released only on the terms that he return to service. The agreement soon broke down when a local magistrate had thirty-six of his fellow rebels executed; Li's troops retaliated by killing the officials and continued to lead a rebellion based in Rongyang, central Henan province by 1635. By the 1640s, an ex-soldier and rival to Li—Zhang Xianzhong (1606–1647)—had created a firm rebel base in Chengdu, Sichuan, while Li's center of power was in Hubei with extended influence over Shaanxi and Henan.

In 1640, masses of Chinese peasants who were starving, unable to pay their taxes, and no longer in fear of the frequently defeated Chinese army, began to form into huge bands of rebels. The Chinese military, caught between fruitless efforts to defeat the Manchu raiders from the north and huge peasant revolts in the provinces, essentially fell apart. Unpaid, unfed, the army was defeated by Li Zicheng—now self-styled as the Prince of Shun—and deserted the capital without much of a fight. Li's forces were allowed into the city when the gates were treacherously opened from within. On 26 May 1644, Beijing fell to a rebel army led by Li Zicheng; during the turmoil, Chongzhen, the last Ming emperor, accompanied only by a eunuch servant, hanged himself on a tree in the imperial garden right outside the Forbidden City.

Seizing opportunity, the Manchus crossed the Great Wall after the Ming border general Wu Sangui (1612–1678) opened the gates at Shanhai Pass. This occurred shortly after he learned about the fate of the capital and an army of Li Zicheng marching towards him; weighing his options of alliance, he decided to side with the Manchus. The Manchu army under the Manchu Prince Dorgon (1612–1650) and Wu Sangui approached Beijing after the army sent by Li was destroyed at Shanhaiguan; the Prince of Shun's army fled the capital on the fourth of June. On 6 June the Manchus and Wu entered the capital and proclaimed the young Shunzhi Emperor ruler of China. After being forced out of Xi'an by the Manchus, chased along the Han River to Wuchang, and finally along the northern border of Jiangxi province, Li Zicheng died there in the summer of 1645, thus ending the Shun dynasty. One report says his death was a suicide; another states that he was beaten to death by peasants after he was caught stealing their food. Zhang Xianzhong was killed in January 1647 when one of his own officers, Liu Jinzhong defected to the Qing and pointed Zhang out to a Manchu archer after he fled Chengdu and employed a scorched earth policy.

Despite the loss of Beijing and the death of the emperor, Ming power was by no means totally destroyed. Nanjing, Fujian, Guangdong, Shanxi, and Yunnan were all strongholds of Ming resistance. However, there were several pretenders for the Ming throne, and their forces were divided. These scattered Ming remnants in southern China after 1644 were collectively designated by 19th-century historians as the Southern Ming. Each bastion of resistance was individually defeated by the Qing until 1662, when the last Southern Ming emperor, Zhu Youlang, the Yongli Emperor, was captured and executed.

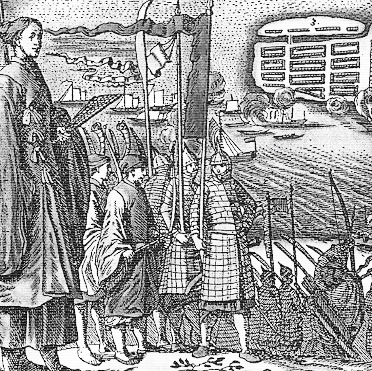
17th-century Dutch drawing of Zheng Chenggong's soldiers with plate armour.

One of the commanders of the Southern Ming, Zheng Chenggong, recognized the futility of battling the Qing on the mainland. In 1661, he made the decision to expel the Dutch from Taiwan and use the island as a base to fight against the invaders. By 1662, Zheng's army had taken control of the island. Although Taiwan was technically considered part of the Ming dynasty, Zheng refused to acknowledge any successor after the execution of the Yongli Emperor. This resulted in a unique situation where there was a monarchy without a monarch, with Zheng holding true power as the commander of the army and effectively establishing a new dynasty. The Zhengs ruled over Taiwan and continued to fight against the Qing under the Ming dynasty's flags until 1683, when the Qing ultimately conquered the island.

== See also ==
- Architecture of the Ming dynasty
- Beijing city fortifications
- Culture of the Ming dynasty
- Fortifications of Xi'an
- Kaifeng flood of 1642
- List of tributaries of Imperial China
- Luchuan-Pingmian Campaigns
- Ming campaign against the Uriankhai
- Ming dynasty in Inner Asia
- Ming Great Wall
- Ming dynasty family tree
- Ming dynasty military conquests
- Ming official headwear
- Timeline of the Ming dynasty
- Treasure voyages
- Ye Chunji (for further information on rural economics in the Ming)
- Zheng Zhilong
- Zheng He
