= Ye Chunji =

- 葉春及

Personal details
- Born: 1532 Huiyang, Huizhou, Guangdong, Ming Dynasty
- Died: 1595 (aged 62–63) Boluo, Huizhou, Guangdong, Ming Dynasty

Chinese name
- Traditional Chinese: 葉春及
- Simplified Chinese: 叶春及
Transcriptions
Standard Mandarin
- Hanyu Pinyin: Yè Chūnjí
- Wade–Giles: Yeh^{4} Ch'un^{1}-chi^{2}
Hakka
- Romanization: Yap^{6} Chun^{1}-kib^{6}
- Pha̍k-fa-sṳ: Ya̍p Chhûn-khi̍p
Yue: Cantonese
- Jyutping: Jip^{6} Ceon^{1}-kap^{6}
Southern Min
- Hokkien POJ: Ia̍p Chhun-ki̍p

Courtesy name
- Chinese: 化甫
Transcriptions
Standard Mandarin
- Hanyu Pinyin: Huà Fǔ
- Wade–Giles: Hua^{4} Fu^{3}
Hakka
- Romanization: Fa^{4} Pu^{3}
- Pha̍k-fa-sṳ: Fa Phú
Yue: Cantonese
- Jyutping: Faa^{3} Fu^{2}
Southern Min
- Hokkien POJ: Hòa Hú

Art name
- Traditional Chinese: 絅齋
- Simplified Chinese: 䌹斋
Transcriptions
Standard Mandarin
- Hanyu Pinyin: Jiǒng Chāi
- Wade–Giles: Chiung^{3} Ch'ai^{1}
Hakka
- Romanization: Kuên^{3} Zai^{1}
- Pha̍k-fa-sṳ: Khúen Châi
Yue: Cantonese
- Jyutping: Gwing^{2} Zaai^{1}
Southern Min
- Hokkien POJ: Kèng Chai

Ye Chunji (Chinese: 葉春及; 1532–1595), courtesy name Huafu (化甫), art name Jiongzhai (絅齋), was a Chinese county official and scholar during the Ming dynasty (1368–1644) of China.

== Life and career ==
He was a native of Guangdong province and served as a county official of Huian County in Fujian province. Although topographic features were part of maps in China for centuries, Ye was the first to base county maps on on-site topographical surveying and observations. His career was sidelined for seventeen years after he became a victim of political vengeance. He came up with a model of county commerce with goods of greatest, great, and lesser importance—the latter being non-subsistence surplus goods that could be traded out of the county for commercial profit.

He issued an order to limit wedding expenses in the 1570s, stating "The frugal man with only one bar of silver currency can have something left over, whereas the extravagant man with a thousand can still not have enough". However, the elites of Huian county and others did not care much for fiscally conservative warnings such as this, and flaunted their wealth in silver.

== Model of county commerce ==
Ye Chunji came up with a ranking model for consumptionary products on the local level that could be applied to his county and many others in the empire. At the top of this pyramid was the "greatest" (zui) product, which was grain; this vital item of subsistence was not traded out of the county as a commercial item. Taxes were paid in grain throughout the Ming dynasty, but as early as 1436 a portion of the grain tax was commuted to payments of silver instead; the 1581 Single whip reform of Zhang Juzheng finally assessed land taxes entirely in silver and not in grain. The middle level of importance in Ye's pyramid of county-level consumptionary goods were so-called "great" (zhong) products, which were mulberry, cotton, hemp, and ramie, the essential raw materials for local textile production. The lowest level in Ye's pyramid of goods were the "lesser" (ci) products, which were salt, cloth, vegetable oil, lumber, sugar, fruit, vegetables, fish, and livestock—all of which were traded out of the county by peddlers, itinerant retailers, or merchant wholesalers shipping large amounts of commercial goods.

Ye Chunji noted that most of these goods from his county made their way to the nearby prefectural capital at Quanzhou. He also noted that outsiders handled the trade in his county and many other Fujian county, which often led to profits being repatriated out of the local county. He did note, however, that linen produced from the county's production of hemp did generate profit that entered the county from outside. Historian Timothy Brook writes that Ye's description of his county gives the impression that most counties in the Ming dynasty relied on self-sufficient agriculture and textile production while they were largely unaffected by and disengaged with regional commodity networks between large urban markets.
