= Franz H. Michael =

German-American sinologist (1907–1992)

- Born: 1907
- Died: 1992 (aged 84–85)

Academic background
- Education: Friedrich-Wilhelm University; Seminar for Oriental Languages; University of Freiburg

Academic work
- Institutions: University of Washington; Georgetown University
- Doctoral students: Frederick W. Mote, Alice L. Miller
- Main interests: Chinese history, Manchu people, Taiping Rebellion

Franz H. Michael (1907–1992) was a German-born American scholar of China, whose teaching career was spent at University of Washington, Seattle, and at The George Washington University in Washington, D.C. Michael's research began with publications concerning the Manchus in China, the Qing dynasty and the Taiping Rebellion against it. He also studied Tibet and Inner Asia, and the tradition of authoritarian government in China, including the People's Republic of China. The themes of despotism, cultural synthesis or assimilation, and the modern fate of Confucian humanism shaped the choice of topics in Michaels' academic work and public advocacy, and his experience in 1930s Germany directly influenced his anti-totalitarian and anti-communist stance.

The festschrift The Modern Chinese State (2000) was dedicated "In Memory of Professor Franz Michael: Scholar, Advocate, and Gentleman". It grew out of a memorial conference at The George Washington University organized by a group of Michael's colleagues and former students.

== Early life and academic career ==
Franz Michael was born in Freiburg im Breisgau, Germany, where his father was a university professor. He enrolled in the Law Faculty of Friedrich-Wilhelm University in Berlin and in the Seminar for Oriental Languages there as well. He received a diploma in sinology in 1930, then transferred to the University of Freiburg and finished his degree there three years later.

In 1934 Michael joined the German diplomatic corps but the Nazi government did not allow him to serve abroad because his father's side of the family was Jewish. He resigned and went to China, where he obtained a post teaching German language at Zhejiang University in Hangzhou. After the outbreak of the Second Sino-Japanese War in 1937, he and his family joined the migration to inland China. In 1939 they went to the United States, where he became a research associate at Johns Hopkins University in Baltimore.

In 1942, he set up a U.S. Army Asian-language training program at the University of Washington, Seattle, where he remained for twenty-two years. After the war, Michael and George E. Taylor organized the Modern Chinese History Project, an Area Studies program that brought together scholars from different disciplines and periods in cooperative research. The group developed a system of analytical categories and created a shared card file of references to organize their research and to facilitate exchange of their findings. In addition to monographs and articles, the group published research guides and indexes. The translation division first translated all available documents of the mid-nineteenth century Taiping Rebellion, then the memorials of the twenty-two leading scholar-officials of the late Qing dynasty.

In 1964, Michael joined the faculty of George Washington University, Washington, D.C., where he taught Asian history and directed the Institute for Sino-Soviet Studies and National Defense Education Center until his retirement.

Michael introduced about 10,000 students to China and the East Asian area. His successful doctoral candidates include Frederick W. Mote, Alice L. Miller, William Johnson, Richard C. Thornton, Philip Huang, James T. Myers, Harry Lamley, Hugh Kang, Harvey Nelson, Felix Moos and Chang Chung-li.

== Scholarship on traditional despotism and modern revolution ==
The themes of despotism, cultural synthesis or assimilation, and the modern fate of Confucian humanism shaped Franz Michael's choice of topics in his academic work and public advocacy, and his experience in 1930s Germany directly influenced his anti-totalitarian and anti-communist stance. One of his students wrote after his death that "These times no longer welcomed voices like that of Franz Michael who advocated that the Chinese Communists should be taken for what they were and, actually, wanted to be, namely true Marxist-Leninists, and who insisted that the Sino-Soviet conflict needed to be analysed in other than the traditional terms of clashing nationalisms."

Michael saw the Chinese Communist Revolution as a producing Leninist totalitarianism that betrayed the Confucian humanist tradition, not a continuation of the despotic rule of the emperors. Michael argued that Mao Zedong's tactics derived from Lenin's strategy delivered by guidance from Moscow and that these tactics were not an independent Chinese invention. In the 1950s, he argued in such respected periodicals as World Politics, Orbis and Problems of Communism that the story of the Communist takeover in China in 1949 was "not that of a peasant revolution but of a movement organized and led by Communists". The Chinese Nationalist government was destroyed in a "military defeat" not by an uprising of the people.

These concerns also shaped his teaching. One of his students, David Shambaugh, wrote that as an undergraduate Michael challenged him, "a young liberal, to see how easy it was for unbridled state power to be used in despotic ways." Michael, he went on, "was one of the first scholars of Asia to apply the totalitarian paradigm (developed to understand modern fascism and Stalinist communism) to the study of Chinese communism, as he recognized that dictatorship knew no cultural boundaries." Shambaugh observed that "this recognition also grew out of his understanding of Oriental Despotism and debates with Karl Wittfogel.

=== The Qing dynasty ===
Michael's first monograph was his 1942 study, The Origins of Manchu Rule in China, which addressed the question of whether conquest dynasties fulfilled the cliche that China absorbed its conquerors. One reviewer at the tme, Knight Biggerstaff, wrote that successive conquests of the empire by neighboring peoples has been one of the "most perpexing episodes in Chinese history." He continued that Michael's "interesting study" of the Manchus also "throws light upon the earlier alien conquests of China." The Manchus "created a mixed culture on the margin of Chinese society and gradually absorbed Chinese ideas and practises as they strengthened themselves against the day when they would be able to extend their power over the entire country." Scholars later argued that Michael placed too much weight on the Manchus absorbing Chinese culture and not enough on their creation of a Manchu identity and a style of rule that used Central Asian traditions more than Chinese ones.

Mark C. Elliott, a Harvard University scholar of Manchu history, however, distinguished "sinicization", that is the process of becoming culturally Chinese, from "absorption," that is, adding Chinese cultural practices without necessarily losing Manchu identity; he felt that Michael's argument was that Manchus exhibited the former before they embarked on their conquest of China in 1644.

The University of Washington Project on Modern History organized translations and monographs on the Taiping Rebellion, the mid-19th century civil war that nearly overthrew the dynasty. One result of the Project was Taiping Rebellion in China, published by The University of Washington Press in three volumes, beginning in 1966. The first volume was Michael's narrative history of the movement; volumes II and III contained annotated translations of all of the significant surviving documents produced by the Taipings. S. Y. Teng, wrote that the project "may be the best analysis of the Taiping Rebellion so far published, but it is by no means the final work". Teng argued that it "should be the best" because the University of Washington group had worked on this period for a long time, with Michael serving as "master writer" who has "judiciously appraised a huge amount of information," and whose "logical organization ties the complicated history together very neatly".

Later writers expressed both respect and also reservations for the argument in the book. Paul Cohen's Discovering History in China applauded Michael and his collaborators for being exceptions to the general Western emphasis on the "shaping role of the Western intrusion". Cohen added that Michael characterized the Taiping organization as "totalitarian" and as providing a "system of total control of all life by the state which had no parallel in Chinese history."

Frederic E. Wakeman dubbed the approach of Michael and his University of Washington collaborators the "Regionalism-Warlordism-Despotism model". He wrote that Michael argued that "the Manchus... were aroused into founding the Qing only after being exposed to Chinese political institutions through the Ming frontier banner system”. Wakeman argued that later research using Manchu language sources had undermined this view. Karl August Wittfogel's conception of Oriental Despotism, Wakeman went on, “appeared to loom behind the entire structure, one imperial dynast after another participating in a steady growth toward greater and great autocracy". The Manchu court's response to the Taiping Rebellion was to allow Han Chinese military leaders to build regional power, creating a precedent for the development of Warlord Era in the twentieth century.

H. Lyman Miller replied that Wakeman and others misread Michael’s views when they assumed that he adopted Wittfogel’s concept of Oriental Despotism. In fact, Miller says, although both were at University of Washington, Michael was not Wittfogel’s student, and Michael disagreed with Wittfogel’s idea that Chinese history was “changeless”. In particular, Michael’s work did not imply that the Taiping Rebellion was the forerunner of Mao’s revolution or that its failure meant that the collapse of the imperial Chinese system left no alternative to revolution.

=== Tibet and Central Asia ===
Michael's work on Central Asia continued in the 1980s with a series of articles and the book, Rule by Incarnation: Tibetan Buddhism and its Role in Society and State. The reviewer in Journal of Asian Studies reported that the book used the sociopolitical theories of Max Weber to analyze the "fully matured religio-political order" of the four centuries before 1959, when the Dalai Lama left Tibet for India. Michaels asks whether a church-state formed on the principle of "rule by incarnation" can be modernized and whether it could have been if it had not been invaded by China. Michael's answer to both questions is "yes." The reviewer in China Quarterly wrote that "as a relatively brief and readable introduction to the subject, the reader could do much worse than to turn to it," commenting that "broadly speaking, this is the Tibetans' 'own' case, fairly made." He added that "one might question the author's view of the Tibetan political system as entirely dominated by Buddhism," paying "little attention to the ethnological level of Tibetan life which, it seems to me, gives Tibetan culture much of its resilience and genius..."

=== The Communist Revolution and the People's Republic ===
In 1956, Michael reviewed recently published works on the Chinese Communist Revolution and how it had come to power in World Politics, a key journal in international relations. He wrote of "misconceptions" and "hurried statements” that saw Mao leading a peasant revolution, for the peasants themselves "never assumed leadership nor were their aims the aims of the Communist revolution". Looking at the root causes, Michael said of China's Response to the West edited by Teng Ssu-yu and John K. Fairbank, that in the end the volume "does not pose or answer the question of why the imperial state and Confucian society were 'altogether abandoned.'" The title of the book and the commentaries in it, wrote Michael, appear to put the blame on the “corrosive influence of Western power and Western ideas”, but on the other hand one may ask “whether an inner logic... had not brought the Confucian order to a point of decline where a new beginning would have been necessary even without the destructive Western influence... . Confucianism had become so formalized and so closely allied to the imperial state that the fall of the Chinese monarchy brought with it the disintegration of Confucian institutions.”

== Major publications ==
=== Books and edited volumes ===
- with George E. Taylor (1956). The Far East in the Modern World. New York: Holt.online
- —— (1942). The Origin of Manchu Rule in China; Frontier and Bureaucracy as Interacting Forces in the Chinese Empire. Baltimore: Johns Hopkins Press.
- ——— (1966). The Taiping Rebellion; History and Documents. Seattle: University of Washington Press. ISBN 0295739592.
- with Gaston Joseph Sigur (1972). The Asian Alliance: Japan and United States Policy. New York: National Strategy Information Center.
- with George E. Taylor (1975). The Far East in the Modern World. Hindsdale, Illinois: Dryden Press. ISBN 0030855551.
- ——— (1977). Mao and the Perpetual Revolution : An Illuminating Study of Mao Tse-Tung's Role in China and World Communism. Woodbury, N.Y.: Barron's. ISBN 0812051327.
- ——— (1982). Rule by Incarnation : Tibetan Buddhism and Its Role in Society and State. Boulder, Colo.: Westview Press. ISBN 0865312265.
- with John Franklin Copper and Yuan-li Wu (1985). Human Rights in Post-Mao China. Boulder, Colo.: Westview Press. ISBN 0813301823.
- ——— (1986). China through the Ages : History of a Civilization. Boulder: Westview Press. ISBN 0865317259.
- ——— (1990). China and the Crisis of Marxism-Leninism. Boulder: Westview Press. ISBN 0813379113.

=== Selected articles ===
- Michael, Franz (1948). "A Revolutionized Kuomintang?". Far Eastern Survey. 17 (14): 161–164. doi:10.2307/3023311. JSTOR 3023311.
- ——— (1949). "Military Organization and Power Structure of China During the Taiping Rebellion". Pacific Historical Review. 18 (4): 469–483. doi:10.2307/3635664. JSTOR 3635664.
- ———; Spector, Stanley (1949). "Cooperative Area Research". World Politics. 2 (1): 148–155. doi:10.2307/2009113. JSTOR 2009113. S2CID 155317741.
- ——— (1955). "State and Society in Nineteenth-Century China". World Politics. 7 (3): 419–433. doi:10.2307/2009000. JSTOR 2009000. S2CID 155075383.
- ——— (1956). "The Fall of China (Review article)". World Politics. 8 (2): 296–306. doi:10.2307/2008976. JSTOR 2008976. S2CID 155026330.
- ——— (1957). "T'ai-P'ing T'ien-Kuo [the Heavenly Kingdom of Great Peace]". The Journal of Asian Studies. 17 (1): 67–76. doi:10.2307/2941336. JSTOR 2941336. S2CID 159763563.
- ——— (1962). "The Role of Law in Traditional, Nationalist and Communist China". The China Quarterly. 9: 124–148. doi:10.1017/s0305741000025273. S2CID 154028955.
- ——— (1986). "Traditional Tibetan Polity and Its Potential for Modernization". The Tibet Journal. 11 (4): 70–78.
- ——— (1987). "Tibetan Social System". The Tibet Journal. 12 (3): 78.
