= Mary C. Wright =

American sinologist and historian (1917-1970)

- Born: Mary Oliver Clabaugh; September 25, 1917; Tuscaloosa, Alabama, U.S.
- Died: June 18, 1970 (aged 52); Guilford, Connecticut, U.S.
- Education: Vassar College (BA); Radcliffe College (MA, PhD)
- Known for: Study of late Qing dynasty and early 20th century China
- Scientific career
- Fields: Sinology
- Workplaces: Yale University; Stanford University
- Notable students: Sherman Cochran, Mark Selden, Jonathan Spence

Mary Clabaugh Wright (born Mary Oliver Clabaugh; Chinese: 芮瑪麗; pinyin: Ruì Mǎlì; September 25, 1917 – June 18, 1970) was an American sinologist and historian who specialized in the study of late Qing dynasty and early twentieth century China. She was the first woman to gain tenure in the Faculty of Arts and Sciences at Yale University, and was subsequently the first woman to be appointed to a full professorship there.

Wright's influential 1957 monograph, The Last Stand of Chinese Conservatism, argued that the mid-19th century T'ung Chih (Tongzhi) Restoration failed because "the requirements of modernization ran counter to the requirements of Confucian stability."

She was married to historian Arthur F. Wright.

== Biography ==
Wright was born Mary Oliver Clabaugh on September 25, 1917, in Tuscaloosa, Alabama. She attended Ramsay High School in Birmingham, Alabama. In 1934 she received a scholarship to Vassar College at Poughkeepsie, New York. After graduating in 1938, she went to Radcliffe College in Cambridge, Massachusetts, to study European history, but she was attracted by John K. Fairbank to investigate modern Chinese history instead. Fairbank recalled that when he first met her, "she seemed "at first glance tall, smooth and beautiful, a bit shy, with a soft southern accent," but "at second glance not so smooth as sharp, a summa from Vassar, tremendously quick and a ferocious worker, racing to keep up with her imagination." She received her Master of Arts in 1939.

On July 6, 1940 she married Arthur F. Wright, who was a graduate student studying Chinese and Japanese history at Harvard University, and the two of them immediately went to Asia to carry out research for their PhDs. For the first year they stayed in Kyoto, Japan, and then in June 1941 they moved to Beijing, China. The pair was caught in China when the United States was brought into the war, and in March 1943 they were interned in the Weixian Internment Camp in Shandong (modern Weifang city). Arthur coaxed fire from dirty coal in the boiler room; she did the hospital laundry. She took advantage of the opportunity to learn Russian. They remained until liberated by American paratroopers in October 1945.

At the end of the war the Wrights decided to remain in China to further their research. Based in Beijing, they traveled throughout China and met important figures, including Mao Zedong. They also became representatives of the Hoover Library, helping to gather a wide range of material for the library (Mary was mainly responsible for these collection activities). Fairbank characterized her style as "accumulating an avalanche of bits and pieces, mixed rarities and handouts; sorting and listing and getting them properly packed actually shipped, meanwhile keeping all in mind and communicating the results." In 1947 they returned to America, and while Arthur joined the faculty at Stanford University, Mary accepted an appointment as curator of the China collection at the Hoover Library at Stanford. She obtained her PhD in 1951 from Radcliffe College, with her dissertation on the Tongzhi Restoration (1862–1874).

In 1959 Arthur and Mary Wright both accepted positions as associate professors in the history department at Yale University. Mary's appointment made her the first woman to gain tenure in the Faculty of Arts and Sciences at Yale University. Fairbank recalled that she defended Owen Lattimore in the 1950s and denounced American bombings of Vietnam in the 1960s. In 1964 she became the first woman to be appointed to a full professorship in the Faculty of Arts and Sciences at Yale. She was responsible for founding the Society for Ch'ing Studies and its journal, Ch'ing-Shih Wen-T'i.

She died at home in Guilford, Connecticut, of lung cancer, aged 52, on June 18, 1970. She and Arthur had two sons, Charles Duncan Wright (born 1950) and Jonathan Arthur Wright (born 1952).

== Legacy ==
The historian Paul A. Cohen in his Discovering History in China notes that Wright, Teng Ssu-yu, Albert Feuerwerker, and Joseph R. Levenson, all students of Fairbank in the decade following the war, were leaders in promoting the paradigm embodied in "China's Response to the West." He praises but critiques Wright's study of the Tongzhi Restoration, The Last Stand of Chinese Conservatism (1957). He quotes Wright that "the Restoration failed because the requirements of modernization ran counter to the requirements of Confucian stability," then questions the "viability of the very terms" in which Wright's argument is set.

== Selected works ==
- Wright, Mary C. (1955). "From Revolution to Restoration: The Transformation of Kuomintang Ideology". The Far Eastern Quarterly. 14 (4): 515–532. doi:10.2307/2941834. JSTOR 2941834. S2CID 143293718.
- —— (1957). The Last Stand of Chinese Conservatism: The T'ung-Chih Restoration, 1862-1874. Stanford: Stanford University Press.
- —— (1961). "The Social Sciences and the Chinese Historical Record". The Journal of Asian Studies. 20 (2): 218–221. doi:10.2307/2050486. JSTOR 2050486. S2CID 147382948.
- —— (1968). China in Revolution: The First Phase, 1900-1913. New Haven, CT: Yale University Press. ISBN 0300014600.

== References and further reading ==
- Cohen, Paul A. (1984). Discovering History in China : American Historical Writing on the Recent Chinese Past. New York: Columbia University Press. ISBN 9780231151924., esp. pp. 20–28 in Ch. 2 "China's Response to the West."
- Fairbank, John K (1970). "In Memory of Mary Clabaugh Wright (1917-1970)". American Historical Review. 75 (6): 1885–1886. doi:10.1086/ahr/75.6.1885. reprinted in Fairbank, John King (1974). China Perceived: Images and Policies in Chinese-American Relations. New York: Knopf. ISBN 0394492048.
