= Albert Feuerwerker =

American sinologist (1927–2013)

Albert Feuerwerker (Chinese:費維愷，November 6, 1927 – April 27, 2013) was a historian of modern China specializing in economic history and long time member of the University of Michigan faculty. He was the president of the Association for Asian Studies in 1991.

== Career ==
On the national scene, Feuerwerker was one of the generation of Cold War scholars who established the field of Area Studies. At the University of Michigan, Feuerwerker was a key organizer of the field of Chinese studies. He served as first director of the Center for Chinese Studies, 1961–1967, and again from 1972 to 1983.

Among his national positions was the presidency of the Association for Asian Studies, 1991–1992. He served as a member, chair or co-chair, of many national organizations, including the Joint Committee on Contemporary China of the American Council of Learned Societies and the Social Science Research Council (1966–1978 and 1980–1983); National Committee on United States-China Relations; member and later vice chairman of the Committee on Scholarly Communication with the People's Republic of China of the National Academy of Sciences, the American Council of Learned Societies and the Social Science Research Council (1971–1978 and 1981–1983). He served on the editorial boards of major academic journals, including the American Historical Review, Journal of Asian Studies, and China Quarterly.

He died in Ann Arbor, 2013, survived by his wife, Yi-tsi Mei Feuerwerker, herself a widely published historian of modern Chinese Literature, and his children, Alison and Paul.

== Scholarly interests ==
Feuerwerker's doctoral dissertation was published as the first volume in the Harvard University Press East Asian series, China's Early Industrialization; Sheng Hsuan-huai (1844–1916) and Mandarin Enterprise (Harvard, 1958), which explored the difficulties of a Confucian government in taking on the tasks of modernization. He continued this theme in "Handicraft and Manufactured Cotton Textiles in China, 1871–1910." (1970), among other articles. Along with Fairbank students Joseph Levenson and Mary C. Wright, Feuerwerker argues in these works that traditional Chinese values were a barrier to modernity and would have to be dismantled before China could make progress. Paul A. Cohen's Discovering History in China critiques Feuerwerker's point of view. Feuerwerker returned to this theme in his Presidential Address to the Association for Asian Studies, "Presidential Address: Questions About China's Early Modern Economic History That I Wish I Could Answer,"

His criticisms and analysis of Marxist historiography of China are represented in articles such as "China's History in Marxian Dress," and "The Ideology of Scholarship: China's New Historiography," with Harold A Kahn. In his edited volume of articles, History in Communist China originally published in China Quarterly, scholars critically analyzed the work of historians in the People's Republic of China on a wide range of topics.

He was editor or co-editor of a number of volumes, including Albert Feuerwerker, Rhoads Murphey, and Mary Wright, eds., Approaches to Modern Chinese History. (Berkeley,: University of California Press, 1967), a collection of essays by fellow students of Fairbank, and volumes of "The Cambridge History of China", a series in which he published several chapters.

== Major publications ==
- China's Early Industrialization; Sheng Hsuan-huai (1844–1916) and Mandarin Enterprise. Cambridge, MA: Harvard University Press, 1958.
- The Chinese Economy, 1912–1949. Ann Arbor: University of Michigan Press, 1968 online
- History in Communist China, MIT Press, 1968 (as editor of 17 essays, 2 his own)
- The Chinese Economy, Ca. 1870–1911 (Michigan Papers in Chinese Studies No. 5), University of Michigan, 1969 online
- Chinese Communist Studies of Modern Chinese History, with Sally Cheng, Harvard University Press, Cambridge, MA, 1970 Google Books. Lists and annotates 500 items.
- Rebellion in Nineteenth-Century China, (Michigan Monographs in Chinese Studies), Center for Chinese Studies, 1975
- The Foreign Establishment in China in the Early Twentieth Century, Ann Arbor (Michigan), 1976
- State and Society in Eighteenth-Century China: The Ch'ing Empire in Its Glory, (Michigan Monographs in Chinese Studies), 1976 ISBN 978-0-89264-027-0
- Economic trends in the Republic of China, 1912–1949, (Michigan Papers in Chinese Studies 31), University of Michigan. Center for Chinese Studies, Ann Arbor, 1977 ISBN 978-0-89264-031-7 online
- Chinese Social and Economic History From the Song to 1900: Report of the American Delegation to a Sino-American Symposium, Beijing, 26 October-1 Nov., by Sino-American Symposium On Chinese Social And Economic History, Center for Chinese Studies, University of Michigan, 1982 ISBN 978-0-89264-045-4
- "The state and the economy in late imperial China." Theory and Society 13.3 (1984): 297-326 online.
- "Economic trends in the late Ch’ing empire, 1870–1911." in The Cambridge History of China 11.part 2 (1980): 1–69.
