= Feuerwerker (name) =

Feuerwerker is a surname. Notable people with the surname include:

- Albert Feuerwerker (1927–2013), an American historian of modern China
- Antoinette Feuerwerker (1912–2003), French jurist and French Resistance fighter
- David Feuerwerker (1912–1980), Swiss-French rabbi, professor of Jewish history

See also
