= China's Response to the West (book) =

1954 volume of historical documents

China's Response To The West: A Documentary Survey, 1839-1923
- Title page for China's Response To The West: A Documentary Survey, 1839-1923 (1963 edition)
- Editor: Teng Ssu-yu; John King Fairbank
- Language: English
- Genre: Non-fiction
- Publisher: Harvard University Press
- Publication date: 1954
- Publication place: United States
- ISBN: 978-0-674-12025-9

China's Response To The West: A Documentary Survey, 1839-1923 is a volume of historical documents translated from the Chinese, edited and with an introduction by Teng Ssu-yu and John King Fairbank, with E-tu Zen Sun, Chaoying Fang, and others. It was published in 1954 by Harvard University Press and reprinted several times in paperback. The documents are primarily essays and official writings on policy issues, starting with a memorial to the throne by Lin Zexu, a Qing dynasty official at the time of the Opium Wars, and finishing with selections from the writings of Liang Qichao and Sun Yat-sen in 1923, just after the New Culture Movement and the founding of the Chinese Communist Party.

The book was influential in spreading the "impact and response" analysis of China's modern history, that is, the idea that China's modern history could best be viewed as a series of responses to the impact of the West, and has been blamed for the widespread idea that China's modernity was not generated internally but had to wait for the impact of the West.

== Background ==
Both editors were trained by Chinese historians in China in the 1930s. John Fairbank was influenced by his Chinese academic supervisors, especially Tsiang Tingfu, a Columbia University trained Chinese historian. Teng Ssu-yu studied as an undergraduate at Yenching University, where he then taught for several years before coming to the United States in 1937.

The Introduction explains that the book is "a survey of one of the most interesting, but neglected aspects of modern history -- the way in which the scholar-official class of China, faced with the aggressive expansion of the modern West, tried to understand an alien civilization and take action to preserve their own culture and their political and social institutions"; its over-running by the West was "bound to create a continuing and violent intellectual revolution...."

An accompanying Research Guide gave bibliographic references and research comments.

== Reception and changing views ==
The University of Washington historian Franz H. Michael recommended the book for understanding the Communist conquest of China not as a matter of post-war developments but "against the double background of world Communism and the modern history of China." China was vulnerable to Communist onslaught because of a transformation that began in the middle of the 19th century. This transformation led to an attack on her entire cultural system, which was dominated by the scholar-gentry elite that also dominated the political system. The reaction of this class to the Western impact, Michael continued, is the theme of the book. The book traces the stages of the reaction and a "natural chronology" through an "excellent selection" of the "most important documents of each period and each point of view", providing a "kaleidoscopic picture" of these developments. The volume does not directly pose the question, Michael continued, of why the Confucian tradition was "totally rejected". He wonders whether "the inner logic of its development had not brought the Confucian order to a point where a new beginning would have been necessary even without the destructive Western influence."

The historian Paul A. Cohen, a student of Fairbank's, in his Discovering History in China, an influential critique of post-war American histories of China, devoted a chapter to the book and its influence, "The Problem with 'China's Response to the West'". Cohen notes that Teng and Fairbank wrote that the terms "impact" and "response" were "not very precise," and "until we can work out a more precise analytic framework, the title of this study will remain more metaphorical than scientific." They call for caution in applying the "impact and response framework," but Cohen writes that later historians, including Fairbank himself, did not heed this warning. Cohen sees several problems with the "impact-response" framework. One is that it ignores the "enigmatic and contradictory nature of the modern West," which is neither unified nor unchanging. Another is that "China" was equally diverse in its traditions and modes of response.

The historian Foster Rhea Dulles judged the book to be "fascinating and highly important" and the first translation into a European language of "a body of material that casts a sharp and illuminating light on how representatives of China's scholar-official class" attempted to control China's response to Europe and the USA during the years from 1839 to 1923.
