= Sherman Cochran =

- Traditional Chinese: 高家龍
- Simplified Chinese: 高家龙
Transcriptions
Standard Mandarin
- Hanyu Pinyin: Gāo Jiālóng
- Wade–Giles: Kao1 Chia1-lung2

Sherman Cochran (Chinese: 高家龍; pinyin: Gāo Jiālóng; born 1940) is an American sinologist. He is the Hu Shih Professor Emeritus of Chinese History at Cornell University.

== Early life and education ==
Cochran was born in St. Johns, Portland, Oregon, in 1940. He is a graduate of Roosevelt High School. After high school, Cochran graduated from Yale University with a Bachelor of Arts in 1962. As an undergraduate, he was a football player for the Yale Bulldogs and Ivy League athletic honors in his junior year.

Cochran developed an interest in Chinese history when, after college, he spent time living in Hong Kong, where he was teaching English under the Yale-China Association Program at New Asia College in Kowloon. He returned to Yale to pursue graduate studies in Chinese, earning his M.A. in 1967 in Chinese history and his Ph.D. in Chinese history in 1975. In graduate school, he was a student of sinologists Mary C. Wright and Jonathan D. Spence.

== Academic career ==
Cochran joined the Cornell faculty in 1973 as an assistant professor and was promoted to full professor in 1986. He was a Fellow at the Woodrow Wilson International Center for Scholars, Washington, D.C. between 1998 and 1999, and the Henry Luce Senior Fellow at the National Humanities Center, Research Triangle Park, North Carolina, between 2002 and 2003. Cochran was appointed the Hu Shih Professor of Chinese History in July 2004.

In May 2010, the China and Asia-Pacific Studies (CAPS) Program at Cornell decided to establish the Sherman Cochran Prize in honor of Professor Cochran, Hu Shih Professor of Chinese History and CAPS founding director, for his great contribution to the establishment and development of the program.

== Family ==
Cochran is married to historian Maria Cristina Garcia, a historian of immigration and refugee history, who also works at Cornell. He retired in 2012 but maintains an active research program.

== Publications ==
Books

- The Lius of Shanghai. Cambridge: Harvard University Press, 2013.
- Cities in Motion: Interior, Coast and Diaspora in Transnational China. Berkeley: University of California Institute of East Asian Studies, 2007. Co-edited with David Strand.
- Chinese Medicine Men: Consumer Culture in China and Southeast Asia. Cambridge: Harvard University Press, 2006.

Awarded the 2008 Joseph Levenson Book Prize by the Association for Asian Studies for making "the greatest contribution to increasing understanding of the history, culture, society, politics, or economy of China" since 1900.

- Encountering Chinese Networks: Western, Japanese, and Chinese Corporations in China, 1880-1937. Berkeley: University of California Press, 2000. Chinese translation by Cheng Linsun: Da gongsi yu guanxi wang: Zhongguo jingnei de Xifang, Riben he Hua shang da qiye (1880-1937). Shanghai shehui kexueyuan chubanshe, 2002.
- Inventing Nanjing Road: Commercial Culture in Shanghai, 1900-1945. Ithaca: Cornell East Asia Series, 1999.
- Big Business in China: Sino-Foreign Rivalry in the Cigarette Industry, 1890-1930. Cambridge: Harvard University Press, 1980.

Articles

- "Capitalists Choosing Communist China," in Jeremy Brown and Paul Pickowicz, eds., Dilemmas of Victory: The Early Years of the People's Republic of China. Cambridge: Harvard University Press, 2007. pp. 359–385.
- “Three Challenges for Scholars in Chinese Business History.” In Zhang Zhongmin and Lu Xinglong, eds., Qiye fazhan zhongde zhidu bianqian (Institutional change in Chinese business history). Shanghai: Shanghai shehui kexueyuan chubanshe, 2003, pp. 1–17. (In Chinese.)
- “Marketing Medicine and Advertising Dreams in China, 1900-1950,” in Wen-hsin Yeh, ed., Becoming Chinese: Passages to Modernity and Beyond, 1900-1950. Berkeley: University of California Press, 2000. pp. 62–97.
