= Hosea Ballou Morse =

Historian of China (1855–1934)

- Born: Nova Scotia, British North America
- Died: February 13, 1934 (aged 78)
- Occupations: customs official, diplomat, historian

Academic background
- Education: Harvard University

Academic work
- Discipline: International relations, economic history, numismatics
- Influenced: John K. Fairbank

Hosea Ballou Morse (18 July 1855 – 13 February 1934) was a British North American-born British customs official and historian of China. He served in the Chinese Imperial Maritime Custom Service from 1874 to 1908, but is best known for his scholarly publications after his retirement, most prominently The International Relations of the Chinese Empire, a three volume chronicle of the relations of the Qing dynasty with Western countries, and The Chronicles of the East India Company Trading to China, 1635–1834.

Morse descended from New England stock although for five generations his family lived in Nova Scotia, where he was born. The family returned to Medford, Massachusetts when Morse was young. He attended Boston Latin School and graduated from Harvard College in 1874, where he was a member of Phi Beta Kappa. He married Annie Josephine Welsford in London on February 8, 1881. The couple had no children of their own. After Morse's retirement, they lived in Surrey, England, and during World War I he became a British citizen. He was granted an honorary LL.D. from Western Reserve University in 1913 and an Honorary LL.D. from Harvard in his Fiftieth Reunion year, 1924. He died in on February 13, 1934, in Surrey, England.

== Maritime Customs Service ==
In his senior year of college, Morse and three of his Harvard classmates were recruited to join the Imperial Maritime Custom Service under Sir Robert Hart, who had headed the Service since 1860. Morse was at first stationed in Shanghai, where he studied the northern dialect, Mandarin, for an hour each day before breakfast, and then served in Beijing. His spoken Chinese became good enough for interpreting day-to-day business, but he could not read well enough to handle a wide variety of texts. He was posted to Xinjiang in 1877, doing extra duty for the Northern Chinese Famine of that winter and the following summer. When posted to the London office of the Customs Service, he met Annie Josephine Welsford – "Nan" – who had been born in Brooklyn to British parents. They were married in 1881. While in London, Morse also joined the Royal Asiatic Society and met a number of the leading Orientalists of the time. On the couple's subsequent posting to Tianjin, Nan took an almost instant dislike to China and the Chinese, though it is not clear how this affected her husband's attitudes. Morse was involved under Li Hongzhang's direction, in the diplomacy surrounding the Sino-French War of 1885 for which he received the Order of the Double Dragon, third division, second class. In the following years Morse helped to audit and supervise the China Merchants' Steam Navigation Company, a joint venture between Chinese officials and merchants. He worked with Sheng Xuanhuai, but ran into trouble negotiating the political currents. Upon his resignation from the company in 1877, he was reassigned to Shanghai, where he supervised the Statistical Department. In the North China Branch of the Royal Asiatic Society, he found himself one of some two hundred and fifty members, most of whom worked for the Customs Service, and soon became one of the most productive. He and Nan were sent to Beihai, on the north coast of the Gulf of Tonkin, in 1889, and then on a two-year leave in the United States. Their next posting was to Tamsui in Taiwan, where he was an important witness to the Japanese invasion of Taiwan in 1895. He then served in Beihai once more, Youzhou, Hunan, and Hankou. Poor health forced him to take leave from 1900–1903, but he returned to the Customs Service to head the Statistical Service from 1904 to 1908. He retired from the Customs Service in 1908.

== Second career: Morse the scholar and his role in the study of China ==
Upon his retirement in 1908, rather than return to New England, which his wife disliked almost as much as China, the couple took up residence in Surrey, England. In 1909 he turned down feelers from the American government to become Ambassador to China. During the First World War, he became a British citizen (as he had been born in a British colony). He traveled frequently to the United States, and kept up relations with his Harvard classmates, including Charles Franklin Thwing, president of Western Reserve University. A long-time smoker, he died of pneumonia in February, 1934.

Morse published his first large work in 1908, the year of his retirement, The Trade and Administration of the Chinese Empire. The first volume of The International Relations of the Chinese Empire came out in 1910 (the third and last volume in 1918). Articles in magazines and journals included "A Short Lived Republic," which recounted his resistance to the 1895 takeover of Taiwan by Japan and the attempt to establish an independent nation. His novel, In the Days of the Taipings drew on the material in Volume II of International Relations to portray the viewpoints of both foreigners and of the Taiping leaders who rebelled against the dynasty which Morse had served. His most ambitious project was the massive documentary study of the British East India Company based on records in London's India Office, Chronicles of the East India Company. He had first contemplated the study in 1919, and was able to carry it out only because the India Office allowed him to remove the record books and ledgers and work on them at home. He scrupulously summarized and edited some two hundred years of trade and commercial relations of the Company, giving historians a lasting documentary.

Western study of China was changing, however. John K. Fairbank went to Morse for scholarly guidance in 1929 and considered himself a disciple. He wrote that although the older scholar lived through the decades of foreign imperialism and the collapse of the Qing empire, his historical work "avoids the obtrusive chauvinism of the Western treaty port community of that period." He recalled that "to me, as to other beginners, he offered generous encouragement and wise counsel." Fairbank characterized The International Relations of the Chinese Empire as "the most comprehensive history of modern China" in its time, but added that it was "foreign-documented bluebook history," that is, diplomatic history which described foreign wars and treaties – "what was done in and to China by foreigners." He noted that in the 1930s, a new generation of China specialists (including himself) chose to explore and emphasize the Chinese part of the story and what he called "China's response to the West." That is, the new focus was on China, not the West. Fairbank noted that Morse "records the criticisms.... but gives little indication of the more positive side of the Confucian tradition, including its effort to maintain the ideals of loyalty and public service, and its capacity for reform." Morse, moreover, was isolated from Chinese colleagues because of his wife's strong dislike of them—by having few Chinese friends, he was "flying on one wing." Morse had neither the documents from the Chinese archives nor the conceptual tools of later scholars. Although he supplied chapter and verse for foreign aggression in China, "imperialism" was not mentioned as such. Nevertheless, even today there is still no other English language survey of China's diplomatic relations in the nineteenth century. International Relations was a sourcebook basic to such Marxist surveys as Hu Sheng's Imperialism and Chinese Politics (1952) and a Chinese translation was published in Beijing in 1957. The recent opening of archives in China has made available Maritime Commission documents which are not available outside that country, and Morse's contributions will be further revised.

Morse's knowledge of Chinese money (from hands-on experience in the Customs) was excellent, and his works on Chinese money and Chinese numismatics remain essential references. Morse's personal collection of Chinese coins was acquired by the British Museum in the 1880s.

== Major works ==
- —, The Currency of China. Shanghai: Kelly & Walsh. 1906.
- —, The Gilds of China (1st ed 1909 / 2nd ed 1932). London: Longmans, Green, and Co.
- —, The International Relations of the Chinese Empire. London: Longmans, Green, and Co., 1910–1918. 3 v.

Volume I: The Period of Conflict, 1834–1860
Volume II: The Period of Submission, 1861–1893
Volume III: The Period of Subjection, 1894–1911

- —, The Trade and Administration of China (1st ed 1908 / 2nd ed 1913 / 3rd ed 1920). London: Longmans, Green and Co.
- —, The Chronicles of the East India Company Trading to China, 1635–1834. Oxford: The Clarendon Press. 1926–1929. 5 v. (Vol. 1 / Vol. 2 / Vol. 3 / Vol. 4 / Vol. 5)
- —, In the Days of the Taipings, Being the Recollections of Ting Kienchang. Salem, Mass: The Essex Institute, 1927. A novel.
- —, and Harley Farnsworth MacNair, Far Eastern International Relations. Boston, New York: Houghton Mifflin, 1931. Rpr. Russell & Russell, 1967.
- —, Huiwen Zhang tr., Zhonghua Di Guo Dui Wai Guan Xi Shi. Beijing: Sheng huo, du shu Xin hua, 1957. Translation of International Relations.
- —, Harley Farnsworth MacNair, (Zengyi Yao, tr.) Yuan Dong Guo Ji Guan Xi Shi. Shanghai: Shanghai shu dian chu ban she, 1998. ISBN 7-80622-412-2.
