= Thomas Levenson =

American academic, science writer and documentary film-maker

Thomas Levenson is an American academic, science writer and documentary film-maker. As of 2012, he is Professor of Science Writing and director of the graduate program in science writing at the Massachusetts Institute of Technology. He has written eight books:

- Ice Time: Climate, Science and Life on Earth;
- Measure for Measure: A Musical History of Science;
- Einstein in Berlin;
- The Hunt for Vulcan: And How Albert Einstein Destroyed a Planet, Discovered Relativity, and Deciphered the Universe (shortlisted for the Royal Society Insight Investment Science Book Prize 2016);
- Newton and the Counterfeiter,
- Money for Nothing: The Scientists, Fraudsters, and Corrupt Politicians Who Reinvented Money, Panicked a Nation, and Made the World Rich;
- So Very Small: How Humans Discovered the Microcosmos, Defeated Germs–and May Still Lose the War Against Infectious Disease
- A Pox on Fools. The True Believers, Grifters, and Cynics Who Convinced Us to Reject Vaccines

He also writes articles and reviews for newspapers and magazines.

== Biography ==
Levenson's father was Joseph R. Levenson, a professor of history at University of California, Berkeley.

He earned his bachelor's degree in History of Science from Harvard University.

He is married and lives in Massachusetts with his wife and son.
