= List of emperors of the Northern dynasties =

The Northern dynasties (北朝 běi cháo) describe a succession of Chinese empires that coexisted alongside a series of Southern dynasties. The era is generally described as the Northern and Southern dynasties, lasting from 420–589 AD after the Jin and before the Sui dynasty.

The Northern dynasties were as follows:

- Northern Wei (386–534 AD)
- Eastern Wei (534–550 AD)
- Western Wei (535–557 AD)
- Northern Qi (550–577 AD)
- Northern Zhou (557–581 AD)

Posthumous names (Shi Hao 諡號)	Birth names	Periods of reign	Era names (Nian Hao 年號) and their according range of years
Northern Wei dynasty 386–535
Convention: Northern Wei + posthumous name
As a well known fact Tuoba family changed their family name to 元(Yuán) during the reign of Xiao Wen Di in 496 so we will also change from there.
Dao Wu Di (道武帝 dao4 wu3 di4)	Tuoba Gui (拓跋珪 tou4 ba2 gui1)	386–409	Dengguo (登國 deng1 guo2) 386–396; Huangshi (皇始 Huáng shǐ) 396–398; Tianxing (天興 tian1 xing1) 398–404; Tianci (天賜 tian1 ci4) 404–409
Ming Yuan Di (明元帝 ming2 yuan2 di4)	Tuoba Si (拓跋嗣 tou4 ba2 si4)	409–423	Yongxing (永興 yong3 xing1) 409–413; Shenrui (神瑞 shen2 rui4) 414–416; Taichang (泰常 tai4 chang2) 416–423
Tai Wu Di (太武帝 tai4 wu3 di4)	Tuoba Tao (拓跋燾 tou4 ba2 tao2)	424–452	Shiguang (始光 shi3 guang1) 424–428; Shenjia (神(鹿下加) shen2 jia1) 428–431; Yanhe (延和 yan2 he2) 432–434; Taiyan (太延 tai4 yan2) 435–440; Taipingzhenjun (太平真君 tai4 ping2 zhen1 jun1) 440–451; Zhengping (正平 zheng4 ping2) 451–452
Nan An Wang (南安王 nan2 an1 wang2)	Tuoba Yu (拓跋余 tou4 ba2 yu2)	452	Yongping (永平 yong3 ping2) or Chengping (承平 cheng2 ping2) 452
Wen Cheng Di (文成帝 wen2 cheng2 di4)	Tuoba Jun (拓跋濬 tou4 ba2 jun4)	452–465	Xingan (興安 xing1 an1) 452–454; Xingguang (興光 xing1 guang1) 454–455; Taian (太安 tai4 an1) 455–459; Heping (和平 he2 ping2) 460–465
Xian Wen Di (獻文帝 xian4 wen2 di4)	Tuoba Hong (拓跋弘 tou4 ba2 hong2)	466–471	Tianan (天安 tian1 an1) 466–467; Huangxing (皇興 huang2 xing1) 467–471
Xiao Wen Di (孝文帝 xiao4 wen2 di4)	Yuan Hong (元宏 yuan2 hong2)	471–499	Yanxing (延興 yan2 xing1) 471–476; Chengming (承明 cheng2 ming2) 476; Taihe (太和 tai4 he2) 477–499
Xuan Wu Di (宣武帝 xuan1 wu3 di4)	Yuan Ke (元恪 yuan2 ke4)	500–515	Jingming (景明 jing3 ming2) 500–503; Zhengshi (正始 zheng4 shi3) 504–508; Yongping (永平 yong3 ping2) 508–512; Yanchang (延昌 yan2 chang1) 512–515
Xiao Ming Di (孝明帝 xiao4 ming2 di4)	Yuan Xu (元詡 yuan2 xu3)	516–528	Xiping (熙平 xi1 ping2) 516–518; Shengui (神龜 shen2 gui1) 518–520; Zhengguang (正光 zheng4 guang1) 520–525; Xiaochang (孝昌 xiao4 chang1) 525–527; Wutai (武泰 wu3 tai4) 528
Xiao Zhuang Di (孝莊帝 xiao4 zhuang1 di4)	Yuan Zi You (元子攸 yuan2 zi5 you1)	528–530	Jianyi (建義 jian4 yi4) 528; Yongan (永安 yong3 an1) 528–530
Chang Guang Wang (長廣王 chang2 guang3 wang2) or Jing Di (敬帝 jing4 di4)	Yuan Ye (元曄 yuan2 ye4)	530–531	Jianming (建明 jian4 ming2) 530–531
Jue Min Di (節閔帝 jie2 min3 di4)	Yuan Gong (元恭 yuan2 gong1)	531–532	Putai (普泰 pu3 tai4) 531–532
An Ding Wang (安定王 an1 ding4 wang2) or Chu Di (出帝 chu1 di4)	Yuan Lang (元朗 yuan2 lang3)	531–532	Zhongxing (中興 zhong1 xing1) 531–532
Xiao Wu Di (孝武帝 xiao1 wu3 di4)	Yuan Xiu (元脩 yuan2 xiu1)	532–535	Taichang (太昌 tai4 chang1) 532; Yongxing (永興 yong3 xing1) 532; Yongxi (永熙 yong3 xi1) 532–535
Eastern Wei dynasty 534–550
Convention: Eastern Wei + posthumous name
Xiao Jing Di (孝靜帝 xiao1 jing4 di4)	Yuan Shan Jian (元善見 yuan2 shan4 jian4)	534–550	Tianping (天平 tian1 ping2) 534–537; Yuanxiang (元象 yuan2 xiang4) 538–539; Xinghe (興和 xing1 he2) 539–542; Wuding (武定 wu3 ding4) 543–550
Northern Qi dynasty 550–577
Convention: Northern Qi + posthumous name
Wen Xuan Di (文宣帝 wen2 xuan1 di4)	Gao Yang (高洋 gao1 yang2)	550–559	Tianbao (天保 tain1 bao3) 550–559
Fei Di (廢帝 fei4 di4)	Gao Yin (高殷 gao1 yin1)	560	Qian Ming (乾明 qian2 ming2) 560
Xiao Zhao Di (孝昭帝 xiao1 zhao1 di4)	Gao Yan (高演 gao1 yan3)	560–561	Huangjian (皇建 huang2 jian4) 560–561
Wu Cheng Di (武成帝 wu3 cheng2 di4)	Gao Zhan (高湛 gao1 zhan4)	561–565	Taining (太寧 tai4 ning2) 561–562; Heqing (河清 he2 qing1) 562–565
Hou Zhu (後主 hou4 zhu3)	Gao Wei (高緯 gao1 wei3)	565–577	Tiantong (天統 tian1 tong3) 565–569; Wuping (武平 wu3 ping2) 570–576; Longhua (隆化 long2 hua3) 576
You Zhu (幼主 you4 zhu3)	Gao Heng (高恆 gao1 heng2)	577	Chengguang (承光 cheng2 guang1) 577
Fan Yang Wang (范陽王 fan4 yang2 wang2)	Gao Shao Yi (高紹義 gao1 shao4 yi4)	577–579?	Did not exist
Western Wei dynasty 535–556
Convention: Western Wei + posthumous name
Wen Di (文帝 wen2 di4)	Yuan Bao Ju (元寶炬 yuan2 bao3 ju4)	535–551	Datong (大統 da4 tong3) 535–551
Fei Di (廢帝 fei4 di4)	Yuan Qin (元欽 yuan2 qin1)	552–554	Did not exist
Gong Di (恭帝 gong1 di4)	Yuan Kuo (元廓 yuan2 kuo4)	554–556	Did not exist
Northern Zhou dynasty 557–581
Convention: Northern Zhou + posthumous name
Xiao Min Di (孝閔帝 xiao1 min3 di4)	Yuwen Jue (宇文覺 yu3 wen2 jue2)	557	Did not exist
孝明帝 xiao4 ming2 di4)	Yuwen Yu (宇文毓 yu3 wen2 yu4)	557–560	Wucheng (武成 wu3 cheng2) 559–560
Wu Di (武帝 wu3 di4)	Yuwen Yong (宇文邕 yu3 wen2 yong1)	561–578	Baoding (保定 bao3 ding4) 561–565; Tianhe (天和 tian1 he2) 566–572; Jiande (建德 jian4 de2) 572–578; Xuanzheng (宣政 xuan1 zheng4) 578
Xuan Di (宣帝 xuan1 di4)	Yuwen Yun (宇文贇 yu3 wen2 yun1)	578–579	Dacheng (大成 da4 cheng2) 579
Jing Di (靜帝 jing4 di4)	Yuwen Chan (宇文闡 yu3 wen2 chan3)	579–581	Daxiang (大象 da4 xiang4) 579–581; Dading (大定 da4 ding4) 581

== See also ==
- List of emperors of the Southern dynasties
- Northern and Southern dynasties
- Chinese sovereign
- Conquest dynasty
- Mongolization
- De-Sinicization
