= Japanese Studies of Modern China, A Bibliographical Guide to Historical and Social Science Research on the 19th and 20th Centuries =

Book by John King Fairbanks and Masataka Banno

Japanese Studies of Modern China, A Bibliographical Guide to Historical and Social Science Research on the 19th and 20th Centuries is a 1955 bibliography by John King Fairbank and Masataka Banno (坂野 正高 Banno Masataka). It was published by Charles E. Tuttle Company on behalf of the Harvard Yenching Institute.

Most entries had to do with contemporary China circa 1955 though some included entries relating to earlier periods. The work includes an introduction and, listed by topic, over 1,000 entries. There are also three indices.

A new 1971 edition was co-authored by Fairbank, Banno, and Sumiko Yamamoto (山本 澄子, Yamamoto Sumiko) and published directly by Harvard University Press. Some spellings of Japanese names and some dates and references were corrected.

== Background ==
After the Chinese Communist Revolution in 1949, American academics were no longer traveling to Mainland China to do research. This meant that many such academics went to Japan and accessed academic literature about China there. This also meant that Japanese researchers had to do research about Mainland China in Japan.

The book used data taken from research agencies of Japan. These agencies had surveyed, in addition to the Republic of China territory, Manchuria, Mongolia, and Taiwan.

== Contents ==
The authors aimed to have a comprehensive list, with the authors stating that some entries were of a Marxist-Leninist character and/or, in the words of Marius B. Jansen of the University of Washington, "warn the reader against them". Jansen characterized most comments as "[seeming] judicious and careful" with the exception of some entries about works about international relations.

== Reception ==
Jansen called the work an "excellent guide".

Derk Bodde of University of Pennsylvania stated that he had some "criticisms[...]none really crucial" including that it listed too much material, that it does not mention the names of the 25 Japanese persons who assisted them, and that the introduction was too short.

C. Martin Wilbur of Columbia University described the work as "an example of how fruitful the collaboration of an American and a Japanese scholar may be." Wilbur added that "Professor Fairbank's inexhaustible quest for the understanding of China" was "the spirit underlying this work, and suffusing it".
