= Conquest dynasty =

Dynasties of China ruled by non-Han ethnicities

In the history of China, a conquest dynasty (Chinese: 征服王朝; pinyin: Zhēngfú Wángcháo) is a dynasty established by non-Han ethnicities who ruled parts or all of China proper – the traditional heartlands of the Han people – via military invasion and conquest. The ruling sovereigns and aristocracy of such dynasties may or may not have assimilated into the dominant Han culture, and may or may not even acknowledged themselves as Chinese. The term was coined in 1949 by German-American sinologist Karl August Wittfogel (1896–1988), who described four major dynasties as what traditionally would have been considered "conquest dynasties":

- The Liao dynasty (916–1125), established by the Yelü Khitans, who ruled over the Northeast China Plain and northern parts of the North China Plain after conquering the Later Jin dynasty;
- The Jin dynasty (1115–1234), established by the Wanyan Jurchens, who overthrew the Liao dynasty and ended the Northern Song dynasty;
- The Yuan dynasty (1271–1368), established by the Borjigin Mongols, who rules over all of China after conquering the Southern Song. It was originally a division of the Mongol Empire (1206–1368), who once conquered all of Northeast and North China plains after defeating the Western Xia and Jin dynasties, and;
- The Qing dynasty (1644–1912), established by the Aisin Gioro Manchus, who exploited the collapse of the Ming dynasty and conquered all of China after defeating the Shun, Xi and Southern Ming regimes.

An alternative concept to "conquest dynasty", also coined by Wittfogel, is the "infiltration dynasty", which describes dynastic regimes established by non-Han peoples who had already partly assimilated into the court politics and social hierarchy of Han-dominated dynasties before seizing power via coup d'état or rebellion. Examples of such dynasties include the various Northern dynasties (mostly founded by Xianbei rulers), the short-lived Yan dynasty (founded by Sogdian rebels) and three of the Five dynasties (i.e. Later Tang, Later Jin and Later Han, which were ruled by fully sinicized Shatuo sovereigns).

== Concept ==
Karl August Wittfogel coined the term "conquest dynasty" in his 1949 revisionist history of the Liao dynasty. He argued that the Khitan-ruled Liao, as well as the Jurchen-ruled Jin, the Mongol-ruled Yuan and the Manchu-ruled Qing dynasties were not really "Chinese", but are foreign regimes whose primary association with China was the result of short-term invasive conquests and their ruling families did not fully commit to assimilating into the dominant Han Chinese culture. Meanwhile, not all non-Han regimes were seen as "conquest dynasties" by Wittfogel: he considered some of these regimes, such as the Northern Wei, to be "infiltration dynasties".

The "conquest dynasty" concept was warmly received by mostly Japanese scholars such as Otagi Matsuo, who preferred to view these dynasties in the context of a "history of Asia" rather than a "history of China". Alternative views to the "conquest dynasty" concept include American sinologist Owen Lattimore's idea of the Eurasian Steppe as a "reservoir", Wolfram Eberhard's concept of a "superstratification" of Chinese society with nomadic peoples, and Mary C. Wright's thesis of sinicization. Among historians, the labelling of "conquest dynasties" has proven to be controversial, especially when using such characterization on dynasties such as the Jin.

== Scope of China (Zhongguo) ==
In the English language, "Zhongguo ren" (中國人; "People of China") is frequently confused and conflated with "Han ren" (漢人; "Han people").

The term Zhongguo was used initially around the tenth century BCE and did not refer to any specific ethnicity. This ambiguity allowed different interchangeable definitions to come into existence later on. Dynasties of ethnic Han origin used "Zhongguo" (中國; "Middle Kingdom") to refer to Han areas of their empire. Non-Han founders of dynasties used the term to refer to a combined state of Hans and non-Hans. The Ming dynasty used Zhongguo politically to refer to the entire country but culturally to refer to only Han areas of the empire.

The Xianbei-led Northern Wei referred to itself as "Zhongguo" and claimed yogurt as a food of Zhongguo. Similarly, the Jurchen-led Jin dynasty referred to itself as "Zhongguo".

In 1271, Kublai Khan proclaimed the Yuan dynasty with the official name "Great Yuan" (大元) and claimed succession from former Chinese dynasties from the Three Sovereigns and Five Emperors up to the Tang dynasty. Han Chinese literati during the Mongol period thought that China, after a few centuries of division and dissension, was finally reunified by the Yuan dynasty. Their view was not shared by all contemporaries, especially the Mongols and other non-Han people (Semu) who had quite different ideas about China, and the latter considered several different kingdoms or countries as having been conquered and brought under the control of the Mongols. But similar to the development in Mongol Iran, native intellectuals interested in their own history interpreted the unification by the Mongols as a revival of their dynastic tradition, and the concept of Zhongguo was considered an important ideology and was further developed by the subsequent Ming dynasty. The revival of the concept of territorial unity, although not intended by the Mongols, became a lasting legacy of Mongol rule in China (and Iran).

Qing emperors referred to all subjects of the Qing dynasty regardless of their ethnicity as "Chinese" (中國之人), and used the term "Zhongguo" as a synonym for the entire Qing Empire while using "neidi" (内地; "inner regions") to refer only to the core area (or China proper) of the empire. The Qing Empire was viewed as a single multi-ethnic entity.

The Qing emperors governed frontier non-Han areas in a separate administrative system under the Lifan Yuan. Nonetheless, it was the Qing emperors who expanded the definition of Zhongguo and made it "flexible" by using that term to refer to the entire empire. Zhongguo was also used by the Qing Empire as an endonym in diplomatic correspondence. However, some Han subjects criticized their usage of the term and used Zhongguo only to refer to the seventeen provinces of China and three provinces of the east (Manchuria), excluding other frontier areas. Han literati who remained loyal to the Ming dynasty held to defining the old Ming borders as "China" and used the term "foreigner" to describe ethnic minorities under Qing rule, such as the Mongols, as part of their anti-Qing ideology. As the territorial borders of the Qing Empire were fixed through a series of treaties with neighboring foreign powers, it was able to inculcate in the Qing subjects a sense that China included areas such as Mongolia and Tibet due to educational reforms. Specifically, the educational reform made it clear where the borders of the Qing Empire were, even if Han subjects did not understand how the Chinese identity included Mongols and Tibetans or understand what the connotations of being "Chinese" were.

In an attempt to portray different ethnicities as part of one family ruled by the Qing dynasty, the phrase "Zhongwai yijia" (中外一家; "interior and exterior as one family") was used to convey the idea of the "unification" of different ethnic groups. After conquering China proper, the Manchus identified their state as "China" (中國; Zhōngguó; "Middle Kingdom"), and referred to it as "Dulimbai Gurun" in the Manchu language (Dulimbai means "central" or "middle", while gurun means "nation" or "state"). The emperors labelled the lands of the Qing Empire (including present-day Northeast China, Xinjiang, Mongolia, Tibet, and other areas) as "China" in both the Chinese and Manchu languages. This effectively defined China as a multi-ethnic state, thereby rejecting the idea that "China" only meant Han-populated areas. The Qing emperors proclaimed that both Han and non-Han ethnic groups were part of "China". They also used both "China" and "Qing" to refer to their state in official documents, international treaties (the Qing Empire was known internationally as "China" or the "Chinese Empire"), and foreign affairs. The "Chinese language" (Dulimbai gurun i bithe) included Chinese, Manchu, Mongol, and Tibetan languages, while the "Chinese people" (中國之人; Zhōngguó zhī rén; Manchu: Dulimbai gurun i niyalma) referred to all subjects of the Qing Empire.

In the 1689 Treaty of Nerchinsk, the term "China" (Dulimbai Gurun; Zhongguo) was used to refer to the Qing territories in Manchuria in both the Manchu and Chinese language versions of the treaty. Additionally, the term "the wise Emperor of China" was also used in the Manchu version of the treaty.

The Qianlong Emperor rejected the earlier idea that only the Han people could be subjects of China and only Han lands could be considered as part of China. Instead, he redefined China as being multi-ethnic, saying in 1755 that "there exists a view of China (Zhongxia; 中夏), according to which non-Han peoples cannot become China's subjects and their lands cannot be integrated into the territory of China. This does not represent our dynasty's understanding of China, but is instead a view of the earlier Han, Tang, Song, and Ming dynasties." The Qianlong Emperor rejected the views of ethnic Han officials who claimed that Xinjiang was not part of China and that he should not annex it, putting forth the argument that China was multi-ethnic and did not just refer to Han areas.

When the Qing conquered Dzungaria, they proclaimed that the new land which formerly belonged to the Oirat-led Dzungar Khanate was now absorbed into China (Dulimbai Gurun) in a Manchu language memorial.

The Yongzheng Emperor spoke out against the claim by anti-Qing rebels that the Qing dynasty were only the rulers of the Manchus and not of China, saying "The seditious rebels claim that we are the rulers of Manchus and only later penetrated central China to become its rulers. Their prejudices concerning the division of their and our country have caused many vitriolic falsehoods. What these rebels have not understood is the fact that it is for the Manchus the same as the birthplace is for the people of the Central Plain. Shun belonged to the Eastern Yi, and King Wen to the Western Yi. Does this fact diminish their virtues?"

According to scholar Sergius L. Kuzmin of the Russian Academy of Sciences, despite the Qing dynasty's usage of the term "China", these empires were known officially by their respective dynastic name. Non-Han peoples considered themselves as subjects of the Yuan and Qing empires and did not necessarily equate them to "China". This resulted from different ways of the Yuan and Qing legitimization for different peoples in these empires. Qing emperors were referred to as "Khagan of China" (or "Chinese khagan") by their Turkic Muslim subjects (now known as the Uyghurs), as "Bogda Khan" or "(Manchu) Emperor" by their Mongol subjects, and as "Emperor of China" (or "Chinese Emperor") and "the Great Emperor" (or "Great Emperor Manjushri") by their Tibetan subjects, such as in the 1856 Treaty of Thapathali. It is pointed out that Tibetan subjects regarded the Qing as Chinese, unlike the Yuan which was founded by Mongols. According to Kuzmin, the Liao, Jin, Yuan and Qing were multi-national empires led by non-Chinese peoples to whom the conquered China or its part was joined. Nevertheless, American historian Richard J. Smith points out "China proper" (often designated 内地 meaning "inner territory" in Chinese) refers to the core eighteenth provinces of the Qing dynasty, but from a Manchu perspective, however, the concept of “China” (Chinese: Zhongguo; Manchu: Dulimbai Gurun) embraced the entire empire, including Manchuria, Mongolia, Xinjiang, and Tibet.

The modern territorial claims of both the People's Republic of China, based in Beijing, and the Republic of China, based in Taipei, are derived from the territories that were held by the Qing dynasty at the time of its demise. The nationalistic concept of the Zhonghua minzu (Chinese nation) also traces its roots to the multiethnic and multicultural nature of the Qing Empire.

== Related ==
=== Alternative views ===
Former history professor Hugh R. Clark presents another view on the subject. In his formulation, Chineseness centered around the culture of the Central Plain built up over time. Each major Chinese dynasty represented the frontier of what was Sinitic, beyond which was considered uncivilized. When a new dynasty gained control of the Central Plain, elements of an outside culture would be added to what had come before. In this way, most Chinese dynasties, not just the Yuan and the Qing, can be regarded as conquest dynasties, even traditionally Sinitic ones such as the Zhou and the Qin.

=== CCP rejection of the concept ===
The History of Qing is an academic project initiated by the late historian Dai Yi and sponsored by the State Council of the People's Republic of China since 2002 for an official history of the Qing dynasty, as a revision of the 1928 Draft History of Qing. In November 2023, Taisu Zhang of Yale Law School stated that he had learnt the work eventually failed to pass political review. Following the review failure, the authorities requested scholars working on the project to make changes to the tome to better align with the vision of Xi Jinping, the general secretary of the Chinese Communist Party. According to historian Pamela Kyle Crossley, the CCP under Xi has rejected the concept of "conquest dynasties" due to concern that it could encourage separatist sentiments in Tibet, Xinjiang and Inner Mongolia as well as advance calls for Taiwanese independence. Crossley further stated that "[a]ccording to Xi Jinping, there have been no conquests in Chinese history. Only happy unifications with people aspiring to be Chinese."

== List of non-Han dynasties ==
This list includes only the major dynasties of China ruled by non-Han ethnicities, there were many other such dynastic regimes that ruled an area historically or currently associated with "China" not shown in this list. Also, not all non-Han regimes are seen as conquest dynasties, and many of them are considered "infiltration dynasties" by Karl August Wittfogel.

| Ethnicity | Conquest dynasty | Period of rule | Territorial extent |
|---|---|---|---|
| Xianbei 鮮卑 | Tuyuhun 吐谷渾 | 284–670 CE | Parts of China proper |
| Xianbei 鮮卑 | Former Yan 前燕 | 337–370 CE | Parts of China proper |
| Xianbei 鮮卑 | Later Yan 後燕 | 384–409 CE | Parts of China proper |
| Xianbei 鮮卑 | Western Qin 西秦 | 385–400 CE, 409–431 CE | Parts of China proper |
| Xianbei 鮮卑 | Southern Liang 南涼 | 397–414 CE | Parts of China proper |
| Xianbei 鮮卑 | Southern Yan 南燕 | 398–410 CE | Parts of China proper |
| Xianbei 鮮卑 | Dai 代 | 310–376 CE | Parts of China proper |
| Xianbei 鮮卑 | Duan Qi 段齊 | 350–356 CE | Parts of China proper |
| Xianbei 鮮卑 | Western Yan 西燕 | 384–394 CE | Parts of China proper |
| Xianbei 鮮卑 | Northern Wei 北魏 | 386–535 CE | Parts of China proper |
| Xianbei 鮮卑 | Eastern Wei 東魏 | 534–550 CE | Parts of China proper |
| Xianbei 鮮卑 | Western Wei 西魏 | 535–557 CE | Parts of China proper |
| Xianbei 鮮卑 | Northern Zhou 北周 | 557–581 CE | Parts of China proper |
| Di 氐 | Chouchi 仇池 | 296–371 CE, 385–443 CE | Parts of China proper |
| Di 氐 | Cheng-Han 成漢 | 304–347 CE | Parts of China proper |
| Di 氐 | Former Qin 前秦 | 351–394 CE | Parts of China proper |
| Di 氐 | Later Liang 後涼 | 386–403 CE | Parts of China proper |
| Xiongnu 匈奴 | Han-Zhao 漢趙 | 304–329 CE | Parts of China proper |
| Xiongnu 匈奴 | Northern Liang 北涼 | 397–439 CE | Parts of China proper |
| Xiongnu 匈奴 | Hu Xia 胡夏 | 407–431 CE | Parts of China proper |
| Xiongnu 匈奴 | Xu 許 | 618–619 CE | Parts of China proper |
| Jie 羯 | Later Zhao 後趙 | 319–351 CE | Parts of China proper |
| Jie 羯 | Hou Han 侯漢 | 551–552 CE | Parts of China proper |
| Qiang 羌 | Later Qin 後秦 | 384–417 CE | Parts of China proper |
| Dingling 丁零 | Zhai Wei 翟魏 | 388–392 CE | Parts of China proper |
| Sogdian 粟特 | Former Yan 前燕 | 756–759 CE | Parts of China proper |
| Göktürk 突厥 | Later Yan 後燕 | 759–763 CE | Parts of China proper |
| Shatuo 沙陀 | Former Jin 前晉 | 907–923 CE | Parts of China proper |
| Shatuo 沙陀 | Later Tang 後唐 | 923–937 CE | Parts of China proper |
| Shatuo 沙陀 | Later Jin 後晉 | 936–947 CE | Parts of China proper |
| Shatuo 沙陀 | Later Han 後漢 | 947–951 CE | Parts of China proper |
| Shatuo 沙陀 | Northern Han 北漢 | 951–979 CE | Parts of China proper |
| Khitan 契丹 | Liao dynasty 遼朝 | 916–1125 CE | Parts of China proper |
| Khitan 契丹 | Dongdan 東丹 | 926–936 CE | Parts of China proper |
| Khitan 契丹 | Northern Liao 北遼 | 1122–1123 CE | Parts of China proper |
| Khitan 契丹 | Western Liao 西遼 | 1124–1218 CE | Parts of China proper |
| Khitan 契丹 | Eastern Liao 東遼 | 1213–1269 CE | Parts of China proper |
| Khitan 契丹 | Later Liao 後遼 | 1216–1219 CE | Parts of China proper |
| Baiman 白蠻 | Dali 大理 | 937–1094 CE, 1096–1253 CE | Parts of China proper |
| Baiman 白蠻 | Dazhong 大中 | 1094–1096 CE | Parts of China proper |
| Tangut 党項 | Western Xia 西夏 | 1038–1227 CE | Parts of China proper |
| Tangut 党項 | Shun dynasty 順朝 | 1644–1646 CE | Parts of China proper |
| Jurchen 女真 | Jin dynasty 金朝 | 1115–1234 CE | Parts of China proper |
| Jurchen 女真 | Eastern Xia 東夏 | 1215–1233 CE | Parts of China proper |
| Jurchen 女真 | Later Jin 後金 | 1616–1636 CE | Parts of China proper |
| Mongol 蒙古 | Yuan dynasty 元朝 | 1271–1368 CE | All of China proper |
| Mongol 蒙古 | Northern Yuan 北元 | 1368–1635 CE | Parts of China proper |
| Manchu 滿洲 | Qing dynasty 清朝 | 1644–1912 CE | All of China proper |

== See also ==
- Mongol Empire
- Yuan dynasty in Inner Asia
- Qing dynasty in Inner Asia
- Ethnic groups in Chinese history
- New Qing History
- Northern and Southern dynasties
- List of emperors of the Northern dynasties
- Tatar yoke
- Dynastic cycle
- Dynasties of China
- Sinicization
- De-Sinicization
- Sinocentrism
- Chinese historiography
- Mandate of Heaven
- Zhonghua minzu
- Hua–Yi distinction
- Civilization state
- Debate on the Chineseness of the Yuan and Qing dynasties
- History of Liao
- History of Jin
- History of Yuan
- Little China (ideology)
