= Joseph R. Levenson =

American historian (1920–1969)

Joseph Richmond Levenson
- Born: June 10, 1920; Boston, Massachusetts, U.S.
- Died: April 6, 1969 (aged 48); Russian River, California, U.S.
- Education: Harvard University (1949)
- Spouse: Rosemary Sebag-Montefiore
- Children: Richard Levenson; Irene Levenson; Thomas Levenson; Leo Levenson
- Scientific career
- Fields: Intellectual History of China
- Doctoral advisor: John King Fairbank
- Notable students: Frederic E. Wakeman

Joseph Richmond Levenson (June 10, 1920 – April 6, 1969) was a scholar of Chinese history and Jane K. Sather Professor of History at the University of California, Berkeley.

After graduating from Boston Latin School in 1937 and Harvard College in 1941, Levenson enlisted in the United States Navy in 1942. He attended Japanese Language School and saw active service in the Solomon Islands and Philippines campaigns. After the war he earned M.A. (1947) and PhD (1949) degrees at Harvard, where he was a student of John K. Fairbank. He was a member of the Harvard Society of Fellows. He taught at the University of California, Berkeley, from 1951 until his death. He drowned in a canoeing accident in the Russian River, California, in 1969.

== Honors and awards ==
Levenson earned a number of awards and prizes, including Fulbright (1954–55), the Center for Advanced Study in the Behavioral Sciences (1958–59); Guggenheim (1962–63); and the American Council of Learned Societies (1966–67).

In honor of his scholarly and pedagogical contributions, two awards are made in his name: the China and Inner Asia Council of the Association for Asian Studies offers the Joseph Levenson Book Prize and one by Harvard University for excellence in undergraduate teaching.

== Intellectual achievements ==
Paul Cohen commented in his study of American historical writing on China, Discovering History in China, that Levenson addressed "the issues of modernization and cultural change more persistently, imaginatively, and, for many of his readers, persuasively than perhaps any other American historian of China in the immediate postwar decades".

== References and further reading ==
- Brooks, E. Bruce (2003). "History without Philology (Review) Joseph Levenson and Franz Schurmann. China: An Interpretive History". Warring States Project. University of Massachusetts, Amherst.
- James Cahill, "Joseph Levenson's Role In My Development As A Scholar And Writer."
- Paul Cohen, Joseph Levenson and the Historiography of the 1950s and 1960s, in —— (2010). Discovering History in China : American Historical Writing on the Recent Chinese Past. New York: Columbia University Press.
- Dong, Madeleine Yue; Zhang, Ping (2014). "Joseph Levenson and the Possibility for a Dialogic History". Journal of Modern Chinese History. 8 (1): 1–24. doi:10.1080/17535654.2014.899037. S2CID 145504770.
- Harrison, John A. (2011). "Joseph Richmond Levenson 1920–1969". The Journal of Asian Studies. 29 (1): 5. doi:10.1017/S0021911800087192.
- Hummel, Sr., Arthur W. (2011). "(Review) Liang Ch'i-Ch'ao and the Mind of Modern China. By Joseph R. Levenson, Harvard University Press, Cambridge, Mass., 1953, Xii, 256 $4.00". The Far Eastern Quarterly. 14 (1): 110–112. doi:10.2307/2942250. hdl:2027/mdp.39015002651159. JSTOR 2942250.
- Levenson, Thomas M. (April 6, 1979), "Joseph R. Levenson: A Retrospective", The Harvard Crimson
- Henry F. May, H. Franz Schurmann, Frederic Wakeman, "Joseph Richmond Levenson, History, Berkeley," (Necrology) Calisphere University of California.
- Meisner, Maurice J.; Rhoads Murphey (1976). The Mozartian Historian: Essays on the Works of Joseph R. Levenson. Berkeley: University of California Press. ISBN 0520028260.
- Don J. Wyatt, Joseph Richmond Levenson, International Directory of Intellectual Historians.

== Selected works ==
=== Articles and chapters ===
- "The Humanistic Disciplines: Will Sinology Do?," The Journal of Asian Studies 23.04 (1964): 507–512.

=== Books ===
- Liang Ch'i-ch'ao and the Mind of Modern China (1953)
- Confucian China and Its Modern Fate (1958–1965)
- China: an interpretive history, from the beginnings to the fall of Han (1969)
- Revolution and Cosmopolitanism: the Western stage and the Chinese stages (1971)
