= Alice L. Miller =

Dr. Alice Lyman Miller (born Harold Lyman Miller, 1944) is a researcher, writer, and professor known for her analysis of Chinese history, politics, and foreign policy. She completed her gender transition in 2006.

== Career ==
Born and raised in upstate New York, Miller then attended Princeton University and received a PhD from George Washington University in 1974 with a doctoral dissertation on Qing dynasty politics. She worked as an analyst at Central Intelligence Agency, from 1974 to 1990. From 1980 to 2000, she taught at Johns Hopkins SAIS in Washington, D.C., first as a lecturer and then as associate professor of China studies and director of the China Studies Program. Miller was a professor of National Security Affairs at the Naval Postgraduate School from 1999 to 2014. She has been a research fellow at the Hoover Institution and a lecturer in East Asian Studies at Stanford University since 1999.

From 2001 to 2018, Miller was also the general editor of China Leadership Monitor, a quarterly journal providing open-source analysis of the internal workings of the Chinese Communist Party.

== Personal life ==
In 2002, she began a series of treatments for gender transition and began using the name Alice Lyman Miller. She said her professional community and family were supportive of her transition. She has made extensive public comments about this transition, including at TEDxStanford in 2015.

== Works ==
- Harold Lyman Miller. Factional Conflict and the Integration of Ch'ing Politics, 1661-1690. Phd thesis, George Washington University,1974.
- H. Lyman Miller. Science and Dissent in Post-Mao China: The Politics of Knowledge. University of Washington Press, 1996.
- Miller, H. Lyman (2000), "Late Imperial Chinese Slate", in Shambaugh, David L. (ed.), The Modern Chinese State, New York: Cambridge University Press, pp. 14–41, ISBN 978-0521772341
- The CCP Central Committee's Leading Small Groups (2008)
- The Central Departments under Hu Jintao (2009)
- Miller, Alice Lyman (2009). "Some Things We Used to Know About China's Past and Present (but Now, Not So Much)". Journal of American-East Asian Relations. 16 (1–2): 41–68. doi:10.1163/187656109793645724.
- Becoming Asia: Change and Continuity in Asian International Relations Since World War II with Richard Wich (2011)

== See also ==
- Superpower
