= Frederic Wakeman =

American historian (1937–2006)

Frederic Evans Wakeman Jr.
- Born: December 12, 1937; Kansas City, Kansas, U.S.
- Died: September 14, 2006 (aged 68); Lake Oswego, Oregon, U.S.
- Citizenship: American
- Education: Harvard University; University of California, Berkeley
- Scientific career
- Fields: East Asia
- Workplaces: University of California, Berkeley
- Doctoral advisor: Joseph Levenson
- Notable students: Mark Elliott, Joseph Esherick, Madeleine Zelin, Jeffrey Wasserstrom, Orville Schell

Frederic Evans Wakeman Jr. (Chinese: 魏斐德; pinyin: Wèi Fěidé; December 12, 1937 – September 14, 2006) was an American scholar of East Asian history and professor of history at University of California, Berkeley. He served as president of the American Historical Association and of the Social Science Research Council. Jonathan D. Spence said of Wakeman that he was an evocative writer who chose, "like the novelist he really wanted to be, stories that split into different currents and swept the reader along", adding that he was "quite simply the best modern Chinese historian of the last 30 years".

== Biography ==
Wakeman was born in Kansas City, Kansas, the son of best-selling novelist Frederic E. Wakeman Sr. (publishing as "Frederic Wakeman"), who often moved the family to live abroad in places like Bermuda, France, and Cuba. In the 1940s and 1950s, the family lived at 433 Isle of Palms in Fort Lauderdale, Florida. He graduated from Harvard University in 1959, where he majored in European history and literature. After Harvard, he went on to earn master's degrees from the University of Cambridge and at the Institut d'études politiques in Paris. While studying at the Institut d'études politiques, he switched to Chinese studies. In 1962 he published a novel, Seventeen Royal Palms Drive, under the name "Evans Wakeman". Wakeman received his Ph.D. in Far Eastern history at University of California, Berkeley, in 1965, under the supervision of Professor Joseph Levenson. That year he began teaching at Berkeley, where he remained his entire career and retired as the Walter and Elise Haas Professor of Asian Studies. Wakeman served as the director of the Institute of East Asian Studies at Berkeley from 1990 to 2001. Upon his retirement from Berkeley in May 2006, he received the "Berkeley Citation", the highest honor given at the university. His step-mother was Greek actress Ellie Lambeti, who married Wakeman Sr. in 1959.

== Academic career ==
Starting in the early 1970s, Wakeman chaired academic committees formed to expand cultural and scholastic relations with China. In 1987, he helped draft an appeal signed by 160 American scholars calling on the Chinese government to stop oppressing intellectuals. Wakeman served as president of American Historical Association in 1992 and the president of the Social Science Research Council from 1986 to 1989. He was a member of both the American Academy of Arts and Sciences and the American Philosophical Society.

He was the author of ten books, seven published by the University of California Press. His first monograph, published in 1966 and based on his doctoral dissertation, was Strangers at the Gate: Social Disorder in South China, 1839–1861. Strangers at the Gate focused on social disorder in the Pearl River Delta in the aftermath of the First Opium War and extensively utilized documents seized by the British from the Guangdong-Guangxi Governor-General's office. He contributed the essay "High Ch'ing: 1683–1839" to the anthology edited by James B. Crowley, Modern East Asia: Essays in Interpretation (New York: Harcourt: 1970). With History and Will: Philosophical Perspectives of Mao Tse-Tung's Thought in 1973 he turned to philosophical and contemporary themes, and in 1975 returned to Qing dynasty China in The Fall of Imperial China. The most extensive and voluminous of Wakeman's works on the Qing is the two volume The Great Enterprise: The Manchu Reconstruction of Imperial Order in the 17th Century (1985), which won the Joseph Levenson Book Prize for 1987.

Organizing conferences and publishing conference volumes was also a major activity, for instance: Conflict and Control in Late Imperial China (1975), Shanghai Sojourners. (1992), and Reappraising Republican China (2000).

In the mid-1970s Wakeman began to focus on the history of Shanghai. Best known of these works are the Spymaster: Dai Li and the Chinese Secret Service, and his "Shanghai Trilogy": Policing Shanghai, 1927–1937; Shanghai Badlands, 1937–1942, and The Red Star Over Shanghai, 1942–1952 (posthumously published in Chinese). These works encompassed the city's history under the various regimes since the formation of the city, that is, the Nationalist government, Wang Jingwei's puppet regime, and the communist takeover.

Wakeman retired from teaching in May 2006. He died later that year in Lake Oswego, Oregon, of liver cancer at the age of 68.

== Selected major publications ==
- Strangers at the Gate; Social Disorder in South China, 1839–1861. (Berkeley,: University of California Press, 1966).
- ed., "Nothing Concealed": Essays in Honor of Liu Yü-Yün (Taipei: Ch'engwen ch'u pan she: distributed by Chinese Materials and Research Aids Service Center, 1970).
- History and Will; Philosophical Perspective of Mao Tse-Tung's Thought. (Berkeley,: University of California Press, 1973). ISBN 978-0-520-02104-4.
- The Fall of Imperial China. (New York: Free Press, The Transformation of Modern China Series, 1975). ISBN 978-0-02-933690-8.
- with Carolyn Grant, eds., Conflict and Control in Late Imperial China. (Berkeley: University of California Press, 1975). ISBN 978-0-520-02597-4.
- with U.S. Delegation of Ming and Qing Historians, Ming and Qing Historical Studies in the People's Republic of China. (Berkeley, CA: Institute of East Asian Studies, University of California, Berkeley, Center for Chinese Studies, China Research, 1980). ISBN 978-0-912966-27-4.
- The Great Enterprise: The Manchu Reconstruction of Imperial Order in Seventeenth-Century China. (Berkeley: University of California Press, 1985). 2 vols. ISBN 978-0-520-04804-1 (set).
- with Wen-Hsin Yeh, eds., Shanghai Sojourners. (Berkeley: Institute of East Asian Studies Center for Chinese Studies, China Research Monograph, 1992). ISBN 978-1-55729-035-9.
- Policing Shanghai, 1927–1937. (Berkeley: University of California Press, 1995). ISBN 978-0-520-08488-9.
- The Shanghai Badlands: Wartime Terrorism and Urban Crime, 1937–1941. (Cambridge England; New York: Cambridge University Press, Cambridge Studies in Chinese History, Literature, and Institutions, 1996). ISBN 978-0-521-49744-2. Sample Pages
- Strangers at the Gate: Social Disorder in South China, 1839–1861. (Berkeley: University of California Press, 2nd paperback printing, 1997). ISBN 978-0-520-21239-8.
- with Suzhen Chen. Hong Ye: Qing Chao Kai Guo Shi. (Nanjing: Jiangsu ren min chu ban she, "Hai Wai Zhongguo Yan Jiu" Cong Shu Di 1 ban., 1998). ISBN 978-7-214-00923-4.
- with Sh Sandag, Harry H. Kendall. Poisoned Arrows: The Stalin-Choibalsan Mongolian Massacres, 1921–1941. (Boulder, CO: Westview Press, 2000). ISBN 978-0-8133-3710-4.
- with Richard L. Edmonds, ed., Reappraising Republican China. (Oxford; New York: Oxford University Press, Studies on Contemporary China, 2000). ISBN 978-0-19-829617-1.
- Spymaster : Dai Li and the Chinese Secret Service. (Berkeley: University of California Press, 2003). ISBN 978-0-520-23407-9.
- Telling Chinese History : A Selection of Essays. Berkeley: University of California Press. 2009. ISBN 978-0-520-25605-7.; translated as 讲述中国历史 ((Jiǎngshù Zhōngguó lìshǐ) Beijing 2008), translated by 梁禾 (Liang He).
