= Foster Rhea Dulles =

American journalist (1900–1970)

Foster Rhea Dulles (24 January 1900, Englewood, New Jersey – 11 September 1970, Jamaica, Vermont) was an American journalist, historian, and author. He specialized in political and cultural relations between the United States and East Asia, and advocated internationalism as opposed to American isolationism. The diplomats John Foster Dulles and Allen Dulles were his cousins.

== Biography ==
After secondary education at The Hill School in Pottstown, Pennsylvania, Dulles attended Princeton University, where he graduated with a bachelor's degree in 1921. For two years after graduation he lived in China and taught at Princeton University's Peking Center (Princeton-in-Peking). In 1922 he became a correspondent in Beijing for the Christian Science Monitor. He returned to the United States, and in 1923 he joined the staff of the New York Herald. In 1924 he joined the staff of Foreign Affairs. From 1925 to 1926 he worked at the Paris bureau of the New York Herald Tribune. From 1927 to 1933 he wrote editorials for the New York Evening Post.

Dulles was a Guggenheim Fellow for the academic year 1937–1938. He was a visiting professor of American history at Bennington College for the academic year 1938–1940, at Smith College for the academic year 1939–1940 and at Swarthmore College for the academic year 1940‐1941. He received his PhD from Columbia University in 1940 after submitting his thesis, America Learns to Learn.

Dulles was a professor of history at Ohio State University from 1941 to 1965, when he retired as professor emeritus. He was chair of the history department from 1953 to 1958.

In 1957, he went on State Department cultural exchanges to India, where he lectured at several different universities, and to the Soviet Union in 1958. He was a Fulbright lecturer in Japan for the academic year 1961‐1962.

Dulles Hall at Ohio State University was built in 1975 and named in his memory.

== Family ==
Foster R. Dulles's father was William Dulles (1857–1915), who was a lawyer and corporation president, and an uncle of Allen Dulles and John Foster Dulles.

On August 7, 1926, Foster R. Dulles married Marion Richardson in Bound Brook, New Jersey.

Upon his death in 1970 he was survived by his widow, four daughters, and eight grandchildren.

== Selected publications ==
- Old China Trade. Boston and New York: Houghton Mifflin company. 1930.
- Eastward Ho!: The First English Adventures to the Orient: Richard Chancellor, Anthony Jenkinson, James Lancaster, William Adams, Sir Thomas Roe. Boston and New York: Houghton Mifflin Company. 1931; 199 pages
- America in the Pacific: A Century of Expansion. Boston: Houghton Mifflin. 1932.
- Lowered Boats: A Chronicle of American Whaling. New York: Harcourt, Brace and company. 1933.
- Harpoon: The Story of a Whaling Voyage. Boston & New York: Houghton Mifflin Company. 1935; illustrations by Clifford W. Ashley
- Forty Years of American-Japanese Relations. New York & London: D. Appleton-Century Company. 1937.
- America Learns to Play: A History of Popular Recreation, 1607–1940. New York & London: D. Appleton-Century Company. 1940.
- Behind the Open Door: The Story of American Far Eastern Relations. 1944.
- Road to Teheran: The Story of Russia and America, 1781-1943. Princeton, N.J.: Princeton University Press. 1944.
  - Chemin de Téhéran, la Russie et l'Amérique de 1871-1943. New York. 1945.
  - Weg nach Teheran, eine Darstellung der russisch-amerikanischen Beziehungen von 1781-1943. New York. 1945.
- Twentieth-Century America. Boston & New York: Published for Reynal and Hitchcock by Houghton Mifflin Company. 1945.
- China and America: The Story of Their Relations Since 1784. Princeton, N.J.: Princeton University Press. 1946. (later editions co-authored by Melvyn Dubofsky)
- Russia and America: Pacific Neighbors. New York & San Francisco: American council, Institute of Pacific Relations. 1946.
- Labor in America: A History. New York: T. Y. Crowell Co. 1949.
- The American Red Cross: A History. New York, Harper. 1950.
- America's Rise to World Power, 1898-1954. New York: Harper. 1955.
- The Imperial Years: America's Brief Moment of Imperial Fervor. New York: Crowell. 1956.
- The United States Since 1865. Ann Arbor: University of Michigan Press. 1959; 562 pages
- Americans Abroad: Two Centuries of European Travel. Ann Arbor: University of Michigan Press. 1964.
- Prelude to World Power: American Diplomatic History, 1860-1900. New York: Macmillan. 1965.
- Yankees and Samurai: America's Role in the Emergence of Modern Japan 1791-1900. New York: Harper & Row. 1965.
- The Civil Rights Commission, 1957-1965. East Lansing: Michigan State University Press. 1968.
- American Policy Toward Communist China, 1949-1969. New York: Crowell. 1972; Foreword by John K. Fairbank
