= Knight Biggerstaff =

American historian of China

Knight Biggerstaff (Chinese: 毕乃德; 1906–2001) was an American historian of China.

== Education ==
Biggerstaff was born in Berkeley, California and graduated from the University of California, Berkeley in 1927. He received his Ph.D. from Harvard University in 1934. He was the first Harvard-Yenching Fellow to study at Yenching University in Beijing, and later a Fulbright Scholar, a Rockefeller Foundation Fellow and a Guggenheim Fellow.

== Career ==
Biggerstaff served the U.S. State Department as a China expert during World War II, becoming the Chinese language secretary at the U.S. embassy in Chongqing. In 1946, he assisted ultimately unsuccessful U.S. efforts to construct a peace plan to avert the Chinese Civil War.

In the 1950s, in part because of his status as an expert on China, he was branded a communist sympathizer by Senator Joseph McCarthy, an accusation which took years to fight off - a feat at which he was ultimately successful.

Much of his academic career was spent at Cornell University, where he chaired the Department of Asian Studies from 1946 to 1956, helping to create the university's China (now East Asia) and Southeast Asia programs. He also chaired Cornell's history department from 1956 to 1963. Biggerstaff also helped to launch a quarterly journal, now The Journal of Asian Studies.
