= Rhoads Murphey =

W. Rhoads Murphey (August 13, 1919 Philadelphia, Pennsylvania − December 20, 2012 Ann Arbor, Michigan) was a geographer and historian of Asia who taught at University of Washington, Seattle, and University of Michigan, Ann Arbor. He served for many years as executive director of the Association for Asian Studies, and in 1987-88 as its president. He was editor of the Journal of Asian Studies.

The University of Michigan in 1974 gave Murphey its highest honor, the Distinguished Service Award. Murphey also accepted Association of American Geographers Honors in 1980. In 1966 he was a Guggenheim Fellow.

== Education and career ==
Murphey earned his A.B. degree magna cum laude in history in 1941 and his M.A. degree in history from Harvard University in 1942. Although not a Quaker, Murphey attended a Friends School in his hometown of Philadelphia. That environment shaped his belief that “killing wouldn't solve anything.” He resolved, however, to assist against the threat of the Axis powers. He enlisted as a conscientious objector and served with the British Friends Ambulance Unit in China from 1942 to 1946. In the ambulance unit, Murphey and an international group of men drove old, charcoal-powered Chevrolet trucks throughout southwest China with medical supplies.

Following the war, Murphey received an M.A. degree in international and regional studies in 1948 and his Ph.D. degree in Far Eastern history and geography from Harvard University in 1950, where he studied with John K. Fairbank. Murphey taught Asian studies and geography at the University of Washington from 1952–1964. In 1964, he went to University of Michigan as professor of Asian studies and geography. His title was changed to professor of history in 1982.

Professor Murphey wrote or co-authored a dozen books on the history and geography of China and South Asia. He focused on the modern history of urbanization in the region through such works as Shanghai: Key to Modem China (1953). The Outsiders: Westerners in India and China (1977) won an award for best book of the year by the University of Michigan Press. His several textbooks on the history of Asia went through many editions; A History of Asia appeared in its 7th edition in 2016.

== Memories of wartime China ==
As a driver for the British Ambulance Corps in China during the Second Sino-Japanese War, Murphey traveled to Kunming, Chongqing, Yan'an, Hanoi, Hong Kong and Shanghai and met Chiang Kai-shek and Mao Zedong. Hong Kong was just an “outpost of colonialism,” Murphey recalled, and nothing like the huge metropolis that it became in post-war history. Murphy told a later interviewer his wartime encounters with Zhou Enlai, who was a “charmer”:

He was a delightful guy... Well, there was no real language barrier because his French was excellent and most of us knew French...and we were quite at home with Chinese so we would talk both languages with him...and he used to have "open house" in [Chongqing]...he lived in [Chongqing] for much of the war because he was the go-between...he was a diplomat...
He had a fourth floor walk up "cold water" flat...in the back of one of those buildings in [Chongqing]...and we used to go up there for tea and peanuts, and whatnot, on Thursday afternoons...when he was in town. He was great...just great. I know why we used to go! ...not just because he was great, but because we had already been planning to send medical supplies up to them, which we knew they desperately needed... But, we had been prevented from doing so by the stupid Kuomintang, and so, we finally "sicked" the Americans, the American Embassy, on them... To make them, grudgingly, agree to let us go up there...

When his unit reached Yan'an, the communist wartime capital, their impression of the communists was more favorable than of the Nationalists:

Oh sure! They [the Communist leaders] all turned out! That was one of the differences between that side and the Kuomintang side...when we arrived there, the whole gang showed up...and they gave a feast for us one night and Chou En-lai (Zhou Enlai), who was a "charmer," a wonderful man and Chu Teh (Zhu De) and even Mao showed up, at this party, and then we had a big celebration afterwards and all that good stuff...

Murphy recalled that he came away with a positive impression, but added:

Oh, totally! ...totally...and in those days we, like everybody else, I guess I could say that we were naive, but then so was everybody else, ah, in, ah, taking the Communists at face value...on the basis of what they had done up to that point...which was pretty good, pretty positive. We had no notion of what a nightmare they were going to create.

== Selected publications ==
- —— (1953). Shanghai, Key to Modern China. Cambridge: Harvard University Press. online
- —— (1961). An Introduction to Geography. Chicago: Rand McNally. also 1966
- —— (1967). Approaches to Modern Chinese History. with Feuerwerker, Albert, Mary Wright, eds. Berkeley: University of California Press.
- —— (1970). The Treaty Ports and China's Modernization: What Went Wrong?. Ann Arbor, Mich.: U of Michigan, Center for Chinese Studies.
- —— (1974), Elvin, Mark and G. William Skinner (ed.), Treaty Ports and China's Modernization, Stanford: Stanford University Press
- ——; Meisner, Maurice J. (1976). The Mozartian Historian: Essays on the Works of Joseph R. Levenson. Berkeley: U of California Press. ISBN 978-0-520-02826-5.
- —— (1977). The Outsiders: The Western Experience in India and China. Ann Arbor: U of Michigan Press. ISBN 978-0-472-08679-5.
- —— (1980). The Fading of the Maoist Vision: City and Country in China's Development. New York: Methuen. ISBN 978-0-416-60201-2.
- —— (1982). The Scope of Geography. New York: Methuen. ISBN 978-0-416-33410-4.
- —— (1992). A History of Asia. New York, NY: HarperCollins. ISBN 978-0-06-044663-5.. 37 editions published between 1992 and 2015. online 2006 edition
- —— (1994). Fifty Years of China to Me: Personal Recollections of 1942–1992. Ann Arbor, Mich.: Association for Asian Studies. ISBN 978-0-924304-17-0.
- —— (2004). East Asia: A New History. New York: Pearson/Longman. ISBN 978-0-321-16336-3. 19 editions published between 1996 and 2010. online
