= John King Fairbank =

American sinologist (1907–1991)

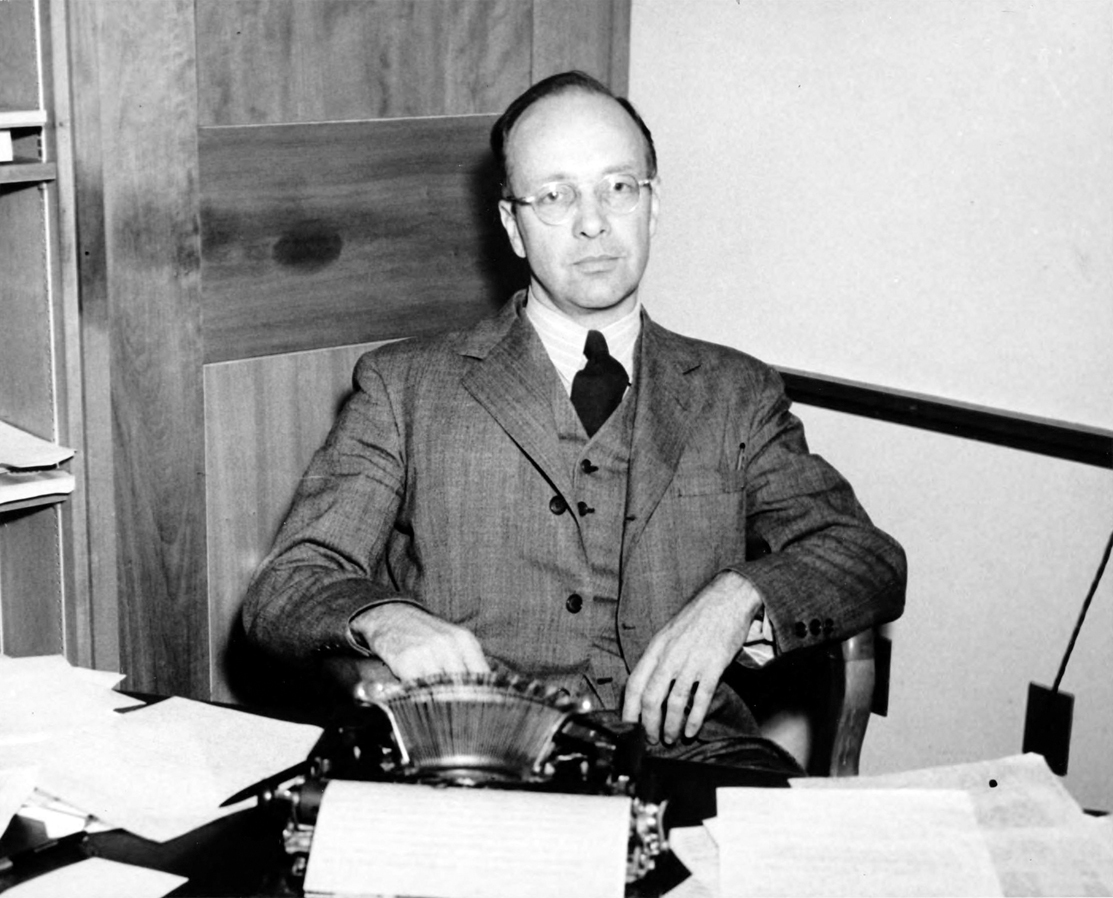
- Born: May 24, 1907; Huron, South Dakota, U.S.
- Died: September 14, 1991 (aged 84); Cambridge, Massachusetts, U.S.
- Education: University of Wisconsin, Madison (attended); Harvard University (BA); Balliol College, Oxford (BLitt, DPhil)
- Spouse: Wilma Denion Cannon
- Children: 2

Chinese name
- Traditional Chinese: 費正清
- Simplified Chinese: 费正清
Transcriptions
Standard Mandarin
- Hanyu Pinyin: Fèi Zhèngqīng
- Wade–Giles: Fei^{4} Chêng^{4}-ch'ing^{1}
Yue: Cantonese
- Yale Romanization: Fai Jing Chīng
- Jyutping: Fai3 Zing3-cing1

John King Fairbank (May 24, 1907 – September 14, 1991) was an American sinologist. He was a historian of China and United States–China relations. He taught at Harvard University from 1936 until his retirement in 1977. He is credited with building the field of China studies in the United States after World War II with his organizational ability, his mentorship of students, support of fellow scholars, and formulation of basic concepts to be tested.

The Fairbank Center for Chinese Studies at Harvard is named after him. Among his most widely read books are The United States and China, first published in 1948 and revised editions in 1958, 1979, and 1983; East Asia: The Great Tradition (1960) and East Asia The Great Transformation (1965), co-authored with Edwin O. Reischauer; and his co-edited series, The Cambridge History of China.

== Early life ==
Fairbank was born in Huron, South Dakota, in 1907. His father was Arthur Boyce Fairbank (1873–1936), a lawyer, and his mother was Lorena King Fairbank (1874–1979), who campaigned for women's suffrage. His paternal grandfather, John Barnard Fairbank, was "from the long 'J.B.' line, mainly of Congregational ministers, which stemmed from the Fairbank family that came to Massachusetts in 1633 [and] graduated... from Union Theological Seminary, New York, in 1860." John K. Fairbank was educated at Sioux Falls High School, Phillips Exeter Academy, the University of Wisconsin–Madison, Harvard College, and Oxford University (Balliol). As an undergraduate, he was advised by Charles Kingsley Webster, the distinguished British diplomatic historian who was then teaching at Harvard, to choose a relatively-undeveloped field of study. Webster suggested that since the Qing dynasty's archives were then being opened, China's foreign relations would be a prudent choice. Fairbank later admitted that he then knew nothing about China itself.

In 1929, when he graduated from Harvard summa cum laude, he went to Oxford as a Rhodes scholar. At Oxford, Fairbank began his study of the Chinese language and sought the counsel of H.B. Morse, retired from the Imperial Maritime Customs Service. On Webster's advice, he had read Morse's three-volume study of the Qing dynasty's foreign relations on the ship that was coming to England. Morse became his mentor. The young scholar decided to go to China for language study and research and arrived in China in January 1932.

In Beijing, he studied at Tsinghua University under the direction of the prominent historian Tsiang Tingfu, who introduced him to the study of newly available diplomatic sources and the perspectives of Chinese scholarship, which balanced the British approaches he saw at Oxford.

Wilma Denio Cannon, the eldest daughter of Walter Bradford Cannon and sister of Marian Cannon Schlesinger, came to China in 1932 to join Fairbank. They were married on June 29, 1932. Wilma had studied fine arts at Radcliffe College and had been an apprentice to the Mexican muralist Diego Rivera before she traveled to China. She began a career of her own in Chinese art history. John and Wilma came to know a number of Chinese intellectuals. They became especially warm friends with Liang Sicheng, the son of the Chinese reformer Liang Qichao, and his wife, Lin Huiyin, whom they called Phyllis. The Lins introduced them to Jin Yuelin, a philosopher and originally a political scientist trained at Columbia University. Fairbank wrote later that he and Wilma began to sense through them that the Chinese problem was the "necessity to winnow the past and discriminate among things foreign, what to preserve and what to borrow...." Sicheng gave Wilma and John Chinese names, his was Fei Zhengqing, "Fei" being a common family name, and "Zhengqing", meaning "upright and clear". Hers was "Weimei", which means "comforting plum."

== Early career ==
Fairbank returned to Harvard in 1936 to take up a position teaching Chinese history and was its first full-time specialist at Harvard. In 1941 he and Edwin O. Reischauer worked out a year-long introductory survey covering China and Japan, later adding Korea and Southeast Asia. The course was known as "Rice Paddies," and it became the basis for two influential texts: East Asia: The Great Tradition (Boston: Houghton Mifflin, 1960) and East Asia: The Modern Transformation (Boston: Houghton Mifflin, 1965).

Following the outbreak of the Pacific War in 1941, Fairbank was enlisted for service in the Office of Strategic Services in Washington and the Office of War Information in Chongqing, the temporary capital of Nationalist China.

== Chinese studies ==
=== Development of field ===
When he returned to Harvard after the war, Fairbank inaugurated a master's degree program in area studies, one of several major universities in the United States to do so. That approach at Harvard was multi-disciplinary and aimed to train journalists, government officials, and others who did not want careers in academia. That broad approach, combined with Fairbank's experience in China during the war, shaped his United States and China (Cambridge, Massachusetts: Harvard University Press, Foreign Policy Library, 1948). That survey went through new editions in 1958 and 1970, each synthesizing scholarship in the field for both students and the general public. In 1972, in preparation for Nixon's visit, the book was read by leaders on both sides.

=== Scholarship and influence ===
Fairbank taught at Harvard until he retired in 1977. He published a number of both academic and non-academic works on China, many of which would reach a wide audience outside academia. He also published an expanded revision of his doctoral dissertation as Trade and Diplomacy on the China Coast in 1953. One of his students, Paul Cohen, noted that the approaches or stages in the development of China studies of the 1950s are sometimes referred to as "the Harvard 'school' of China studies."

Fairbank played a major role in developing Harvard as a leading American center for East Asian studies, including establishing the Center for East Asian Research, which was renamed the Fairbank Center for Chinese Studies after his retirement. He was its director from 1955 to 1973.

Fairbank raised money to support fellowships for graduate students, trained influential China historians at Harvard, and placed them widely in universities and colleges in the US and overseas. He welcomed and funded researchers from all over the world to spend time in Cambridge and hosted a series of conferences, which brought scholars together and yielded publications, many of which Fairbank edited himself. He established the Harvard East Asian Series, which published monographs to enable students to publish dissertations, which was essential for achieving tenure.

Among his students were Albert Feuerwerker, Merle Goldman, Joseph Levenson, Immanuel C. Y. Hsu, Akira Iriye, Philip A. Kuhn, Kwang-ching Liu, Roderick MacFarquhar, Rhoads Murphey, David S. Nivison, Andrew Nathan, David Tod Roy, Benjamin I. Schwartz, Franz Schurmann, Teng Ssu-yu, James C. Thomson Jr., Theodore White, John E. Wills Jr., Alexander Woodside, Guy S. Alitto, Mary C. Wright.

Fairbank was an elected member of both the American Academy of Arts and Sciences and the American Philosophical Society.

== Reception ==
=== Accusations of communist sympathies ===
In the late 1940s, Fairbank was among the so-called China Hands who predicted the victory of Mao Zedong's Chinese Communist Party and advocated the establishment of relations with the new government. Although Fairbank argued that relations with the new China would be in the American national interest, the China Lobby and many other Americans accused the China Hands of selling out an ally, promoting the spread of Communism, and being under Soviet influence. During an intensification of the Cold War in 1949, Fairbank was targeted for being "soft" on Communism and was denied a visa to visit Japan. In 1952, he testified before the McCarran Committee, but his secure position at Harvard protected him. Ironically, many of Fairbank's Chinese friends and colleagues who returned to China after 1949, such as Fei Xiaotong, Ch'ien Tuan-sheng, and Chen Han-seng, would later be attacked for being "pro-American," as the Chinese Communist Party took on a stance that was increasingly anti-Western in the 1950s and the 1960s.

Critics in Taiwan charged that Fairbank was a Communist tool. According to Chen Lifu, former Republic of China minister of education, Fairbank and his wife "spread rumors, attacked Chinese government officials, and provided false information to the United States government, which helped to produce incorrect policies that eventually benefited the Communist forces".

=== Accusations of US imperialism ===
During the Vietnam War in the late 1960s, Fairbank, who had earlier been criticized as being pro-communist, came under fire from younger scholars and graduate students in the new Committee of Concerned Asian Scholars, which he had helped form but then soon ended his participation.

The younger scholars charged that Fairbank and other leaders of the area studies movement had helped to justify American imperialism in Asia. By his grounding the study of Asia in modernization theory, Fairbank and other liberal scholars presented China as an irrational country, which needed American tutelage. Since Fairbank rejected revolution, he condoned imperialism. A further charge was that scholars of the Harvard School had put forth a "radical new version" of China's modern history that argued imperialism "was largely beneficial in China."

In December 1969, Howard Zinn and other members of the Radical Historians' Caucus attempted to persuade the American Historical Association to pass an anti-Vietnam War resolution. A later report said a "debacle unfolded as Harvard historian (and AHA president in 1968) John Fairbank literally wrestled the microphone from Zinn's hands", in what Fairbank called "our briefly-famous Struggle for the Mike."

== Death ==
Fairbank finished the manuscript of his final book, China: A New History in the summer of 1991. On September 14, 1991, he delivered the manuscript to Harvard University Press, then returned home and suffered a fatal heart attack. He was survived by his wife, Wilma, and their two daughters, Laura Fairbank Haynes and Holly Fairbank Tuck.

== Selected works ==
In a statistical overview derived from writings by and about John King Fairbank, OCLC/WorldCat encompasses roughly 600+ works in 1,500+ publications in 15 languages and 43,000+ library holdings.

- -- The origin of the Chinese Maritime Customs Service, 1850-58. University of Oxford DPhil thesis, 1936.
- -- The United States and China. Cambridge, Massachusetts: Harvard University Press, 1st ed 1948; 4th, enl. ed. 1983. online 4th edition
- -- Trade and Diplomacy on the China Coast: The Opening of the Treaty Ports, 1842–1854. 2 vols. Cambridge, Massachusetts: Harvard University Press, 1953. online
- -- "Patterns Behind the Tientsin Massacre." Harvard Journal of Asiatic Studies 20, no. 3/4 (1957): 480–511.
- -- Ch'ing Administration: Three Studies. (with Têng Ssu-yü) Harvard-Yenching Institute Studies, V. 19. Cambridge: Harvard University Press, 1960.
- -- China: The People's Middle Kingdom and the U.S.A (Cambridge, MA: Belknap Press of Harvard University Press, 1967).
- -- China Perceived; Images and Policies in Chinese-American Relations (New York: Knopf, 1974).
- -- Chinese-American Interactions : A Historical Summary (New Brunswick, NJ: Rutgers University Press, 1975).
- -- Chinabound: a fifty-year memoir. New York : Harper & Row, 1982. online
- -- The Great Chinese Revolution, 1800–1985 (New York: Harper & Row, 1986). online
- -- China Watch (Harvard University Press, 1987) online
- -- China: A New History. Cambridge, Massachusetts: Belknap Press of Harvard University Press, 1992. Enlarged Edition, with Merle Goldman, 1998; Second Enlarged Edition, 2006. Translated into Chinese, French, Japanese, Korean, Czech; OCLC 490612305 online

=== Collaborative works ===
- John K. Fairbank, Kwang-Ching Liu, Modern China; a Bibliographical Guide to Chinese Works, 1898–1937 (Cambridge,: Harvard University Press, 1950).
- Conrad Brandt, Benjamin Schwartz, John K. Fairbank, eds., A Documentary History of Chinese Communism (Cambridge: Harvard University Press, 1952). online
- Ssu-yü Têng, John K. Fairbank Chaoying Fang and others. [Prepared in coöperation with the International Secretariat of the Institute of Pacific Relations] with E-tu Zen Sun, eds., China's Response to the West: A Documentary Survey, 1839–1923 (Cambridge, Massachusetts: Harvard University Press, 1954). online
- John King Fairbank, Masataka Banno (坂野 正高 Banno Masataka), Japanese Studies of Modern China; a Bibliographical Guide to Historical and Social-Science Research on the 19th and 20th Centuries (Rutland, Vt.,: Published for the Harvard-Yenching Institute by C. E. Tuttle Co., 1955). online
- Edwin O. Reischauer, John K. Fairbank Albert M. Craig, A History of East Asian Civilization (Boston,: Houghton Mifflin, 1960). revised as East Asia: Tradition and Transformation (1989) online
- Noriko Kamachi, Ichiko Chuzo & John King Fairbank, Japanese Studies of Modern China since 1953: A Bibliographical Guide to Historical and Social Science Research on the Nineteenth and Twentieth Centuries : Supplementary Volume for 1953–1969 (Cambridge, Massachusetts: East Asian Research Center, Harvard University : distributed by Harvard University Press, 1975).
- Denis Twitchett & John K. Fairbank (eds), The Cambridge History of China (Cambridge; New York: Cambridge University Press, 1978-).
- John King Fairbank, Martha Henderson Coolidge & Richard J. Smith, H. B. Morse, Customs Commissioner and Historian of China (Lexington: University Press of Kentucky, 1995).

=== Conference volumes ===
- John King Fairbank, ed.,Chinese Thought and Institutions (Chicago: University of Chicago Press, 1957).
- John King Fairbank, The Chinese World Order; Traditional China's Foreign Relations (Cambridge, Massachusetts: Harvard University Press, 1968).
- Frank Algerton Kierman, John King Fairbank, eds., Chinese Ways in Warfare (Cambridge, Massachusetts: Harvard University Press, 1974).
- John King Fairbank, ed., The Missionary Enterprise in China and America (Cambridge: Harvard University Press, 1974). online
- Suzanne Wilson Barnett John King Fairbank, ed., Christianity in China: Early Protestant Missionary Writings (Cambridge, Massachusetts: Published by the Committee on American-East Asian Relations of the Dept. of History in collaboration with the Council on East Asian Studies/Harvard University : Distributed by the Harvard University Press, 1985).
- Ernest R. May, John King Fairbank, eds, America's China Trade in Historical Perspective: The Chinese and American Performance (Cambridge, Massachusetts: Committee on American-East Asian Relations of the Department of History in collaboration with Council on East Asian Studies distributed by Harvard University Press, 1986).

=== Edited letters and texts ===
- John King Fairbank, Katherine Frost Bruner, et al., The I. G. In Peking Letters of Robert Hart, Chinese Maritime Customs, 1868-1907 (Cambridge, Massachusetts: Belknap Press of Harvard University Press, 1975).
- Katherine Frost Bruner, John King Fairbank, et al., Entering China's Service: Robert Hart's Journals, 1854–1863 (Cambridge, Massachusetts: Council on East Asian Studies Distributed by the Harvard University Press, 1986).
- Richard J. Smith, John King Fairbank, et al., Robert Hart and China's Early Modernization: His Journals, 1863–1866 (Cambridge, Massachusetts: Published by the Council on East Asian Studies Distributed by the Harvard University Press, 1991).
