= Teng Ssu-yü =

Chinese-American sinologist

- Traditional Chinese: 鄧嗣禹
- Simplified Chinese: 邓嗣禹
Transcriptions
Standard Mandarin
- Hanyu Pinyin: Dèng Sìyǔ
- Wade–Giles: Teng Ssu-yü

Teng Ssu-yü (Chinese: 鄧嗣禹; August 12, 1906 – April 5, 1988) was a Sinologist, bibliographer, and professor of history at Indiana University. Born in Hunan Province, Qing China, he died in Bloomington, Indiana, after being struck by a car. Teng was trained in China in both the traditional skills of the Confucian scholar and contemporary historical attitudes and techniques. When he came to the United States in 1937, he became a member of the founding generation of American China studies. He wrote not only specialized monographs and bibliographical tools for academics but also such broad studies for introductory students as China's Response to the West.

== Academic training and career ==
Teng Ssu-yü first studied history at Yenching University, in Beiping (now Beijing), where he spent nearly a decade first as student, then as instructor. There he came under the teaching and influence of American trained historians such as William Hung and Gu Jiegang and met American graduate students in Chinese history, John King Fairbank and Knight Biggerstaff. At Yenching he edited the university's Historical Annual and was an instructor in history from 1935 to 1937. As the Sino-Japanese War erupted in 1937, Teng joined the staff of the Library of Congress in Washington as Assistant Compiler in the Orientalia Collection. At the invitation of his classmate, Fang Chao-ying, who was collaborating with Arthur W. Hummel, Sr. on the monumental Eminent Chinese of the Ch'ing Period (Washington, D.C.: Government Printing Office, 1943), Teng turned his attention to biography and eventually contributed thirty-three articles, most of them dealing with the Taiping Rebellion of the mid-19th century. In 1938, he entered the Harvard University Graduate School and received his Ph.D. in history in 1942. During these years, John Fairbank attracted him from a traditional sinological focus to studies of modern Chinese history and diplomacy. He and Fairbank teamed on a series of articles in the Harvard Journal of Asiatic Studies which exploited the newly published archives to explain the structure of the Qing dynasty's initial interaction with the west.

In 1941, Teng joined the University of Chicago as Assistant Professor of Chinese History and Literature and as Acting Director of the Far East Library. He collaborated with Herrlee G. Creel to edit Chinese language textbooks for military personnel, Newspaper Chinese by the Inductive Method (Chicago: University of Chicago Press, 1943). After the war, Teng returned briefly to China. He spent the academic year 1949–1950 at Harvard and at the end of the year joined the Department of History at Indiana University.

== Works and influence ==
Teng was the author or collaborated on some twenty books, more than fifty articles in journals, and too many reviews to list here. At Indiana University he focused on Nineteenth Century rebellions in China, but his publications ranged from a study of the Chinese examination system, Confucian family rules, Chinese diplomacy at Nanking in 1842, and the historiography of the Qing and Ming periods. To these he added items in Howard Boorman, et al. eds, Biographical Dictionary of Republican China, the emergence of Japanese studies on Japan and the Far East, and Chinese secret societies in the Twentieth Century. The Taiping Rebellion and the Western Powers was published in 1971.

These broad historical studies rested on firm bibliographical control. In their "Indiana University Faculty Memorial Resolution", after Teng's death, two of his colleagues commented that "More than an accomplished historian, he was a consummate bibliographer whose range and depth of knowledge of Chinese writers and writings were extraordinary." They recalled that Teng once reflected, "Just as lively fish without water would die, so a research scholar without access to books could perish." They added, after noting Teng's scholarship, that he would be "most fondly remembered, not for his numerous publications, but for his legendary culinary prowess. He brought to the art of cooking the same dedication, the same striving for perfection, that characterized his scholarship."

His wife was Margaret Susan Henriques Teng (1917-1994).

== Partial List of English Language Publications ==
=== Major Books ===
- -- Knight Biggerstaff. An Annotated Bibliography of Selected Chinese Reference Works, in cooperation Beiping: Harvard-Yenching Institute, Yenching University, 1936; Cambridge, Massachusetts: Harvard University Press, 2nd ed., 1950; 3rd ed., 1971.
- --, J. K. Fairbank. China's Response to the West, Cambridge, Mass.: Harvard University Press, 1954; various reprints: 1994 ISBN 0674120256.
- Li Chien-nung, translated and edited by S. Y. Teng and Jeremy Ingalls.The Political History of China, 1840-1928, Princeton: Van Nostrand Company, 1956. (Paperback edition issued by Stanford University Press.)
- John King Fairbank and --, Ch'ing Administration: Three Studies, Cambridge, Massachusetts: Harvard University Press, 1960. Originally published in Harvard journal of Asiatic studies, 1939-1941
- --, Japanese Studies on Japan & the Far East. Hong Kong: University of Hong Kong; Oxford: Oxford University Press, 1961.
- --, The Nien Army and Their Guerrilla Warfare, 1851-1868. Paris: Mouton, 1961. (Reprint: Westport, Conn.: Greenwood Press, 1984.)
- --, Historiography of the Taiping Rebellion. Cambridge, Massachusetts: Harvard University Press, 1962.
- --, New Light on the History of the Taiping Rebellion. Cambridge, MA: Harvard University Press, 1950; New York: Russell & Russell, 1966.
- --, Family Instructions for the Yen Clan (Yen-shih chia-hstin), an annotated translation of the classic by Yen Chih-t'ui (531-ca. 597). Toung Pao. Monographic vol. IV. Leiden: E.J. Brill, 1968.
- --, The Taiping Rebellion and the Western Powers. Oxford: Clarendon Press, 1971; 2nd edition, Taipei: Wen-hai, 1978. (With official consent of the Clarendon Press.)
- --, China Revisited by an Overseas Chinese Historian. The First Trip, 1972; The Second Trip, 1978. Washington, D.C.: The Center for Chinese Research Materials, 1979.
- --, Protest and Crime in China: A Bibliography of Secret Associations, Popular Uprisings, Peasant Rebellions. New York: Garland, 1981.

=== Representative English Language articles ===
- with John K. Fairbank, "On the Transmission of Ch'ing Documents", Harvard Journal of Asiatic Studies 4, no. 1 (1939): 12–46. 12.
- with John K. Fairbank, "On the Types and Uses of Ch'ing Documents", Harvard Journal of Asiatic Studies 5, no. 1 (1940): 1–71. 13.
- with John K. Fairbank, "On the Ch'ing Tributary System", Harvard Journal of Asiatic Studies 6, no. 2 (1941): 135–246. JSTOR 2718006. Reprinted as Ch'ing Administration: Three Studies (above).
- "Chinese Influence on the Western Examination System", Harvard Journal of Asiatic Studies 7 (1942-1943): 267-312. JSTOR 2717830.
- "The Predispositions of Westerners in Treating Chinese History and Civilization", Historian 19.3 (1957): 307-327. JSTOR 24436592.
- "Wang Fu-chih's Views on History and Historical Writing", Journal of Asian Studies 28, no. 1 (November 1968): 111–23. JSTOR 2942842.
- "Education and Intellectual Life in China after the Cultural Revolution", Contemporary Education 45, no. 3 (Spring 1974): 174–82.
- "Cheng Ch'iao (1108–1166)", in Sung Biographies, ed. Herbert Franke (Wiesbaden, Germany: Steiner, 1976).
- "Chu Yuan-chang", in Ming Biographical Dictionary, ed. L. Carrington Goodrich and Chaoying Fang (New York: Columbia University Press, (1976), vol. 1.
- "The Role of the Family in the Chinese Legal System", Journal of Asian History 2, no. 2 (November 1977): 121–55. JSTOR 41930248.

== Sources ==
- Runcheng Chen, "Deng Siyu (Teng Ssu-Yu) and the Development of American Sinology after World War II", Chinese Studies in History 41.1 (Fall 2007): 3-40.
- Meeting Minutes April 18, 1989 Memorial Resolution UNIVERSITY PROFESSOR EMERITUS SSU-YU TENG (August 12, 1906 - April 5, 1988)
- John K. Fairbank, "Obituary: S.Y. Teng (1906–1988)", Journal of Asian Studies 47, no. 3 (August 1988): 723–24.
- Two of his former students edited a special issue of Chinese Studies in History 1992
