= Paul Cohen (historian) =

American historian of China (1934–2025)

Paul A. Cohen (Chinese name: Chinese: 柯文; pinyin: Kē Wén, June 2, 1934 – September 15, 2025) was an American sinologist and historian of China who was the Edith Stix Wasserman Professor of Asian Studies and History at Wellesley College and an associate of the Fairbank Center for Chinese Studies at Harvard University. His research interests included 19–20th century China; historical thought; American historiography on China. He wrote influential books on modern Chinese history, as well as historiography, such as Discovering History in China (1984; 2010). His works have been translated into several languages including Chinese, Korean, and Japanese.

In 2007, The Chinese Historical Review devoted a Festschift issue to his works.

== Life and career ==
Cohen was born in Great Neck, New York, on June 2, 1934. He studied at Cornell University from 1952 to 1953, before he transferred to the University of Chicago, where he received his BA in 1955. He received his MA in 1957 and PhD in 1961 from Harvard University, where he was a student of John King Fairbank and Benjamin I. Schwartz. After completing his doctorate, he worked at the University of Michigan from 1962 to 1963. He was a faculty member in the History department at Amherst College from 1963 to 1965. He then taught at Wellesley College until his retirement, and was an Associate of the Fairbank Center for Chinese Studies at Harvard University.

He was married twice and had four children. He had three children from his first marriage to Andrea O. Dean (her death) an architectural critic, and one child from his second marriage to Jane M. Cohen (divorced), who served on the faculty at the University of Texas School of Law in Austin. Cohen died in Boston, Massachusetts, on September 15, 2025, at the age of 91. He was survived by Elizabeth Sinn, his partner of 28 years.

== Selected publications ==
- China and Christianity: The Missionary Movement and the Growth of Chinese Antiforeignism, 1860-1870 Cambridge: Harvard University Press, 1963.
- Between Tradition and Modernity: Wang T’ao and Reform in Late Ch’ing China Cambridge: Harvard University Press, 1974.
- Discovering History in China: American Historical Writing on the Recent Chinese Past. New York: Columbia University Press, 1984.
- History in Three Keys: The Boxers as Event, Experience, and Myth. New York: Columbia University Press, 1997.

Winner of the 1997 John K. Fairbank Prize in East Asian History and the 1997 New England Historical Book Award.

- China Unbound: Evolving Perspectives on the Chinese Past. London; New York: RoutledgeCurzon, 2003.
- Speaking to History: The Story of King Goujian in Twentieth-Century China. Berkeley: University of California Press, 2009.
- History and Popular Memory: The Power of Story in Moments of Crisis. New York: Columbia University Press, 2017.
- —— (2019), A Path Twice Traveled: My Journey as a Historian of China, Cambridge, MA: Harvard University Asia Center, ISBN 9780674237292
