= Paul G. Pickowicz =

American historian (born 1945)

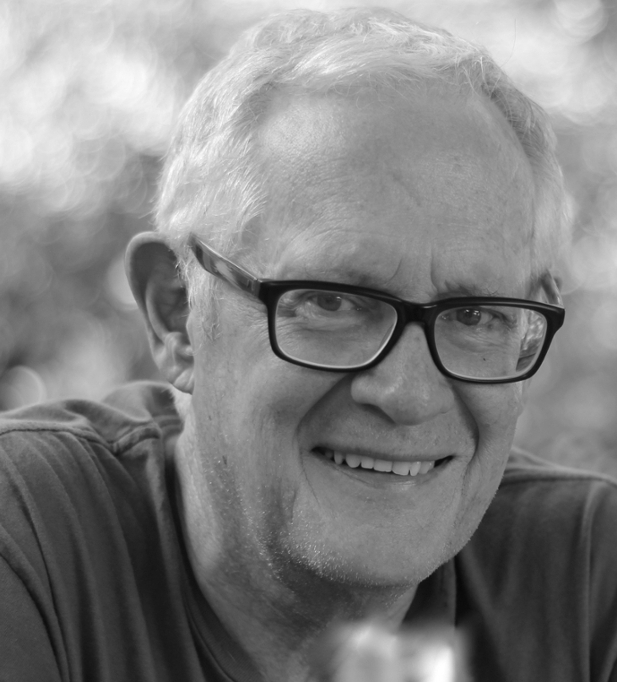
- Born: October 28, 1945 (age 80)
- Occupation: Historian

Paul G. Pickowicz (born October 28, 1945) is an American historian of modern China and Distinguished Professor of History and Chinese Studies at University of California at San Diego. He specialises in the history of China in the 20th century.

== Academic appointments and honors ==
Visiting professor, City University of Hong Kong, 2004; Distinguished Visiting Scholar, University of Oxford, 2006; Visiting Senior Research Fellow, East Asian Institute, National University of Singapore, 2008; Distinguished Visiting Scholar, Si-Mian Institute for Advanced Studies in Humanities, East China Normal University, Shanghai, China, 2010; Distinguished Visiting Fellow, Faculty of Arts and Social Sciences, Department of Chinese Studies, National University of Singapore, 2011.

Honors

- 1993 Joseph Levenson Prize of the Association for Asian Studies for Chinese Village, Socialist State – Best book on 20th century China in any discipline.
- 1998 UCSD Alumni Association Distinguished Teaching Award
- 2003 UCSD Chancellor's Associates Faculty Award for Excellence in Graduate Teaching
- 1998–present Member, Editorial Board, Modern Chinese Literature and Culture
- 2006–present Member, Advisory Board, Journal of Chinese Cinemas
- 2007–present Inaugural Holder of the University of California, San Diego Endowed Chair in Modern Chinese History
- 2009 UCSD Academic Senate Distinguished Teaching Award
- 2009–present International Advisory Group, Humanities Korea Project, Center for Interdisciplinary Research on China, Kookmin University, Seoul, South Korea
- 2010–present Member, Editorial Board, Zhongguo dangdai shi yanjiu [Journal of Contemporary Chinese History] (Shanghai)
- 2011–present Member, Editorial Board,Chinese Historical Review

== Education and career ==
After graduating from Springfield College in 1967 with a degree in history, Picowicz took a master's degree in history from Tufts University in 1968, writing his master's thesis on American relations with China in the Canton Trade. Pickowicz then trained at University of Wisconsin, Madison in modern Chinese intellectual history with Maurice Meisner. He wrote his doctoral thesis on the Marxist intellectual, Qu Qiubai, who was influential in forming leftist literary theory before he was executed by the Nationalist government in 1935. He was awarded a Ph.D. degree in 1973. His book on Qu was published by University of California Press in 1981.

Pickowicz was among a group of American students to travel to the People's Republic of China as a delegation of the Committee of Concerned Asian Scholars in 1971.

After joining the faculty of University of California, San Diego in 1973, he broadened his interests to include local village history. Together with Edward Friedman and Mark Selden, Pickowicz spent several years in a north China village interviewing and observing residents and local officials. Official views in China and many western scholars had seen Mao's revolution as a "peasant revolution, but their two books, Chinese Village, Socialist State and Revolution, Resistance, and Reform in Village China presented a detailed and dramatic picture of state exploitation. The volumes explained the seeming success of radical village experiments, such as those at Dazhai, by the discovery that the state had given them extensive subsidies.

His interest in the history of Chinese film led to a series of articles and books.

At the University of California, San Diego, Pickowicz and his colleague Joseph Esherick inaugurated a doctoral program in modern Chinese history which has produced several dozen students whose theses have been published as books.

== Works on the Chinese village under socialism ==
The collaborative work with Esherick and Friedman drew both praise and critical discussion.

The two books describe the village of Wugong, in Raoyang county, Hebei, some 200 kilometres south of Beijing. Wugong was designated as a model village, partly to honor its having founded a co-operative at the height of the Second Sino-Japanese War. The first volume is devoted to the 1940s and 1950s, which include the war years and the coming to power of the Communist Revolution and the land-reform campaigns. The second begins with the formation of the commune and the famine of the Great Leap Forward and follows the village through the early years of the next century. In each, the leading figure is Geng Changsuo (1900- 1985), the leading cadre.

Lucien Bianco, a French historian who specializes in rural Chinese history, wrote that he did not share the enthusiasm for the first volume, but thought that this second volume was much better. He felt that offering a step-by-step chronicle brought a certain lack of focus and did not offer a thematic context. The great difference from the first volume, however, was that the authors have “lost their illusions.” This is best illustrated, Bianco felt, through “the themes of patronage and clientelism, and the privileges which have been perpetuated from Mao’s revolutionary era through to the current post-revolutionary era.” These themes were present in the first volume, but the second one details “the themes of patronage and clientelism, and the privileges which have been perpetuated from Mao’s revolutionary era through to the current post-revolutionary era,” and the authors make clear “not only the favours but also the denunciations and recantations which disgraced leaders are forced into by changes in the Party line, beginning with Geng Changsuo (1900- 1985), Wugong’s established head.” Bianco also praises the book for its refusal to condemn the opportunistic leader, Geng, who made his family rich but himself lived simply, and who kept the loyalty of the villagers even when the Red Guards were sent to unseat him: “He is authoritarian without mistreating the villagers.” Bianco concludes that “Nothing is one-sided, or caricatural in this book, not even the condemnation of Maoism or its freeloading inferior successors. It is a local history told with a critical distance but never bereft of sympathy. It is a sober, concise, incisive account, quite often simply complemented by a final line or concluding phrase.”

== Studies on film and culture ==
Pickowicz told an interviewer that he was made to feel unwelcome when he first did research in Chinese archives but the situation gradually improved.

== Works ==
- Marxist Literary Thought and China: A Conceptual Framework. Berkeley: The Center for Chinese Studies, University of California, Berkeley, 1980. Chinese edition: "Makesizhuyi wenxue sixiang yu Zhongguo", in Zhongguo shchui kexue yuan wenxue yanjiu suo, ed., Guowai Zhongguo wenxue yanjiu luncong (Beijing: Zhongguo wenlian chuban gongsi, 1985), s. 1-46.
- Marxist Literary Thought in China: The Influence of Ch'u Ch'iu-pai. Berkeley: University of California Press, 1981. Korean edition: Chungguk Maruk'usujuui Munyeiron: Kuch'ubaegui Yonghyang (Seoul: Ch'ongnyonsa, 1991). Chinese edition: Shusheng zhengzhijia: Ou Oiubai qu zhe de yisheng (Beijing: Zhongguo zhuo yue chuban gongsi, 1990).
- Unofficial China: Popular Culture and Thought in the People's Republic. Boulder: Westview Press, 1989 (with Perry Link and Richard Madsen).
- Chinese Village, Socialist State. New Haven: Yale University Press, 1991 (with Edward Friedman and Mark Selden). Chinese edition: Zhongguo xiangcun-shehuizhuyi guojia (Beijing: Shehui kekue wenxian chuban she, 2002).
- New Chinese Cinemas: Forms, Identities, Politics. Cambridge: Cambridge University Press, 1994 (with Nick Browne, Vivian Sobchack and Esther Yau).
- Popular China: Unofficial Culture in a Globalizing Society. New York: Rowman and Littlefield, 2002 (with Perry Link and Richard Madsen).
- The Chinese Cultural Revolution as History. Stanford CA: Stanford University Press, 2006 (with Joseph W. Esherick and Andrew G. Walder)
- Revolution, Resistance, and Reform in Village China. New Haven: Yale University Press, 2005. (Co-authored with Edward Friedman and Mark Selden).
- From Underground to Independent: Alternative Film Culture in Contemporary China. New York: Rowman and Littlefield Publishers, 2006. (Co-edited with Yingjin Zhang).
- The Chinese Cultural Revolution as History. Stanford: Stanford University Press, 2006. (Co-edited with Joseph Esherick and Andrew Walder).
- Exhibiting Chinese Cinemas, Reconstructing Reception, Special Issue of Journal of Chinese Cinemas, vol. 3, no. 2, 2009. (Co-edited with Matthew Johnson).
- Dilemmas of Victory: The Early Years of the People’s Republic of China. Cambridge: Harvard University Press, 2007. (Co-edited with Jeremy Brown). Chinese edition: Shengli de kunjing: Zhonghua renmin gongheguo de zuichu suiyue. Xianggang: Zhongwen daxue chuban she, 2011.
- Radicalism, Revolution, and Reform in Modern China. New York: Lexington Books, 2011. (Co-edited with Catherine Lynch and Robert B. Marks). Festschift in honor of Maurice Meisner.
- China on the Margins. Ithaca: Cornell University East Asia Series, 2010. (Co-edited with Sherman Cochran).
- China on Film: A Century of Exploration, Confrontation, and Controversy. New York: Rowman and Littlefield *Publishers, 2012.
- ———— (2019). A Sensational Encounter with High Socialist China. Hong Kong: City University of Hong Kong Press. ISBN 9789629375461.
