= Hungry Ghosts: Mao's Secret Famine =

1998 book by Jasper Becker

- Cover of the first edition
- Author: Jasper Becker
- Language: English
- Genre: History
- Publisher: Holt Paperbacks
- Publication date: 15 April 1998
- Publication place: United Kingdom
- Media type: Print (hardback)
- ISBN: 0-8050-5668-8

Hungry Ghosts: Mao's Secret Famine is a book about the Great Chinese Famine by British author Jasper Becker, the former Beijing bureau chief for the South China Morning Post. Becker interviewed peasants in Henan Province and Anhui Province, both of which were significantly affected by the famine. Hungry Ghosts was the first major English book to provide a "comprehensive accessible account" of the man-made famine.

== Background ==
In 1958, Mao declared that China would be more prosperous than the United Kingdom within 15 years. His government set up thousands of people's communes to increase industrial production in a campaign called the Great Leap Forward. For a number of reasons, including radical agricultural policies, social pressure, economic mismanagement, and coincidental natural disasters, this campaign resulted in declining grain production, food insecurity, and eventually starvation in many parts of the country between 1959 and 1961. This famine would eventually be known as the Great Chinese Famine; estimated death tolls range from 15 million to 55 million people.

== Reception ==
Hungry Ghosts was positively reviewed by academics and reviewers, especially for the depth of its research and its clear account of the famine. Many called it horrifying or chilling. Others noted that the book was a valuable resource for Western audiences.

Kirkus Reviews called it "a remarkable book, the more devastating for its quietness and absence of rhetoric." A New York Times Book Review by political economist Nicholas Eberstadt called the book "a grim tribute to the dead and a challenge to our consciences." Isabel Hilton of The Independent argued that the book provides "a small memorial to those uncounted millions, a memorial the leaders who brought about those deaths will never erect."

Caroline Moorehead, writing in the New Statesman, stated that Becker's account was "as full as possible" given the difficulty of obtaining information on the famine. Publishers Weekly stated that the book was a "gripping, well-researched account" and "a testament to the folly of utopian engineering." Several reviewers, including historian Lee Feigon, sinologist Robert Ash, as well as Ann Scott Tyson of the Christian Science Monitor, highlighted the in-depth interviews from survivors as one of the most important aspects of the book.

Several critics pointed out the strong argument that Becker made against Mao's government and policies, especially the Great Leap Forward. A reviewer for The Economist wrote that Becker "passionately but precisely, Mr. Becker records the tragic results of one of the boldest example of Utopian engineering ever attempted". A review in Asiaweek referred to the book as "admirable history" and stated that Becker's research was a "damning indictment of Maoist policies." In The New York Times, Richard Bernstein stated that the book "firmly establishes the Great Leap and the resulting famine as one of the worst atrocities of all time". Journalist and historian Philip Bowring suggested that if there was greater awareness of the reality of the famine in China, there would be less reverence for Mao. Colina MacDougall, writing for Asian Affairs, agreed, saying that "publication of the truth would safeguard China against future leadership folly."

Historian Susan Whitfield, writing in the Financial Times, and French academic Jean-Philippe Beja, writing in the journal China Perspectives, both praised Becker for challenging the official explanation for the famine, which positioned it as being the result of natural disasters and downplayed the importance of political decisions. Writing in the London Review of Books, American sinologist Perry Link stated that "Becker makes an important argument that secrecy about famines is more than morally dubious in its own right, and more than practically disastrous because it erases the possibility of foreign aid."

=== Accuracy of research and analysis ===
The book attracted criticism from reviewers for its research and analysis. Paul Monk compared Hungry Ghosts to the work of Robert Conquest in his book Harvest of Sorrow (1986), which covered famine in the Soviet Union caused by agricultural reforms and collectivization. However, his review in The China Journal was highly critical of Hungry Ghosts. He felt that Becker had bypassed "the Soviet agrarian debate of the 1920s," and that his treatment of cannibalism in China was "lurid". Monk argued that Becker was insufficiently skeptical of claims about the famine, and found that took away from the book's underlying argument that "it was the tendency to exaggerate and play fast and loose with statistics in the interest of propaganda which helped to bring about the famine itself."

Sinologist Frederick Teiwes was strongly critical of the research and presentation in Hungry Ghosts. He called the book "maddeningly deficient in a number of important respects," said that Becker's "assertions are often unsourced," and called the book's infrequent footnotes "essentially unusable"; despite these critiques, he ultimately concluded that the book "provides a long overdue and salutary lesson for all concerned." Economist Carl Riskin felt that there were inaccuracies within the book – both exaggerations and plain factual errors – and echoed the issues Teiwes had with poorly-documented sources.

Political scientist Andrew J. Nathan described Becker's presentation of the famine for a Western audience as useful, but argued that Becker was careless with his sources. Although sinologist Robert Ash called the book "well-researched", he compared it unfavorably to Calamity and Reform in China (1996) by Dali L. Yang, stating that Yang's analysis offered superior insights. Some took issue with specific claims, such as American historian Paul G. Pickowicz, who wrote in The Wall Street Journal that he disagreed with Becker's claim that "even now in the West the famine is still not accepted as a historical event. Dirk Schmidt, reviewing for China Information, wrote that Becker "tends to oversimplify the intra-elite aspects of the [Great Leap Forward]." Historian and political economist Songlin Yang disputed Becker's claims that Mao "ignored the famine," noting State's Council reports from 1959 which indicated that Mao had pressed for hunger relief in a number of provinces.
