= Committee of Concerned Asian Scholars =

American anti-Vietnam War organization

The Committee of Concerned Asian Scholars (CCAS) was founded in 1968 by a group of graduate students and younger faculty as part of the opposition to the American participation in the Vietnam War. They proposed a "radical critique of the assumptions which got us [The United States] into Indo-China and were keeping us from getting out". The caucus was held at the Association for Asian Studies convention in Philadelphia, but was a radical critique of that professional association's values, organization, and leadership. The group was largely formed due to the Association for Asian Studies lack of public stance on the Vietnam War. Most of the original members were graduate students or junior faculty in Area Studies programs at Harvard, Stanford, University of Michigan, University of California at Berkeley, and Columbia University, although there were also independent scholars and those with no affiliation in the field.

On 30 March 1969, the group passed the following Statement of Purpose:

We first came together in opposition to the brutal aggression of the United States in Vietnam and to the complicity or silence of our profession with regard to that policy. Those in the field of Asian studies bear responsibility for the consequences of their research and the political posture of their profession. We are concerned about the present unwillingness of specialists to speak out against the implications of an Asian policy committed to ensuring American domination of much of Asia. We reject the legitimacy of this aim, and attempt to change this policy. We recognize that the present structure of the profession has often perverted scholarship and alienated many people in the field.

The Committee of Concerned Asian Scholars seeks to develop a humane and knowledgeable understanding of Asian societies and their efforts to maintain cultural integrity and to confront such problems as poverty, oppression, and imperialism. We realize that to be students of other peoples, we must first understand our relations to them. CCAS wishes to create alternatives to the prevailing trends in scholarship on Asia, which too often spring from a parochial cultural perspective and serve selfish interests and expansionism. Our organization is designed to function as a catalyst, a communications network for both Asian and Western scholars, a provider of central resources for local chapters, and a community for the development of anti-imperialist research.

== Evaluations and debates ==
Fabio Lanza's 2017 study, The End of Concern, provided a detailed history of the founding and early years of the organization. He charged, however, that the radicals in the group originally accepted the idea of a Maoist China as an egalitarian alternative to Western capitalism, but that when Deng Xiaoping opened China to world neo-liberalism, these scholars lost interest in basic reforms.

Richard Madsen of the University of California at San Diego sees the CCAS as part of a long line of populist criticism of academia, in this case projecting their values onto Mao's China. As graduate students, some of whom were in danger of being shipped off to Vietnam, "they identified themselves with the oppressed and saw the Cultural Revolution as a populist revolution expressing the aspirations of people like themselves." Their understandings of China, Madsen concludes, did not explain that cataclysmic event any more adequately than the social science theories they rejected.

Richard Baum of University of California at Los Angeles claimed that the CCAS anti-establishment stance had a polarizing effect on the field, that its early members promoted Maoist doctrine uncritically. He continued that CCAS made ludicrous claims such as all U.S.-government funded academic pursuits were being manipulated by the U.S. government if they were not outright forms of espionage, a stance quickly espoused by the P.R.C. which led to distrust and suspicion between P.R.C. representatives and academics.

== Publications ==
The Newsletter of the organization became the Bulletin of Committee of Concerned Asian Scholars (BCAS) in 1969.

- Committee of Concerned Asian Scholars., China! Inside the People's Republic (New York,: Bantam Books, 1972).
- Committee of Concerned Asian Scholars., The Indochina Story; a Fully Documented Account (New York,: Pantheon Books, 1970).
- Committee of Concerned Asian Scholars., Bulletin of Concerned Asian Scholars (Cambridge, Mass.: Bulletin of Concerned Asian Scholars, 1969–2000). 32 vols. 1968-2000 issues (Volumes 1-32) available online free of charge. From 2001 published as Critical Asian Studies.

== Founding members and contributors ==
- Herbert Bix
- Molly Joel Coye
- Bruce Cumings
- Norma Diamond
- John W. Dower
- Tom Engelhardt
- Joseph W. Esherick
- Edward Friedman
- A. Tom Grunfeld
- David Horowitz
- Leigh Bristol Kagan
- Richard C. Kagan
- Perry Link
- Maurice Meisner
- Ngo Vinh Long
- Victor Nee
- James Peck (Jim Peck)
- Paul G. Pickowicz
- Elizabeth J. Perry
- Carl Riskin
- Moss Roberts
- Mark Selden
- Orville Schell
- Susan Shirk
- Marilyn B. Young

== References and further reading ==
- Allen, Douglas (1989). "Antiwar Asian Scholars and the Vietnam/Indochina War". Bulletin of Concerned Asian Scholars. 21 (2–4): 112–135. doi:10.1080/14672715.1989.10404460.
- Chen, Xi (2017). "Visualizing Early 1970s China through the Lens of the Committee of Concerned Asian Scholars (Ccas) Friendship Delegations". Cross-Currents: East Asian History and Culture Review e-Journal. 23: 217–233. ISSN 2158-9674.
- Fabio Lanza, "Making Sense of "China" During the Cold War: Global Maoism and Asian Studies," in Jadwiga E. Pieper Mooney and Fabio Lanza, ed., De-Centering Cold War History: Local and Global Change (London: Routledge; 2013).
- Lanza, Fabio (2017). The End of Concern: Maoist China, Activism, and Asian Studies. Durham: Duke University Press. ISBN 9780822369325.
- Selden, Mark (2018). "Reflections on the Committee of Concerned Asian Scholars at Fifty". Critical Asian Studies. 50 (1): 3–15. doi:10.1080/14672715.2017.1421809. S2CID 149223439.
- Bryant, Avery; Doub, Bill; Doub, Nancy; Livingston, Jon; Moore, Joe, eds. (2018). "Speaking Truth to Power: Editors' Perspectives on the First Twenty Years of the Bulletin of Concerned Asian Scholars". Critical Asian Studies. 50 (2): 278–294. doi:10.1080/14672715.2018.1452678. S2CID 148659123.
