= Schaberg =

Schaberg is a surname. Notable people with the surname include:

- David Schaberg (born 1964), American academic
- Jane Schaberg (1938–2012), American academic
- Ralf Schaberg (born 1977), German slalom canoeist
