= Norma Diamond =

American anthropologist

Norma Diamond (b. New York City 1933 - d. 2011 Gainesville, Florida) was an American anthropologist who specialized in the study of Chinese society, especially in Taiwan, and women's studies. She was Professor of Anthropology at University of Michigan from 1963 to 1996, and named Professor Emerita. She was the first woman to be a tenure track professor in Anthropology at that institution.

The panel, "Gender, Power, and Ethnicity in China: Papers in Honor of Norma Diamond," at the 2005 American Anthropological Association annual meeting, was devoted to her work. She was a founding member of the Committee of Concerned Asian Scholars She was the first recipient of the George Peter Murdock Prize for Excellence in Ethnology in 1988 for her article, “The Miao and Poison: Interactions on China’s Frontier.”

== Early life and training ==
Diamond at age 16, after an accelerated high school course, enrolled in Queens College. In her first year she was assigned Ruth Benedict's Patterns of Culture. She later said that “this was the most extraordinary thing I had ever read and if that was what anthropologists did which was, essentially, questioning things we take for granted and trying to understand other cultures, maybe that’s something I should be doing.” After two years she moved to the University of Wisconsin, where she finished her undergraduate degree. The nationally known scholar Hans Gerth introduced her to the discipline of sociology, especially the Marxist influenced Frankfort School, and encouraged her to study Chinese. She enrolled in the graduate program in anthropology at Cornell University, where she worked with Lauriston Sharp, a specialist on Thailand; Morris Opler, whose fields included Native Americans and India; and Robert J. Smith, a Japan specialist. Her principal advisor was G. William Skinner, an anthropologist who specialized in China. She received her PhD in 1966.

Diamond was a founding member of the Committee of Concerned Asian Scholars, which organized Asia specialists to oppose American involvement in Vietnam, and was among the feminists in the group. The FBI monitored an Ann Arbor teach-in at which Diamond and two other anthropologists were speakers. Diamond later commented to a scholar that much of the information in the agent's report was wrong, and the agent had "never had a course.. from me on Chinese society and culture."

== Scholarly career ==
When Diamond joined the faculty at University of Michigan, the other women in the Anthropology Department were all adjunct lecturers. She was the first woman to be on the tenure track. A graduate student in the department later recalled Diamond as "a smart, accessible woman with an acerbic sense of humor," but that as a woman she was "excluded from casual interactions such as 'the guys' (male colleagues) going out for a beer." Marilyn Young, at the time a faculty wife who taught in the Residential College, recalled that Diamond "cut through every sort of bullshit—academic, bureaucratic, political….She just has this extraordinary eye that goes right underneath the surface and emerges many yards further on.”

Diamond is known as an early feminist anthropologist. Her course, "Second Sex/ Third World" which she initiated in 1970, was among the first courses in the comparative ethnography of women to be taught in the United States, and served as the impetus for the first edited volumes in the field of anthropology to take the status of women as a theme.

In 1979-1980, Diamond taught American literature as a "foreign expert" at the Institute of Modern American Literature of Shandong University, where she was the first American teacher since 1949. Although her original intent was to teach a survey of American literature and a graduate courses on Jewish-American writings, the political leadership of the Institute decided that she should teach only graduate students. She found that foreign teachers were welcomed by the younger faculty but resented by the political leadership, many of whom were left from the Cultural Revolution. The students, who had read little classical Chinese literature or modern Chinese writers, at first had a hard time understanding the style or purpose of American literature. The foreign teachers were resented for their privileges.

Even before her stay in China, she maintained a critical view of the Chinese Communist Revolution, especially its effects on women. Her article, “Collectivization, Kinship, and the Status of Women in Rural China,” published in the Bulletin of Concerned Asian Scholars and reprinted several other places, was based on field-work and interviews she performed in the summer of 1973. In it she weighs the claims that the revolution had solved the problem of women's liberation against the more skeptical view that women participate in leader role far less often than men, that they have lower payrates, and that the sexual division of labor continues.

== Scholarship and legacy ==
In the 1960s, since mainland China was not open to Americans, anthropologists interested in China did field-work in Hong Kong and Taiwan. Although many called the subject of these studies "China," Diamond spoke of "Taiwan" in her reports of fieldwork from the early 1960s and a return visit in 1969. .

Her book, K’un Shen: A Taiwan Village. Case Studies in Cultural Anthropology, wrote one of her former students, is "solid, interesting, accessible, and timeless in the best sense of the term, with hints of issues she would take up later, though the foundational book dutifully examined each topic in turn, in the style of the day. Still, we can see concern about women and their place within the family..." Her use of Marxist approaches shows in the emphasis on economic issues, rather than culture or ideology. David K. Jordan's review in the journal American Anthropologist said that Diamond describes what she observed in Taiwan "not as a denatured representation of a mainland that for the time being cannot be visited or of a single pan-Chinese pattern that Taiwan in theory ought to conform to," but as "something legitimate, a bona fide Chinese local tradition to be described on its own merits."

Her use of Marxist approaches shows in the emphasis on economic issues, rather than culture or ideology. She once explained that a "working assumption of this line of inquiry is that economic and political developments impinge on and reshape culture and ideology” . She also rejected the catch-all categories of “acculturation” and “modernization.” She favored economic and political analysis: “It was not the failings of village leaders and the peasants at large that explained Taitou’s modest growth but particular state policies and the interpretation of these policies by county and prefectural officials”

== Selected works ==
- Diamond, Norma (1969). K'un Shen: A Taiwan Village. New York: Holt, Rinehart and Winston.
- 1973 The Status of Women in Taiwan: One Step Forward, Two Steps Back. In Women in China: Studies in Social Change and Feminism. Marilyn B. Young, ed. Pp. 211–242. Ann Arbor: Center for Chinese Studies, University of Michigan.
- Diamond, Norma (1975). "Collectivization, Kinship, and the Status of Women in Rural China". Bulletin of Concerned Asian Scholars'. 7 (1): 25–35.; republished in Toward an Anthropology of Women. Rayna R. Reiter, ed. Pp. 372–395. New York: Monthly Review Press.
- —— (1976). "Women Under Kuomintang Rule: Variations on the Feminine Mystique" (PDF). Modern China. 1 (1): 3–45. doi:10.1177/009770047500100101. hdl:2027.42/68360. S2CID 145349116.
- —— (1979). "Women and Industry in Taiwan". Modern China. 5 (3): 317–340. doi:10.1177/009770047900500303. hdl:2027.42/68847. JSTOR 188892. S2CID 144073774.
- —— (1983a). "Teaching American Literature in Shandong". Asian Survey. 23 (11): 1194–1199. doi:10.2307/2644370. JSTOR 2644370.
- —— (1983b). "Model Villages and Village Realities" (PDF). Modern China. 9 (2): 163–181. doi:10.1177/009770048300900201. hdl:2027.42/68459. S2CID 67825132.
- ——— (1984). "Taitou Revisited: State Policies and Social Change". International Journal of Sociology. 14 (4): 77–100. doi:10.1080/15579336.1984.11769875.
- —— (1985). "Rural Collectivization and Decollectivization in China (Review Article)". The Journal of Asian Studies. 44 (4): 785–792. doi:10.2307/2056449. JSTOR 2056449. S2CID 155380887.
- 1988 "The Miao and Poison: Interactions on China’s Frontier". Ethnology 27(1):1–25.
- 1991 "Security and Alienation in Contemporary China". Reviews in Anthropology 17:123–130.
- 1995 "Defining the Miao: Ming, Qing, and Contemporary Views". In Cultural Encounters on China’s Ethnic Frontiers. Stevan Harrell, ed. Pp. 92–116. Seattle: University of Washington Press.
- 1996 "Christianity and the Hua Miao: Writing and Power". In Christianity in China: From the Eighteenth Century to the Present. Daniel H. Bays, ed. pp. 138–157. Stanford: Stanford University Press.
