= Moss Roberts =

Moss Roberts is an American sinologist, translator, and professor emeritus of Chinese at New York University. He is known for his English translation of the mid-Ming Chinese historical epic Romance of the Three Kingdoms, one of the Four Great Classical Novels of Chinese literature.

== Early life and education ==
He earned his B.A. from Columbia College in 1958, followed by an M.A. in English in 1960 and a Ph.D. in Chinese in 1966, both from Columbia University. His graduate studies focused on classical Chinese language and philosophy.

== Academic career ==
Roberts began his teaching career at the University of Miami in Coral Gables, Florida, where he served as assistant professor of Chinese in the Department of Foreign Languages from 1966 to 1968.

In 1968, he joined the faculty of New York University as an assistant professor in the Department of Near Eastern Languages and Literature (now known as the Department of Middle Eastern and Islamic Studies). He was promoted to associate professor in 1974 and full professor in 1984.

During his academic career, Roberts held multiple administrative positions at NYU, including Director of East Asian Studies, Chair of the Department of East Asian Studies and East Asian Language Instruction Coordinator. He was also active in various academic groups and editorial boards, including the Columbia University Seminars on Traditional and Early China, the American Oriental Society, the Association for Asian Studies, and the editorial boards of the Bulletin of Concerned Asian Scholars and Critical Asian Studies.

== Scholarly work ==
Roberts is primarily known for his translations and annotated editions of classical Chinese texts. His unabridged translation of Three Kingdoms, published in 1991 by the University of California Press and co-published with Foreign Language Press in Beijing; it was reviewed in the NY Times in 1993.

His earlier abridged translation, Three Kingdoms: China’s Epic Drama, was published by Pantheon Books in 1976 and selected for its scholarly backlist. In 2001, he published Dao De Jing: The Book of the Way, an annotated translation of the Daoist classic by Laozi, which includes extensive textual notes and a critical introduction. In 2020, he published an annotated critical edition of The Analects: Conclusions and Conversations of Confucius.

In addition to his books, Roberts has contributed articles and essays to scholarly journals such as the Bulletin of Concerned Asian Scholars and Critical Asian Studies where he served on the editorial board. His works include "Contra Ideocracy" (1997), "Bad Karma in Asia" (2000), and a Chinese-language Historical Overview of the Nanjing Massacre, published in 1995 by Joint Publishing in Nanjing. He has published articles on current events related to Asia in AsiaTimes online and SettimanaNews, some republished in the memoir and Bad Karma.

=== Vietnam War Research and Activism ===
Roberts was a member of the Committee of Concerned Asian Scholars (CCAS), a group of academics and students formed in 1968 in response to the Vietnam War. The organization sought to challenge U.S. foreign policy and promote critical, independent scholarship on Asia. He contributed to the Bulletin of Concerned Asian Scholars later renamed Critical Asian Studies from its inception through 2000.

== Selected bibliography ==
- Luo, Guanzhong; Roberts, Moss (1976). Three kingdoms: China's epic drama (1st ed.). New York: Pantheon Books. ISBN 978-0-394-40722-7.
- Mao, Zedong (1977). A critique of Soviet economics. New York: Monthly Review Press. ISBN 978-0-85345-412-0.
- Roberts, Moss (1980). Chinese Fairy Tales and Fantasies. New York: Pantheon Books. ISBN 978-0-394-73994-6.
- Roberts, Moss; Laozi (2001). Dao de jing: the book of the way. Berkeley: University of California Press. ISBN 978-0-520-20555-0.
- Luo, Guanzhong (2020). Three kingdoms: a historical novel. Translated by Roberts, Moss. John S. Service. Berkeley, CA: University of California Press. ISBN 978-0-520-22478-0.
- Roberts, Moss (2020). The Analects: Conclusions and Conversations of Confucius (1 ed.). University of California Press. doi:10.2307/j.ctv1h0nvg3. ISBN 978-0-520-34329-0. JSTOR j.ctv1h0nvg3.
- Roberts, Moss (January 29, 2023). Twilight of the Empires, Volume Four: A Century of War in Asia: Colonies become Nation-States. p. 278.
- Roberts, Moss (January 12, 2021). A Journey to the East: From Brooklyn 1945 to China ca. 500 BCE. Amazon Digital Services LLC - Kdp. p. 107. ISBN 979-8583590452.
- Roberts, Moss (March 20, 2024). Bad Karma: Rethinking Washington's Wars in Asia. p. 339. ISBN 979-8878113632.
- Roberts, Moss (2024-04-02). "Revisiting the CIA's Deceptions in Asia: Cold War Deception: The Asia Foundation and the CIA, David H. Price, (University of Washington Press 2024, 358 pages, ISBN: 9780295752242, $32.00 Paperback)". Critical Asian Studies. 56 (2): 315–319. doi:10.1080/14672715.2024.2335260. ISSN 1467-2715.
