= Richard C. Kagan =

American historian and activist (born 1938)

Richard C. Kagan (born June 24, 1938) is an American professor of East Asian history and a political activist. For over three decades (1973-2005) he taught East Asian history at Hamline University in St. Paul, Minnesota, and currently holds the rank of Professor Emeritus.

== Early life and education ==
Kagan was born in North Hollywood, California, to Jewish immigrant parents from Ukraine and Poland. His undergraduate and master's degrees were awarded from the University of California Berkeley. He received his PhD from the University of Pennsylvania in 1969.

== Scholarship ==
Kagan was a founding member of the Committee of Concerned Asian Scholars (CCAS) and sat on the editorial board of its peer-reviewed quarterly journal, the Bulletin of Concerned Asian Scholars (BCAS), with Noam Chomsky, Herbert Bix, Mark Selden, John W. Dower.

Kagan's unpublished PhD dissertation on Chen Duxiu and Chinese Trotskyism addresses culture, revolution and polity in early 20th century China. The work was among the first to reference Antonio Gramsci's theoretical contributions to comprehending the political economy of revolutionary China.

In 1972, Kagan supervised and wrote the Introduction for the republication of Ross Koen's The China Lobby in American Politics. The book had been accepted, set in print, but then withdrawn from distribution under pressure from supporters of the Nationalist Government in Taiwan. Warren Cohen 's review of the republication notes that Kagan as a founder of CCAS was committed to scholar's engagement with political public life, and agreed with Kagan that there was no active Left in the 1950s to counter the pressure on China policy from the right.

== Taiwan independence ==
Kagan lived in and studied Chinese language in the Republic of China (Taiwan) from 1965 to 1967, and this initial experience served as the springboard for a lifelong commitment to civil and political rights in Taiwan. Kagan has said his interest in Taiwan's democracy movement grew out of his own Jewish heritage's emphasis on human rights and freedom, as well as his experience in the American civil rights movement. Among Kagan's published materials on Taiwan are two biographies of Taiwanese leaders Lee Deng-hui and Chen Shui-bian. One reviewer called the biography of Lee an "important contribution to the study of Taiwan's political development in the last 25 years." Another reviewer, however felt that Kagan's approach to Lee was "hagiographical,"

Kagan's first trip to the People's Republic of China was in January 1975. and since then he has traveled frequently to both mainland China and Taiwan. Kagan testified before the House Sub-Committee on Foreign Affairs in 1980 regarding human rights in Taiwan.

In August 2002, Kagan met with Taiwanese Vice President Annette Lu in Taipei while leading a group of Hamline University students on a fact-finding trip on Taiwan's human rights progress; Lu thanked him for his long-standing advocacy on the issue.

== Selected works ==
- Kagan, Richard C. (1969). PhD Dissertation, Univ. of Pennsylvania. The Chinese Trotskyist Movement and Ch’en Tu-Hsiu: Culture, Revolution and Polity, with an appended translation of Ch’en Tu-hsiu's Autobiography. 243 pages.
- ——— (1972). "Ch'en Tu-Hsiu's Unfinished Autobiography". The China Quarterly. 50 (50): 295–314. doi:10.1017/S0305741000050323. S2CID 155048443.
- Kagan, Richard C. (1972). Ch'en Tu-Hsiu's Unfinished Autobiography. The China Quarterly, Vol. 50, April 1972, pp. 295–314.
- ——— (1973). "Father, Son and the Holy Ghost: Pye, Solomon, and the "Spirit of Chinese Politics"". Bulletin of Concerned Asian Scholars. 5 (1): 62–68. doi:10.1080/14672715.1973.10406324.
- Koen, Ross Y., with Introduction by Richard C. Kagan (1974). The China Lobby in American Politics.
- Chan, F. Gilbert (1976), with contribution by Kagan, Richard. C. China in the 1920s: Nationalism and Revolution (A History of Modern China).
- ——— (2000). "(Review article) Disarming Memories: Japanese, Korean, and American Literature on the Vietnam War". Bulletin of Concerned Asian Scholars. 32 (4): 25–32. doi:10.1080/14672715.2000.10419541. S2CID 147579710.
- Kagan, Richard C. (2000). Chen Shui-bian: Building a Community and a Nation. Paperback 296 pages. Published by Asia-Pacific Academic Exchange Program.
- Kagan, Richard C. (2007). Taiwan's Statesman: Lee Teng-hui and Democracy in Asia. 240 pages. Naval Institute Press.
- —— (2012), "Multiple Chinas, Multiple Americas", in Liu, Kin-ming (ed.), My First Trip to China: Scholars, Diplomats and Journalists Reflect on their First Encounters with China, East Slope Publishing Limited
- ——— (2018). "Your Trip to China Is Canceled: A Remembrance". Critical Asian Studies. 50 (2): 310–316. doi:10.1080/14672715.2018.1450157. S2CID 148960563.

== Presentations ==
- Kagan, Richard C. (1980). Presentation to the House Sub-Committee of Foreign Affairs
- If the United States intends to focus more on Asia, Taiwan's a good place to start, Minnesota Public Radio News. Mprnews.org. Retrieved 2016-03-03.
