= A. Tom Grunfeld =

American academic

Tom Grunfeld
- Born: Adalbert Tomasz Grunfeld

Academic background
- Thesis: Friends of the Revolution: American Supporters of China's Communists, 1926–1939 (1985)

Academic work
- Discipline: Modern History
- Sub-discipline: East Asia (China, Tibet)

Adalbert Tomasz Grunfeld is a Canadian sinologist, who works as a professor of history at Empire State College of the State University of New York. He specializes in the modern history of East Asia, including China, Vietnam and Japan, and recognized as a SUNY Distinguished Teaching Professor. He is widely sought as a commentator on the relationship between China, Tibet and the US.

== Early life and education ==
A. Tom Grunfeld received his BA degree from the State University of New York at Old Westbury in 1972, an MA degree in Chinese history from the School of Oriental and African Studies in 1973, and a PhD in modern Chinese history from New York University in 1985.

== Career ==
Grunfeld has been asked to comment on current Chinese and Tibetan affairs for the BBC and CNN International.

Grunfeld has been a member of the US–China Peoples Friendship Association and a staff member and contributor to its journal New China, as well as a member of the Committee of Concerned Asian Scholars and contributor to its publication, Bulletin of Concerned Asian Scholars (now Critical Asian Studies).

== Reception ==
John Powers writes that Chinese and Tibetan writers attack each other in emotional language, and that the two sides "stake out extreme and uncompromising positions." Tibetan authors impugn Grunfeld's integrity and his authority to write. Powers classifies Grunfeld and Israel Epstein among those who "enthusiastically endorse the Chinese version of events and use much the same language as do Chinese writers to describe conditions in Tibet prior to the 1950s." Grunfeld, continues Powers, paints a picture of a "brutal, exploitative, and primitive society," one that was stratified into a nobility living in opulence while the majority of the people were serfs and slaves. Others agree the reactions are politicized. Those opposing Chinese entrance into Tibet, writes T. Neuhaus, sometimes emphasized "deeper" knowledge rather than fact gathering, and accused Grunfeld and Melvyn Goldstein saying that "they should know better" than to criticize pre-1950s Tibet for being a feudal society.

Reviewing the second edition of The Making of Tibet in the China Quarterly Philip Denwood wrote that Grunfeld gathered material from "diverse and uneven mass of largely secondary material," none in Chinese or Tibetan, and that he "weaves his chronological account with skill." Denwood noted that Grunfeld "seems to have no particular axe to grind or thesis to defend and is at pains to distance himself from the apologists for both Tibet and China, particularly the former." He concludes that "the book should certainly be on the standard list for both the academic and the general reader interested in its subject."

According to Jamyang Norbu, Grunfeld speaks neither Chinese nor Tibetan, and used neither Tibetan nor Chinese sources in his book.

Grunfeld has been drawn into other controversies. Regarding American journalist Edgar Snow (1905–1972), Grunfeld has concluded that he was not a Communist Party member, although he was sympathetic:

Having read through several decades (1920s-1960s) of Snow's diaries, countless pages of correspondence, his FBI file, two biographies, at least one MA thesis and countless articles leads me to believe he was not a member of the CPUSA... That he was sympathetic to some of their ideas and activities is, to my mind, beyond doubt.

== Awards ==
Grunfeld has received awards funding travel and research from the National Endowment for the Humanities (1984), the Research Foundation of City University of New York (1985), the State University of New York, and the Ford Foundation (1993). He has also been a Fulbright Senior Scholar (2009).

== Works ==
Grunfeld wrote his doctoral dissertation on "Friends of the Revolution: American Supporters of China's Communists, 1926–1939" (New York: University Microfilms International: 1985).

Books: Books written, edited, or co-written or co-edited include:

- The Making of Modern Tibet (1987, 1996, 2015)
- On Her Own: Journalistic Adventures from the San Francisco Earthquake to the Chinese Revolution, 1917-1927 (1993, 2017)
- World Civilizations: Sources, Images and Interpretations, Volume 1 (1998, 2001, 2005)
- World Civilizations: Sources, Images and Interpretations, Volume 2 (1998, 2001, 2005)
- The Vietnam War: A History in Documents (2002, 2003)

Articles: Articles published include:

- "Roof of the World / A Review Essay" Bulletin of Concerned Asian Scholars (1977)
- "'God We Had Fun': The CIA in China and Sino-American Relations," Critical Asian Studies (2003)
- "Reassessing Tibet Policy" Institute for Policy Studies (2005)
- "Film Reviews: Round Eyes in the Middle Kingdom and They Chose China," Critical Asian Studies (2009)
- "Review: Foreigners and Foreign Institutions in Republican China," Journal of Contemporary Asia (2014)
- Grunfeld, A. Tom (1997). "Demystifying Tibet: Unlocking the Secrets of the Land of the Snows". H-Net: Humanities & Social Sciences Online.
- "Tibet and the United States," Contemporary Tibet: Politics, Development and Society in a Disputed Region (2017)

== Sources and further reading ==
- Empire State College: bio
- "Tibetan-Chinese Relations—an EAA Interview with A. Tom Grunfeld," Education About Asia 14.2 (Fall 2009)
- Ingram, Paul O. Tibet, the facts (1990) Tibetan Young Buddhist Association
- Joes, Anthony James. Resisting rebellion: the history and politics of counterinsurgency (2006) University Press of Kentucky. ISBN 0-8131-9170-X
- Neuhaus, T. (2012), Tibet in the Western Imagination, Springer, ISBN 978-1-137-26483-1
- Powers, John (2004). History As Propaganda: Tibetan Exiles versus the People's Republic of China. Oxford University Press. p. 19. ISBN 978-0-19-988397-4.
- Sherman, Grunfeld, Markowitz, Rosner, and Heywood. World Civilization: Sources, Images and Interpretations Volume II, 3rd ed. (2001) McGraw-Hill. ISBN 0-07-241825-7
- A. Tom Grunfeld WorldCat.
