= Antonia Finnane =

Australian historian specialising in Chinese history

Antonia Finnane FAHA (born 11 December 1952) is professor of Chinese History at the University of Melbourne. Her research interests have been in migration from China to Australia, particularly by Jewish refugees and in urban and cultural change in China, concentrating on consumption and clothing. Finnane retired from her teaching position at the end of 2018 following a career spanning 33 years.

== Education ==
Sydney-born Finnane graduated from the University of Sydney with a BA (Hons I) and the University Medal in History. She moved to Canberra, where she undertook a PhD at the Australian National University, interrupting her candidacy for study in China at the Beijing Language Institute and Nanjing University, in the years 1976-7. Her PhD thesis, submitted in 1985, was "Prosperity and Decline under the Qing: Yangzhou and its hinterland, 1644–1810".

== Career ==
Finnane has been awarded grants by the Australian Research Council for three Discovery projects: "Consumption in Late Imperial China", "Fashionable times" and "The fate of the artisan in revolutionary China: tailors in Beijing, 1930s–1960s". Her work has also been funded by two University of Melbourne grants, one in which she compared luxury in Renaissance Italy with Ming China and the second a study of "Memory and Commemoration in Asia and the West".

Finnane has contributed articles to many journals, including The Journal of Asian Studies, Asian Studies Review, Journal of Economic and Social History of the Orient, Modern China and The China Quarterly.

== Works ==
=== As author ===
- Finnane, Antonia (1999), Far from where?: Jewish journeys from Shanghai to Australia, Melbourne University Press, ISBN 978-0-522-84846-5
- Finnane, Antonia (2004), Speaking of Yangzhou: A Chinese city, 1550–1850, Harvard University Press, ISBN 978-0-674-01392-6
- Finnane, Antonia (2007), Changing Clothes in China: Fashion, history, nation, Sydney: University of New South Wales Press, ISBN 978-0-86840-895-8
- Finnane, Antonia (2023), How to Make a Mao Suit： Clothing the people of Communist China, 1949-1976, Cambridge: Cambridge University Press, ISBN 9781009360005

=== As editor ===
- Finnane, Antonia; McLaren, Anne E., eds. (1999), Dress, sex and text in Chinese culture, Monash Asia Institute, ISBN 978-0-7326-1174-3
- Finnane, Antonia; McDougall, Derek, eds. (2010), Bandung 1955: Little histories, Monash University Press, ISBN 978-1-876924-73-7

== Awards and recognition ==
- 2006 Joseph Levenson Book Prize for a work on pre-1900 China, for Speaking of Yangzhou: A Chinese city, 1550–1850
- Woodward Medal in Humanities and Social Sciences, University of Melbourne, 2007
- Elected Fellow of the Australian Academy of the Humanities (FAHA), 2008
