= Mark Selden =

American academic (born 1938)

Mark Selden (born 1938) is a coordinator of the open-access journal The Asia-Pacific Journal: Japan Focus, a senior research associate in the East Asia Program at Cornell University, and Bartle Professor of History and Sociology at Binghamton University. He graduated from Amherst College with a major in American Studies and completed a Ph.D. at Yale University in modern Chinese history. He was a founding member of the Committee of Concerned Asian Scholars in the 1960s and for more than thirty years served on the board of editors of The Bulletin of Concerned Asian Scholars (later Critical Asian Studies). He is also the editor of book series at Rowman & Littlefield, Routledge, and M.E. Sharpe publishers.

== Bibliography ==
A specialist on the modern and contemporary geopolitics, political economy and history of China, Japan and the Asia Pacific, his work has addressed themes of war and revolution, inequality, development, regional and world social change, and historical memory.

Selden's works include:

- A Chinese Rebel Beyond the Great Wall: The Cultural Revolution and Ethnic Pogrom in Inner Mongolia, co-authored with TJ Cheng and Uradyn E. Bulag. 2023.
- Dying for an iPhone: Apple, Foxconn and the Lives of China's Workers, co-authored with Jenny Chan and Pun Ngai. 2020.
- Chinese Society: Change, Conflict and Resistance co-edited with Elizabeth J. Perry, 2009 (3rd edition).
- China, East Asia and the Global Economy co-authored with Takeshi Hamashita and Linda Grove, 2008.
- Revolution, Resistance and Reform in Village China co-authored with Edward Friedman and Paul Pickowicz, 2007.
- War and State Terrorism: The United States, Japan, and the Asia-Pacific in the Long Twentieth Century co-authored with Alvin Y. So, 2003.
- The Resurgence of East Asia: 500, 150 and 50 Year Perspectives] co-edited with Giovanni Arrighi and Takeshi Hamashita, 2003.
- Censoring History: Citizenship and Memory in Japan, China and the United States co-edited with Laura Hein, 2000. ISBN 978-0-7656-0447-7
- The Atomic Bomb: Voices From Hiroshima and Nagasaki Co-edited with Kyoko Selden and Robert J. Lifton, 1997.
- China in Revolution: The Yenan Way Revisited, 1995 (2nd edition), ISBN 978-1-56324-555-8
- Chinese Village: Socialist State co-authored with Edward Friedman and Paul Pickowicz, 1993. ISBN 978-0-300-05428-6. Winner of the Joseph Levenson Book Prize for 1993.
- The Yenan Way in Revolutionary China, 1971.

== Personal life ==
Mark Selden was married to Japanese-born scholar and translator Kyoko Iriye Selden (1936–2013) until her death. They had three children.
