= David Strand =

- Education: Lawrence University; Columbia University
- Scientific career
- Fields: History, Political Science
- Workplaces: Dickinson College
- Academic advisors: Andrew Nathan

David Strand is a specialist in the history and political culture of modern China. He is Professor of Political Science at Dickinson College in Carlisle, Pennsylvania, where he holds the Charles A Dana chair.

== Career ==
Strand completed his undergraduate work at Lawrence University (BA 1971), and received his graduate degrees from Columbia University (MA 1973, M.Phil. 1974, PhD 1979). He holds the position of Charles A Dana Professor of Political Science and is the current chair of the East Asian Studies Department at Dickinson College. Strand's research interests include 20th century China, particularly Beijing. He is the author of An Unfinished Republic: Leading by Word and Deed in Modern China and Rickshaw Beijing: City People and Politics in the 1920s, which won the Joseph Levenson Book Prize for 1991. He teaches courses on the history of China and Japan, as well as other courses such as Human Rights, Four Chinese Cities, East Asian Senior Research in the East Asian Studies and Political Science departments.
