= Marilyn B. Young =

American historian (1937–2017)

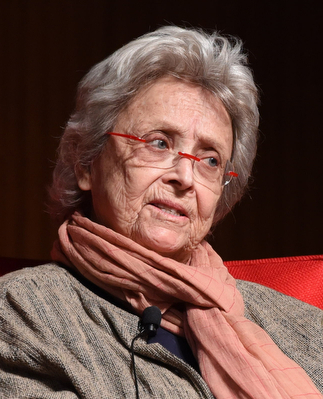
- Born: April 25, 1937; Brooklyn, New York, U.S.
- Died: February 19, 2017 (aged 79); New York, U.S.

Marilyn Blatt Young (April 25, 1937 – February 19, 2017) was a historian of American foreign relations and professor of history at New York University.

She graduated from Samuel J. Tilden High School in Brooklyn in 1953 and Vassar College in 1957. Her doctoral work at Harvard University was supported by an anonymous full scholarship to learn Chinese and to pursue research in the field of United States relations with East Asia. She did her doctoral work under the direction of Ernest R. May, a scholar of American foreign relations, and John King Fairbank, an historian of China. Her doctoral dissertation became her first book, The Rhetoric of Empire: American China Policy, 1895–1901, which examined the American Open Door Notes and the international diplomacy of the Boxer Uprising. She taught at University of Michigan, Ann Arbor, before moving to NYU in 1980.

In 2000–01 she was awarded a Guggenheim Fellowship and an American Council of Learned Societies Fellowship, and the Berkshire Women's History Prize for The Vietnam Wars, 1945–1990. She was elected President of the Society for Historians of American Foreign Relations in 2011.

== Scholarly and political career ==
In the late 1960s, as part of her opposition to the American war in Vietnam, she was a founding member of the Committee of Concerned Asian Scholars. Many of her subsequent writings concerned this and following American wars. She recalled in her presidential address to the Society for Historians of American Foreign Relations:

I find that I have spent most of my life as a teacher and scholar thinking and writing about war. I moved from war to war, from the War of 1898 and U.S. participation in the Boxer Expedition and the Chinese civil war, to the Vietnam War, back to the Korean War, then further back to World War II and forward to the wars of the twentieth and early twenty-first centuries. Initially, I wrote about all these as if war and peace were discrete: prewar, war, peace, or postwar. Over time, this progression of wars has looked to me less like a progression than a continuation: as if between one war and the next, the country was on hold.

Of the Iraq War, she wrote: "If Vietnam was Korea in slow motion, then Operation Iraqi Freedom is Vietnam on crack cocaine. In less than two weeks a 30-year-old vocabulary is back: credibility gap, seek and destroy, hard to tell friend from foe, civilian interference in military affairs, the dominance of domestic politics, winning, or more often, losing hearts and minds."

Young joined the faculty at NYU in 1980. Young founded the Women Studies Department at NYU and, from 1993 to 1996, she was the chairwoman of its history department. Young was a co-director of the Tamiment Library's Center for the United States and the Cold War. She became president of the Society for Historians of American Foreign Relations in 2011.

While in graduate school she met and married Ernest P. Young, an historian of China described by a friend as her "early intellectual companion." They separated and then divorced in 1986.

== Selected publications ==
For a fuller list, see Rebecca Karl, "In Memoriam."

=== Books ===
- The Vietnam Wars, 1945–1990. (Harper Collins 1991), ISBN 0060165537.
- with William G. Rosenberg, Transforming Russia and China: Revolutionary Struggle in the Twentieth Century (Oxford University Press, 1982), ISBN 0195029666.
- Women in China: Studies in Social Change and Feminism. (Center for Chinese Studies, 1973), ISBN 0892640154.
- The Rhetoric of Empire: America China Policy, 1895–1901. (Harvard University Press, 1968), ISBN 0196265223.

=== Edited books ===
- with Y. Tanaka, Bombing Civilians: a 20th century history, (The New Press, 2009).
- with Mark Bradley, Making Sense of the Vietnam War, (Oxford University Press, 2008).
- with Lloyd Gardner, Iraq and the Lessons of Vietnam, The New Press, 2007.
- with Lloyd Gardner, The New American Empire, The New Press, 2005.
- with Tom Grunfeld and John Fitzgerald, The Vietnam War: A History in Documents, OUP, 2003.
- with Robert Buzzanco, Companion to the Vietnam War, Blackwell, 2002.
- edited with Lynn Hunt and Jeffrey Wasserstrom, Human Rights and Revolutions, (Rowman & Littlefield, 2000), ISBN 0847687376
  - 2nd edition (2007) with same editors and Greg Grandin, ISBN 0742555135
- Editorial Committee, Reporting Vietnam:American Journalism, 1959–1975, two volumes, Library of America, 1998.
- with Marvin Gettleman, Jane Franklin and Bruce Franklin, Vietnam and America, Grove Press, 1985; rev. edition Anchor Books, 1995.
- with Rayna Rapp and Sonia Kruks, Promissory Notes: Women and the Transition to Socialism, Monthly Review Press, 1983.
- American Expansionism: the Critical Issues, Little Brown, 1973, edited collection

=== Articles ===
- "The Korean War: Ambivalence on the Silver Screen," in The Korean War at Fifty: International Perspectives, edited by Mark F. Wilkinson (John Adams Center for Military History and Strategic Analysis, 2004).
- "In the Combat Zone," reprinted in Hollywood and War: The Film Reader, edited by J. David Slocum (NY/London; Routledge, 2006).
- "Two, Three, Many Vietnams," Cold War Studies, November 2006.
- "The Vietnam Laugh Track," in David Ryan, ed. Iraq in Vietnam (London: Routledge, 2006)
- "’Shared Victory,’ Korea, the U.S. and France," in The First Vietnam War: Colonial Conflict and Cold War Crisis, ed. Mark Atwood Lawrence and Fredrik Logevall. (Cambridge, MA: Harvard University Press, 2006).
- "The American Empire at War," in The Barbarization of Warfare, edited by George Kassimeris (London: Routledge/NY: NYU Press, 2006).
- "Counterinsurgency, Now and Forever," in Gardner and Young, Iraq and the Lessons of Vietnam
- "Why Vietnam Still Matters," in The War That Never Ends, edited by John Ernst and David Anderson (University Press of Kentucky), 2007.

== References and further reading ==
- Lanza, Fabio (2017). The End of Concern: Maoist China, Activism, and Asian Studies. Durham: Duke University Press. ISBN 9780822369325.
- Dudziak, Mary L. (1 May 2017), "In Memoriam: Marilyn B. Young | (1937-2017", Perspectives on History
- Karl, Rebecca (2017), "In Memoriam: The Many Legacies of Marilyn Young", H-Net Book Channel
