= Susan Naquin =

American historian

- Occupation: Historian

Academic background
- Education: BA., History; MA., East Asian Studies; Ph.D., History
- Alma mater: Stanford University; Yale University
- Thesis: Millenarian Rebellion in China: The Eight Trigrams Uprising of 1813 (1974)

Academic work
- Institutions: University of Pennsylvania; Princeton University

Susan Naquin is an American historian. She is a professor emerita at Princeton University.

Naquin's research centers on the social and cultural history of late imperial and early modern China (1400-1900), focusing on topics such as millenarian peasant uprisings, families, rituals, pilgrimages, temples, the history of Beijing, and Qing material culture. She has authored and co-authored research articles and five books including Millenarian Rebellion in China: The Eight Trigrams Uprising of 1813, Shantung Rebellion: The Wang Lun Uprising of 1774, Chinese Society in the Eighteenth Century, Peking: Temples and City Life, 1400-1900 and Gods of Mount Tai: Familiarity and the Material Culture of North China, 1000-2000 and is a co-editor of the book Pilgrims and Sacred Sites in China. She is the recipient of Princeton University's 2009 Graduate Mentoring Award and the 2010 American Historical Association Award for Scholarly Distinction.

Naquin is an elected member of the American Philosophical Society and the American Academy of Arts and Sciences.

== Education ==
Naquin earned a bachelor's degree in History from Stanford University in 1966, a master's degree in East Asian Studies in 1968 and a Ph.D. in history in 1974, both from Yale University.

== Career ==
Naquin began her academic career as an assistant professor of history at the University of Pennsylvania in 1977, and was promoted to associate professor in 1981 and professor in 1988. In 1993, she joined Princeton University as a professor of History and East Asian Studies and has been professor emerita since 2013.

Between 1978 and 1984, Naquin was a co-editor of the journal Ch’ing-shih wen-t’i 清史問題 (now called Late Imperial China). In 2012, she joined the Elling Eide Foundation Board of Directors, concurrently serving on the Geiss-Hsu Foundation Board of Trustees until 2018.

Naquin was a Faculty Fellow of Princeton University's Society of Fellows from 2000 to 2003, while serving as the Chair of the East Asian Studies Department from 2001 to 2005 and as Acting Chair in 2007.

== Research ==
Naquin has contributed to the field of history by studying the social and cultural life of late imperial and early modern China, especially north China, including millenarian peasant uprisings, sectarian organizations, pilgrimage and temple organizations, the history of Beijing, and the material culture of the Qing dynasty. Her source material has included Qing archives, stone stele, local histories, and religious paraphernalia.

== Works ==
Naquin has authored five books, focusing on Chinese history, especially the religious and cultural practices of imperial China from 1400 to 1900. Her work has been translated into Chinese under her Chinese name, Han Shurui 韓書瑞. In her books Millenarian Rebellion in China: The Eight Trigrams Uprising of 1813 and Shantung Rebellion: The Wang Lun Uprising of 1774, she used newly accessible Qing dynasty archives, including testimonies from captured rebels, to analyze sectarian networks, millenarian beliefs, and how they led to violence in 1813 and 1774. In his review of the book for The Historian, Robert Kapp wrote, "With the aid of this extraordinary material, she has constructed an absorbing narrative not only of the founding of the rebel movement and the planning of the uprising but also of the attack on the Forbidden City...".

In the book Chinese Society in the Eighteenth Century, Naquin and her co-author Evelyn S. Rawski took a regional approach to China. They highlighted the increasing commercial activity and economic development in the 18th century. In 2000, she published Peking: Temples and City Life, 1400-1900, a study of the function of religious institutions as important public spaces in the capital city and city life. About this book, Michael Dillon remarked, "A book of extraordinary complexity and comprehensiveness that contains insights on all aspects of the life of the city... This monumental memorial to the monuments of imperial Peking will become a standard text." In addition, she co-edited the book Pilgrims and Sacred Sites in China with Chün-fang Yü, which was a collection of essays on sacred sites in imperial and modern China. Robert Ford reviewed the book for the Journal of Asian Studies and commented, "This collection of nine essays, prefaced by a substantial introduction by the editors, is the most important and broad-ranging book on its subject ever published." Her 2022 work, Gods of Mount Tai: Familiarity and the Material Culture of North China, 1000-2000 was an exploration of the transformations of the Lady of Mount Tai, North China's most important female deity, through a visual history of overlooked statues, prints, murals, and paintings. In a review published in the Journal of Chinese Religions, Vincent Goossaert wrote "Naquin's book, in the making for some fifteen years and long awaited by the scholarly community, is as towering, rock-solid, impressive, and memorable as its subject."

=== Religious history ===
Naquin has explored many facets of the religious history of imperial China, particularly during the Qing dynasty. In books and articles, she discussed the emergence and endurance of the White Lotus religion, a sect that originated from Buddhist and Daoist traditions in 16th-century China, with a primary focus on its central figure, the Eternal Mother, and its growth over the subsequent four centuries. In addition, she demonstrated how the rebellions in North China in the Qing dynasty were connected and stemmed from this White Lotus religion. Using media from the 17th to the 20th century, she also showed how the Tanzhe Monastery and Mount Miaofeng in Beijing's suburbs, each sustained a local reputation through their history, pilgrims, and landscapes.

=== Imperial China history ===
Naquin has also studied late imperial China, especially the Qing dynasty. In an article in the Harvard Journal of Asiatic Studies, jointly written with Thomas Shiyu Li, Naquin researched the historical significance of Beijing's Baoming temple in terms of both the religion and court politics of Ming and Qing China. She has written on collectors and collecting, and in 2004 she examined how the Palace Museum in Beijing presented itself and its collections as "treasures of the Forbidden City" in exhibitions sent abroad, and helped shape the global understanding of Chinese art and history.

=== Material culture of the Qing dynasty ===
Naquin's research has provided insights into the material culture and artisanal technologies of late imperial China. She highlighted the significance of non-luxury material culture in the Ming and Qing periods, particularly that of the Greater North China Plain, and advocated for a regional perspective as a frame for lesser-known sources. Additionally, in a book chapter, she analyzed the technologies behind temple culture in late imperial China, focusing on the town of Shouzhou in northern Anhui province, and argued that temples were not only social centers, but also required a complex assemblage of technologies to construct and maintain.

== Awards ==
- 1991 – Fellowship Award, John Simon Guggenheim Memorial Foundation
- 2008 – Fellow, American Philosophical Society
- 2009 – Graduate Mentoring Award, Princeton University
- 2010 – Scholarly Distinction Award, American Historical Association
- 2014 – Fellow, American Academy of Arts and Sciences
- 2024 – Recipient, Joseph Levenson Prize, Association for Asian Studies

== Bibliography ==
=== Books ===
- Millenarian Rebellion in China: The Eight Trigrams Uprising of 1813 (1976) ISBN 9780300018936
- Shantung Rebellion: The Wang Lun Uprising of 1774 (1981) ISBN 9780300026382
- Chinese Society in the Eighteenth Century (1987) ISBN 9780300046021
- Pilgrims and Sacred Sites in China (1992) ISBN 9780520075672
- Peking: Temples and City Life, 1400-1900 (2000) ISBN 9780520219915
- Gods of Mount Tai: Familiarity and the Material Culture of North China, 1000-2000 (2022) ISBN 9789004504257

=== Selected articles ===
- Li, Thomas Shiyu; Naquin, Susan (1988). "The Baoming Temple: Religion and The Throne in Ming and Qing China". Harvard Journal of Asiatic Studies. 48 (1): 131–188. doi:10.2307/2719275. JSTOR 2719275.
- Naquin, S. (1992). The Peking pilgrimage to Miao-feng Shan: Religious organizations and sacred site. Pilgrims and sacred sites in China, 333–377.
- Naquin, S. (1998). Sites, saints, and sights at the Tanzhe Monastery. Cahiers d'Extrême-Asie, 183–211.
- Naquin, S. (2004). The Forbidden City goes abroad: Qing history and the foreign exhibitions of the Palace Museum, 1974–2004. T'oung Pao, 341–397.
- Naquin, Susan (2015). "Paul Houo 霍明志, A Dealer in Antiquities in Early Twentieth Century Peking". Études chinoises. 34 (2): 203–244. doi:10.3406/etchi.2015.1551. S2CID 193548319.
- Naquin, Susan (July 2019). "The Material Manifestations of Regional Culture". Journal of Chinese History. 3 (2): 363–379. doi:10.1017/jch.2018.35. S2CID 134438122.
