= Stalin and Mao =

2014 nonfiction book by Lucien Bianco

First edition

Stalin and Mao: A Comparison of the Russian and Chinese Revolutions (French: La récidive: Révolution russe, révolution chinoise) is a non-fiction book by Lucien Bianco, published by Gallimard in 2014. Its 2018 English translation, done by Krystyna Horko, was published by the Chinese University of Hong Kong Press. It compares and contrasts the Russian Revolution and the Chinese Communist Revolution.

The English title refers to Joseph Stalin and Mao Zedong while the French title is "La récidive", that is, "recidivist, or “repeat offender,” which refers to the central argument that Mao's seizure of power and revolutionary regime repeats the crimes of Stalin's.

== Contents ==
The book has nine chapters, which each cover a different topic. The bibliography has a total of 28 pages. The book focuses on particular points common to both revolutions and does not intend to have comprehensive coverage of the two revolutions.

David Wolff, in Slavic Review described the work as "a solid diatribe against both Stalin and Mao". Bianco argues that Deng Xiaoping could have found success under Stalin's regime, in a manner that Wolff describes as "Some small gratitude" for Deng. Bianco argues that Mao had no role in China's economic ascent that occurred after Mao's death.

Steven I. Levine of University of Montana wrote that readers, to derive the most benefit, should have familiarity with the respective topics, noting that "This is not a book for beginners."

=== Chapters ===
"The Laggards," Chapter 1, discusses the origins of the two revolutions.

"Catching Up," Chapter 2, discusses the reasons why Stalin and Mao engaged in their economic programmes.

"Politics," Chapter 3, discusses how Mao modeled his regime after Stalin's.

"The Peasants," Chapter 4, discusses the differences in involvement of peasants in each revolution.

"The Famine," Chapter 5, discusses the Soviet famine of 1930–1933 and the Great Chinese Famine.

"Bureaucracy," Chapter 6, discusses how the Communist regimes of the USSR and China bureaucratized.

"Culture," Chapter 7, discusses similarities and differences in works of art in each country post-revolution.

“The Camps," Chapter 8, discusses Soviet gulags and Chinese laogai.

“The Dictators," Chapter 9, discusses the roles Stalin and Mao had in their respective systems. The English version changed the title of Chapter 9 to "Dictators", when in French it was "monstres" (monsters). Additionally the English title refers to Joseph Stalin and Mao Zedong while the French title starts with "La récidive" (meaning "the recurrence") which refers to the central argument that Mao's seizure of power was patterned off of Stalin's. Igor Iwo Chabrowski, in China Perspectives, argued that the former change was due to Chinese University of Hong Kong trying to find a way to continue publishing works that may be sensitive in its political climate. The text within the chapter describes them as "monsters".

Chabrowski stated that chapters 4 and 5 "provide a core for the argument in the book".

== Release ==
CUHK Press also released a translation of the book in Traditional Chinese, as 歷史的覆轍 Iìshǐ de fùzhé meaning history of a path that resulted in failing. The translator is Xia Peiran (夏沛然 Xià Pèirán).

== Reception ==
Richard Desjardins stated that the book was "tightly written" and praised the "attention to detail".

Westad stated that "Bianco’s book is a good summing up of current knowledge" regarding post-1949 China and the Soviet Union that has a highly accurate "big picture right", despite the lack of information from the newest scholarly endeavours.

Steven Levine stated that the book's contents "powerfully remind us of the system of privilege and power of the new ruling class" in Mao's and Stalin's governance systems.

Marilyn A. Levine of Central Washington University wrote that the author "makes a strong case for his assertions about the growth of authoritarianism".

== See also ==
- Origins of the Chinese Revolution, 1915-1949 - Another book by Bianco
