= Mao's China and After =

Non-fiction book

Mao's China and After: A History of the People's Republic
- Author: Maurice Meisner
- ISBN: 978-0684856353

Mao's China and After: A History of the People's Republic is a book by Maurice Meisner. It is a revision of Mao's China: A History of the People's Republic (1977).

Meisner often found his work needed fundamental revision. The first edition of his book was finished just a few weeks before Mao Zedong's death in 1976. A second edition, published in 1986 as Mao's China and After. The book also analyzed the changes that happened with the reforms of Deng Xiaoping. A third edition, published in 1999, studied the origins and consequences of Chinese capitalism.

Rebecca Karl wrote "[h]aving taught his Mao's China and After, I knew that a theoretically coherent and analytically challenging text was possible to use in the classroom."
