= Elizabeth J. Perry =

American political scientist

- Other name: 裴宜理
- Education: William Smith College (BA), University of Michigan (PhD)
- Occupation: Political scientist
- Employer: Harvard University
- Organization(s): Association for Asian Studies, American Political Science Association
- Awards: Guggenheim Fellowship, John K. Fairbank Prize

Elizabeth J. Perry, (Chinese: 裴宜理; pinyin: Péi Yílǐ; born 9 September 1948) is an American political scientist specialized in and Chinese history and politics. She is the Henry Rosovsky Professor of Government at Harvard University. She is a fellow of the American Academy of Arts and Sciences, a corresponding fellow of the British Academy, a recipient of a Guggenheim Fellowship, and was Director of Harvard's Fairbank Center for East Asian Research from 1999 to 2003 and as president of the Association for Asian Studies in 2007.

== Life and career ==
Perry was born in Shanghai, shortly before the Chinese Communist Revolution, to American missionary parents who were professors at St. John's University. She grew up in Tokyo, Japan in the 1950s and participated in the 1960 Anpo protests against the US-Japan Security Treaty.

She returned to the United States and attended William Smith College, where she earned her B.A. summa cum laude in 1969. In 1978, she received her Ph.D. in political science from the University of Michigan where her dissertation committee included Michel Oksenberg, Norma Diamond, Albert Feuerwerker, and Allen Whiting. Her doctoral thesis explored the tradition of peasant rebellions of the Huaibei region of northern China and the Communist Revolution.

Perry took her first teaching job at the University of Arizona before becoming an assistant, then associate professor at the University of Washington (1978-1990); she then taught at the University of California, Berkeley as Robson Professor of Political Science, 1990-1997 before moving to Harvard.

When China and the US resumed academic exchange in 1979, she spent a year at Nanjing University as a visiting scholar, researching Chinese secret societies under Cai Shaoqing and the Taiping Rebellion under Mao Jiaqi.

In 2007, Perry was named director of the Harvard-Yenching Institute, effective July 1, 2008. In January 2024, James Robson was announced as her successor.

== Scholarship and views ==
Perry's research focuses on the history of the Chinese Communist Revolution and its implications for contemporary politics. Although she earned all her degrees in political science, much of her research focuses on history and its links to contemporary issues. She observes that contemporary China consciously sees itself as an outgrowth of its long history, and Chinese political leaders are keenly aware of history, even if they may misunderstand it. As a result, history is highly consequential in the study of contemporary politics.

She had been sympathetic with the Cultural Revolution as a student, and joined the Committee of Concerned Asian Scholars, a group that opposed American involvement in the Vietnam War. After witnessing the inequality in Communist China and hearing people's personal accounts about their suffering during the period, her views on the Chinese Communist Revolution and Maoism changed fundamentally.

Writing in the 1990s, Perry critiqued the then-prevailing model of analyzing state and society relations in China, contending that "terms such as 'state' and 'society' are simply too gross to capture the enormous variation that differentiates one Chinese region - or level of government - from another."

== Awards ==
Her book, Shanghai on Strike: the Politics of Chinese Labor (1993) won the John K. Fairbank Prize from the American Historical Association. Her article "From Mencius to Mao – and Now: Chinese Conceptions of Socioeconomic Rights" (2008) won the Heinz Eulau Prize from the American Political Science Association. Perry received honorary doctorate degrees from Hobart and William Smith Colleges and from the Hong Kong University of Science and Technology. The Asian Studies Library at her undergraduate alma mater has been named in her honor. She also holds honorary professorships at eight major Chinese universities.

== Publications ==
=== Selected books ===
- Perry, Elizabeth J. (1980), Rebels and Revolutionaries in North China, 1845–1945, Stanford University Press)
- Edited. Chinese Perspectives on the Nien Rebellion (M.E. Sharpe, 1981)
- Edited with Christine Wong. The Political Economy of Reform in Post-Mao China (Harvard, 1985)
- Edited with Jeffrey N Wasserstrom. Popular Protest and Political Culture in Modern China (Westview, 1992)
- Shanghai on Strike (Stanford, 1993)
- Edited with Deborah S. Davis, Richard Kraus and Barry Naughton. Urban Spaces in Contemporary China: The Potential for Autonomy and Community in Chinese Cities (Cambridge, 1995)
- Edited. Putting Class in Its Place: Worker Identities in East Asia (UC Berkeley, 1996)
- With Li Xun. Proletarian Power: Shanghai in the Cultural Revolution (Westview, 1997)
- Edited with Xiaobo Lu. Danwei: The Changing Chinese Workplace in Historical and Comparative Perspective (M.E. Sharpe, 1997)
- Edited with Mark Selden. Chinese Society: Change, Conflict, and Resistance (Routledge, 2000)
- Edited with Ronald R. Aminzade, Jack A. Goldstone, Doug McAdam, William H. Sewell, Sidney Tarrow and Charles Tilley. Silence and Voice in the Study of Contentious Politics (Cambridge, 2001)
- Challenging the Mandate of Heaven: Social Protest and State Power in China (M.E. Sharpe, 2002)
- Edited with Merle Goldman. Changing Meanings of Citizenship in Modern China (Harvard, 2002)
- Patrolling the Revolution: Worker Militias, Citizenship and the Chinese State (Rowman & Littlefield, 2005)
- Edited with Merle Goldman. Grassroots Political Reform in Contemporary China (Harvard, 2007)
- Edited with Sebastian Heilmann. Mao's Invisible Hand: The Political Foundations of Adaptive Governanace in China (Harvard, 2011)
- Anyuan: Mining China's revolutionary tradition (California, 2012)
- Edited. Growing Pains in a Rising China (Daedalus, 2014)
- Edited with Chen Hongmin. What is the Best Kind of History? (Zhejiang, 2015) [in Chinese]
- Edited with Prasenjit Duara. Beyond Regimes: China and India Compared (Harvard, 2018)
- Edited with Chen Hongmin. Similarity Amidst Difference: Christian Colleges in Republican China (Zhejiang, 2019) [in Chinese]
- Edited with Grzegorz Ekiert and Xiaojun Yan, Ruling by Other Means: State-Mobilized Movements (Cambridge University Press, 2020).

=== Selected articles ===
- ——— (2002). "Moving the Masses: Emotion Work in the Chinese Revolution". Mobilization. 7 (2): 111–128. doi:10.17813/maiq.7.2.70rg70l202524uw6. S2CID 145444202.
- ——— (2007). "Studying Chinese Politics: Farewell to Revolution?". The China Journal. 57 (57): 1–22. doi:10.1086/tcj.57.20066239. S2CID 39304031.
- ——— (2008). "Reclaiming the Chinese Revolution". Journal of Asian Studies. 67 (4): 1147–1164. doi:10.1017/S0021911808001733. S2CID 161974847. . Chinese versions in QINGHUA XUEBAO (2012) and in Madeleine Yue Dong, ed., MAJOR WESTERN SCHOLARSHIP ON CHINESE HISTORY (Shanghai, 2010).
- ———; Li, Xun (2003), "Revolutionary Rudeness: The Language of Red Guards and Rebel Workers in China's Cultural Revolution", in Wasserstrom, Jeffrey N. (ed.), Twentieth Century China, London; New York: Routledge
- ——— (2008). "Chinese Conceptions of "Rights": From Mencius to Mao—and Now". Perspectives on Politics. 6 (1): 37–50. doi:10.1017/S1537592708080055. S2CID 145214893.
