= Joseph Levenson Book Prize =

Literary award

Joseph Levenson Book Prize is awarded each year in memory of Joseph R. Levenson by the Association for Asian Studies to two English-language books, one whose main focus is on China before 1900 and the other for works on post-1900 China. According to the association, the prize criterion is whether the book is "the greatest contribution to increasing understanding of the history, culture, society, politics, or economy of China." While the association does not limit the discipline or period of the work, it won't consider anthologies, edited works, and pamphlets. Based on the scholarly interests of Levenson, the association gives special consideration to books that "promote the relevance of scholarship on China to the wider world of intellectual discourse."

== List of awards ==
Year	Category	Recipient	Title	Publisher
1987	Pre-1900	Frederic Wakeman Jr.	The Great Enterprise: The Manchu Reconstruction of Imperial Order in Seventeenth Century China	University of California Press 1985
1987	Post-1900	Andrew J. Nathan	Chinese Democracy	Alfred A. Knopf, 1985
1988	Pre-1900	Robert P. Hymes	Statesmen and Gentlemen : the Elite of Fu-chou, Chiang-hsi, in Northern and Southern Sung	Cambridge University Press 1986
1988	Post-1900	Andrew G. Walder	Communist Neo-traditionalism: Work and Authority in Chinese Industry	University of California Press 1986
1989	Pre-1900	Andrew H. Plaks	The Four Masterworks of the Ming Novel = Ssu Ta Ch'i-shu	Princeton University Press 1987
1989	Pre-1900, Honorable Mention	R. Kent Guy	The Emperor's Four Treasuries: Scholars and the State in the Late Ch'ien-lung Era	Harvard University Press 1987
1989	Post-1900	Joseph W. Esherick	The Origins of the Boxer Uprising	University of California Press 1987
1990	Pre-1900	Patrick Hanan	The Invention of Li yu	Harvard University Press 1988
1990	Pre-1900, Honorable Mention	Jerry Norman	Chinese	Cambridge University Press 1988
1990	Post-1900	Prasenjit Duara	Culture, Power, and the State: Rural North China, 1900-1942	Stanford University Press 1988
1991	Pre-1900	Wu Hung	The Wu Liang Shrine: the Ideology of Early Chinese Pictorial Art	Stanford University Press 1989
1991	Post-1900	David Strand	Rickshaw Beijing: City People and Politics in the 1920s	University of California Press 1989
1991	Post-1900, Honorable Mention	Melvyn C. Goldstein	A History of Modern Tibet, Volume 1: 1913-1951: The Demise of the Lamaist State	University of California Press 1989
1992	Pre-1900	Philip A. Kuhn	Soulstealers: the Chinese Sorcery Scare of 1768	Harvard University Press 1990
1992	Post-1900	Philip C. Huang	The Peasant Family and Rural Development in the Yangzi Delta, 1350-1988	Stanford University Press 1990
1993	Pre-1900	Martin J. Powers	Art & Political Expression in Early China	Yale University Press 1991
1993	Post-1900	Edward Friedman, Paul G. Pickowicz, Mark Selden	Chinese Village, Socialist State	Yale University Press 1991
1994	Pre-1900	Jing Wang	The Story of Stone: Intertextuality, Ancient Chinese Stone Lore, and the Stone Symbolism in Dream of the Red Chamber, Water Margin, and the Journey to the West	Duke University Press 1992
1994	Pre-1900, Honorable Mention	Zhang Longxi	The Tao and the Logos: Literary Hermeneutics, East and West	Duke University Press 1992
1994	Post-1900	Gregor Benton	Mountain Fires: the Red Army's Three-year War in South China, 1934-1938	University of California Press 1992
1995	Pre-1900	Patricia Buckley Ebrey	The Inner Quarters: Marriage and the Lives of Chinese Women in the Sung Period	University of California Press 1993
1995	Post-1900	Vaclav Smil	China's Environmental Crisis: an Inquiry into the Limits of National Development	M. E. Sharpe, 1993
1996	Pre-1900	Stephen F. Teiser	Scripture on the Ten Kings and the Making of Purgatory in Medieval Chinese Buddhism	University of Hawaii Press 1994
1996	Post-1900	Julia Frances Andrews	Painters and Politics in the People's Republic of China, 1949-1979	University of California Press 1994
1997	Pre-1900	James L. Hevia	Cherishing Men from Afar: Qing Guest Ritual and the Macartney Embassy of 1793	Duke University Press 1995
1997	Post-1900	R. Keith Schoppa	Blood Road: the Mystery of Shen Dingyi in Revolutionary China	University of California Press 1995
1998	Pre-1900	Maggie Bickford	Ink Plum: the Making of a Chinese Scholar-painting Genre	Cambridge University Press 1996
1998	Post-1900	John Fitzgerald	Awakening China: Politics, Culture, and Class in the Nationalist Revolution	Stanford University Press 1996
1999	Pre-1900	Susan L. Mann	Precious Records: Women in China's Long Eighteenth Century	Stanford University Press 1997
1999	Post-1900	Roderick MacFarquhar	The Origins of the Cultural Revolution 3: the Coming of the Cataclysm 1961-1966	Columbia University Press 1997
2000	Pre-1900	Timothy Brook	The Confusions of Pleasure: Commerce and Culture in Ming China	University of California Press 1998
2000	Post-1900	Lynn T. White, III	Unstately Power, Vol. II: Local Causes of China's Intellectual, Legal, and Governmental Reforms	M. E. Sharpe, 1998
2001	Pre-1900	Pamela Kyle Crossley	A Translucent Mirror: History and Identity in Qing Imperial Ideology	University of California Press 1999
2001	Post-1900	Dorothy J. Solinger	Contesting Citizenship in Urban China: Peasant Migrants, the State, and the Logic of the Market	University of California Press 1999
2002	Pre-1900	Lothar Ledderose	Ten Thousand Things: Module and Mass Production in Chinese Art	Princeton University Press 2000
2002	Post-1900	Edward J. M. Rhoads	Manchus & Han: Ethnic Relations and Political Power in Late Qing and Early Republican China, 1861-1928	University of Washington Press 2000
2003	Pre-1900	David Schaberg	A Patterned Past: Form and Thought in Early Chinese Historiography	Harvard University Asia Center 2001
2003	Post-1900	Lucien Bianco	Peasants Without the Party: Grass-root Movements in 20th-century China	M.E. Sharpe, 2001
2004	Pre-1900	Robert P. Hymes	Way and Byway: Taoism, Local Religion, and Models of Divinity in Sung and Modern China	University of California Press 2002
2004	Post-1900	Geremie Barmé	An Artistic Exile: a Life of Feng Zikai (1898-1975)	University of California Press 2002
2005	Pre-1900	John Makeham	Transmitters and Creators: Chinese Commentators and Commentaries on the Analects	Harvard University Asia Center 2003
2005	Post-1900	Yunxiang Yan	Private Life under Socialism: Love, Intimacy, and Family Change in a Chinese Village, 1949-1999	Stanford University Press 2003
2006	Pre-1900	Antonia Finnane	Speaking of Yangzhou: a Chinese City, 1550-1850	Harvard University Asia Center 2004
2006	Post-1900	Ruth Rogaski	Hygienic Modernity: Meanings of Health and Disease in Treaty-port China	University of California Press 2004
2007	Pre-1900	Peter C. Perdue	China Marches West: the Qing Conquest of Central Eurasia	Harvard University Press 2005
2007	Post-1900	Michael Dutton	Policing Chinese Politics: a History	Duke University Press 2005
2008	Pre-1900	Martin J. Powers	Pattern and Person: Ornament, Society, and Self in Classical China	Harvard University Asia Center 2006
2008	Post-1900	Sherman Cochran	Chinese Medicine Men: Consumer Culture in China and Southeast Asia	Harvard University Press 2006
2009	Pre-1900	Anthony J. Barbieri-Low	Artisans in Early Imperial China	University of Washington Press 2007
2009	Post-1900	Haiyan Lee	Revolution of the Heart: a Genealogy of Love in China, 1900-1950	Stanford University Press 2007
2010	Pre-1900	Robert E. Harrist	The Landscape of Words: Stone Inscriptions in Early and Medieval China	University of Washington Press 2008
2010	Post-1900	Susan Greenhalgh	Just One Child: Science and Policy in Deng's China	University of California Press 2008
2011	Pre-1900	Eugenio Menegon	Ancestors, Virgins and Friars: Christianity as a Local Religion in Late Imperial China	Harvard University Asia Center 2009
2011	Pre-1900, Honorable Mention	Robert Ford Campany	Making Transcendents: Ascetics and Social Memory in Early Medieval China	University of Hawaii Press 2009
2011	Post-1900	Jacob Eyferth	Eating Rice from Bamboo Roots: the Social History of a Community of Artisans in Southwest China, 1920–2000	Harvard University Asia Center 2009
2012	Pre-1900	Christopher M. B. Nugent	Manifest in Words, Written on Paper: Producing and Circulating Poetry in Tang Dynasty China	Harvard University Asia Center 2010
2012	Post-1900	Yomi Braester	Painting the City Red: Chinese Cinema and the Urban Contract	Duke University Press 2010
2013	Pre-1900	Dagmar Schäfer	The Crafting of 10,000 Things: Knowledge and Technology in Seventeenth Century China	University of Chicago Press 2011
2013	Pre-1900, Honorable Mention	K. E. Brashier	Ancestral Memory in Early China	Harvard University Asia Center 2011
2013	Post-1900	Vincent Goossaert and David A. Palmer	The Religious Question in Modern China	University of Chicago Press 2011
2014	Pre-1900	Andrea Goldman	Opera and the City: the Politics of Culture in Beijing, 1770-1900	Stanford University Press 2012
2014	Pre-1900, Honorable Mention	Scott B. Cook	The Bamboo Texts of Guodian: A Study and Complete Translation (2 volumes)	Cornell East Asia Series 2012
2014	Post-1900	Joseph Allen	Taipei: City of Displacements	University of Washington Press 2012
2015	Pre-1900	Yuming He	Home and the World: Editing the “Glorious Ming” in Woodblock-Printed Books of the Sixteenth and Seventeenth Centuries	Harvard University Asia Center 2013
2015	Pre-1900, Honorable Mention	Matthais L. Richter	The Embodied Text: Establishing Textual Identity in Early Chinese Manuscripts	E J Brill 2013
2015	Post-1900	Winnie Won Yin Wong	Van Gogh on Demand: China and the Readymade	University of Chicago Press 2013
2016	Pre-1900	Wai-yee Li	Women and National Trauma in Late Imperial Chinese Literature	Harvard University Asia Center 2014
2016	Pre-1900, Honorable Mention	Tamara Chin	Savage Exchange: Han Imperialism, Chinese Literary Style, and the Economic Imagination	Harvard University Asia Center 2014
2016	Post-1900	Luigi Tomba	The Government Next Door: Neighborhood Politics in Urban China	Cornell University Press 2014
2017	Pre-1900	Foong Ping	The Efficacious Landscape: On the Authorities of Painting at the Northern Song Court	Harvard University Asia Center 2015
2017	Pre-1900, Honorable Mention	Anna Shields	One Who Knows Me: Friendship and Literary Culture in Mid-Tang China	Harvard University Asia Center 2015
2017	Post-1900	Christopher Rea	The Age of Irreverence: A New History of Laughter in China	University of California Press 2015
2018	Pre-1900	Li Chen	Chinese Law in Imperial Eyes: Sovereignty, Justice, and Transcultural Politics	Columbia University Press 2016
2018	Post-1900	Sigrid Schmalzer	Red Revolution, Green Revolution: Scientific Farming in Socialist China	University of Chicago Press 2016
2019	Pre-1900	Jonathan Schlesinger	A World Trimmed with Fur: Wild Things, Pristine Places, and the Natural Fringes of Qing Rule	Stanford University Press 2017
2019	Pre-1900, Honorable Mention	Craig Clunas	Chinese Painting and Its Audiences	Princeton University Press 2017
2019	Post-1900	Ching Kwan Lee	The Specter of Global China: Politics, Labor, and Foreign Investment in Africa	University of Chicago Press 2017
2019	Post-1900, Honorable Mention	Thomas Mullaney	The Chinese Typewriter: A History	MIT Press 2017
2020	Pre-1900	Lara Blanchard	Song Dynasty Figures of Longing and Desire: Gender and Interiority in Chinese Painting and Poetry	E J Brill 2018
2020	Pre-1900, Honorable Mention	Ori Sela	China's Philological Turn: Scholars, Textualism, and the Dao in the 18th Century	Columbia University Press 2018
2020	Pre-1900, Honorable Mention	Wen-shing Chou	Mount Wutai: Visions of a Sacred Buddhist Mountain	Princeton University Press 2018
2020	Post-1900	Sasha Welland	Experimental Beijing: Gender and Globalization in Chinese Contemporary Art	Duke University Press 2018
2020	Post-1900, Honorable Mention	Gao Hua (trans. by Stacy Mosher and Guo Jian)	How the Red Sun Rose: The Origin and Development of the Yan'an Rectification Movement, 1930–1945	The Chinese University of Hong Kong Press 2018
2021	Pre-1900	Stephen Owen	Just a Song: Chinese Lyrics from the Eleventh and Early Twelfth Centuries	Harvard University Asia Center 2019
2021	Pre-1900, Honorable Mention	Macabe Keliher	The Board of Rites and the Making of Qing China	University of California Press 2019
2021	Pre-1900, Honorable Mention	Charles Sanft	Literate Community in Early Imperial China: The Northwestern Frontier in Han Times	State University of New York Press 2019
2021	Post-1900	Joel Andreas	Disenfranchised: The Rise and Fall of Industrial Citizenship in China	Oxford University Press 2019
2021	Post-1900, Honorable Mention	Yurou Zhong	Chinese Grammatology: Script Revolution and Literary Modernity, 1916–1958	Columbia University Press 2019
2022	Pre-1900	Robert Ford Campany	The Chinese Dreamscape 300BCE-800CE	Harvard University Asia Center 2020
2022	Pre-1900, Honorable Mention	He Bian	Know Your Remedies: Pharmacy and Culture in Early Modern China	Princeton University Press 2020
2022	Post-1900	Silvia M. Lindtner	Prototype Nation: China and the Contested Promise of Innovation	Princeton University Press 2020
2023	Pre-1900	Ruth Mostern	The Yellow River: A Natural and Unnatural History	Yale University Press 2021
2023	Pre-1900, Honorable Mention	Tao Jiang	Origins of Moral-Political Philosophy in Early China	Oxford University Press 2021
2023	Post-1900	Joshua Goldstein	Remains of the Everyday: A Century of Recycling in Beijing	University of California Press 2021
2023	Post-1900, Honorable Mention	Nicole Willock	Lineages of the Literary	Columbia University Press 2021
2024	Pre-1900	Susan Naquin	Gods of Mount Tai: Familiarity and the Material Culture of North China, 1000-2000	Princeton University Press 2022
	Pre-1900, Honorable Mention	Christian de Pee	Urban Life and Intellectual Crisis in Middle-Period China, 800–1100	Amsterdam University Press 2022
	Pre-1900, Honorable Mention	Lawrence Zhang	Power for a Price: The Purchase of Official Appointments in Qing China	Harvard University Asia Center 2022
	Post-1900	Ho-fung Hung	City on the Edge: Hong Kong Under Chinese Rule	Cambridge University Press
	Post-1900, Honorable Mention	Joseph Esherick	Accidental Holy Land: The Communist Revolution in Northwest China	University of California Press
2025	Pre-1900	Xin Wen	The King’s Road: Diplomacy and the Remaking of the Silk Road	Princeton University Press
	Pre-1900, Honorable Mention	Yiwen Li	Networks of Faith and Profit: Monks, Merchants, and Exchanges between China and Japan, 839–1403 CE	Cambridge University Press
	Post-1900	Xiaofei Kang	Enchanted Revolution: Ghosts, Shamans, and Gender Politics in Chinese Communist Propaganda, 1942-1953	Oxford University Press
	Post-1900, Honorable Mention	Jie Li	Cinematic Guerrillas: Propaganda, Projectionists, and Audiences in Socialist China	Columbia University Press
