= Ernest P. Young =

American historian of China

- Education: Harvard University (AB, PhD)
- Occupation: Historian

Ernest P. Young is an American historian who focused his research on the politics and international relations of China in the late 19th and early 20th century China. He taught at the University of Michigan from 1968 to 2002, and became the Richard Hudson Professor of History in 1998.

== Biography ==
Young earned an A.B and PhD in History and Far Eastern Languages at Harvard University in 1965. Young worked as a professor of oriental history at Dartmouth College and as assistant to Edwin O. Reischauer, the US Ambassador to Japan. Young moved to the University of Michigan in 1968, was promoted to professor in 1974, and was appointed the Richard Hudson Professor of History in 1998. He retired in 2002 to become an emeritus professor.

His marriage to foreign policy expert Marilyn B. Young, a professor at New York University, ended in divorce. He later remarried M. Brady Mikusko, a life coach and mediator.

== Academic career ==
Young's publications ranged from Yuan Shikai's presidency to the French imperialist project supporting the Catholic Church in China, and Sino-Japanese relations.

During the Vietnam War, his travel to Japan to interview a group of American anti-war deserters known as "The Intrepid Four" made headlines.

== Works ==
- Young, Ernest P. (1977). The presidency of Yuan Shih-k'ai. University of Michigan Press.
- Lieberthal, Kenneth; Lin, Shuen-fu; Young, Ernest P., eds. (1997). Constructing China: The Interaction of Culture and Economics. University of Michigan Press. ISBN 978-0-89264-121-5.
- Young, Ernest P. (2013). Ecclesiastical Colony: China's Catholic Church and the French Religious Protectorate. Oxford University Press. ISBN 978-0-19-992462-2.

== References and further reading ==
"Memoir: Ernest P. Young", Faculty History Project, University of Michigan, 2011
