= Harvey Goldberg =

American historian

Harvey Goldberg (March 13, 1922 – May 20, 1987) was an American historian and political activist.

== Biography ==
Harvey Goldberg was born in Orange, New Jersey. He earned his bachelor's degree from the University of Wisconsin in 1943. He earned his Ph.D. from the University of Wisconsin in 1951; the subject of his dissertation Jaurès and French foreign policy, was French Socialist leader Jean Jaurès.

A specialist in European social history, Goldberg began his career as a historian at Oberlin College. After three years at Oberlin, Goldberg moved to Ohio State University, where he taught until 1963. His years at Ohio State were marked by extraordinary achievements in both scholarship and teaching. He published widely in journals ranging from The Nation to The International Review of Social History. His books include a biography of the French democratic socialist Jaurès, The Life of Jean Jaurès (1962), which The New York Times referred to as "The definitive biography, as dense with life, character and events as a Balzac novel." Some publications are still only in French, such as his edits with Georges Haupt of the memoirs of Charles Rappoport.

Near the end of his book on Jaurès, Goldberg wrote, "He had the integrity to be partisan, the courage to be revolutionary, the humanism to be tolerant, and the wisdom to evolve...". His Ohio State students recognized and honored those same traits in Goldberg himself, as evidenced by his award as Professor of the Year by the Arts College Student Council in 1959 when he was just 36 years old.

In 1963, University of Wisconsin President Fred Harvey Harrington invited Goldberg to return to Madison. Goldberg was given the freedom to teach as he wished and the liberty to spend every third year in Paris. As a faculty member, Goldberg carried the history department when it came to attracting large student enrollments that drove departmental budgets. He estimated that during his 40-year career he taught some 25,000 students. He also supervised 49 PhDs. Despite his contributions to the department, however, Goldberg never received a teaching award from Wisconsin.

Goldberg taught at the University of Wisconsin from 1963 until illness forced his hospitalization. He died of liver cancer in Madison, Wisconsin on May 20, 1987. He is buried at Madison's Forest Hill Cemetery.

== Lecturer ==
In an era when professors might receive a round of polite applause on the last day of the semester, Goldberg got an ovation at the end of every lecture, which often ran well over the assigned time. He enjoyed a large popular following and inspired many students to engage politically. His lectures are still available from the Goldberg Center at the University of Wisconsin and through the website of the Brecht Forum, footnoted below.

His career as a lecturer began early. "I was just barely 23 when I began to talk and I've been talking ever since," he told an interviewer in 1977. His first lecture was before an ancient history class, when one of his professors "pulled me out of the corridor and into 272 Bascom. After that, everything was an anti-climax."

James K. Sunshine, a 1949 Oberlin graduate recalled that "After the war, a charismatic young history professor named Harvey Goldberg arrived and astonished his classes and much of the campus with incandescent lectures on European economic history. With the Cold War and the civil rights movement heating up, political liberalism and race relations began to dominate conversation, and Goldberg became a leading speaker at “Arch 7” mass meetings held after supper on the steps of the Memorial Arch to protest the latest iniquity in Washington, DC."

Goldberg's classes at Ohio State were frequently standing room only; several of them, including one on the death of Louis XVI and another on the fall of the Bastille, were Ohio State public events. Goldberg taught in front of the lectern without the aid of notes. "I like to think" he said, "that the students and I melt to nothingness before the significance of the materials." He believed a teacher must "undertake to convey a kind of courage. If he's any good, he must live a life that is true and not hypocritical. He can teach the same kind of courage by example."

Goldberg began his lecture career at Madison in the fall of 1963, in a small room that held fewer than 100 students. By the second semester, he had been given a large lecture hall. Eventually, his audiences (both students and auditors) grew so large his lectures were held in the large auditorium of the Agriculture Hall, a venue capable of holding 600-700 people.

No one who witnessed his lectures at Madison could forget the drama of his meticulously crafted performances, delivered with an actor's sense of timing. Goldberg waited in the wings, then approached the podium and paused for a few beats. He would then take off his glasses, look off to the side of the stage as if expecting a cue, and then turn to the audience, waving his finger and declaring, "The point is, you know..." And once he had warmed to his topic, there was no stopping him. Because of Goldberg's reputation for consistently overrunning the 50-minute period, the History Dept. eventually learned to schedule his class in the de facto last slot of the day, 2:25 to 3:15, to minimize students being late for other commitments.

Jazz musician, music scholar and former Goldberg student Ben Sidran likened this performance to jazz: "When he was onstage, he was transformed by the process and the information."

Another former student, independent film and television producer Sidney Iwanter, recalled that "For a quarter of a century, Goldberg's reed thin voice never faltered; he danced out his words from memory, a verbal misstep was as unheard of as a yawn from the audience. He spun rhetorical gold, his oratory soaring over the stellar landscape of the University of Wisconsin History Department, stimulating the standing-room-only crowds to ponder, if only shortly in their undergraduate lives, the march of the common man over that of common stocks."

Fellow history professor at Madison, Maurice Meisner, befriended Goldberg and helped to found the Harvey Goldberg Center for the Study of Contemporary History at the University of Wisconsin–Madison after his death.

Although he published comparatively little, Goldberg engaged in continual research from French archives for use in his courses. His lectures were highly condensed narratives based on meticulously detailed research. In a sense, Goldberg was a storyteller whose scholarship was poured into his genius for the spoken word on the lecture stage.

== Activist ==
Harvey Goldberg was an out gay activist, an anti-Vietnam War activist and what he would call an "hors du parti" socialist (outside of the Communist Party). Upon return to the University of Wisconsin he gained full tenure, and he used his massive student audience to more stridently speak out on pressing issues of the day. Many demonstrations would start immediately after his afternoon class, e.g. the occupation of the State Capitol grounds by farmer Ed Klessig and his cows in 1977 protesting a freeway through his pastures. As well, protests against the Vietnam war invariably started after his lectures, just as did later protests against U.S. intervention in Chile. In 1978, he helped form a local chapter of the Mass Party Organizing Committee, which grew out of Sunday morning brunches at the local activist, gay, legislative tavern, the Cardinal Bar. Also out of those meetings (and the Community Union effort) grew the Common Sense coalition which played a role in local Madison mayoral politics for several years.

While sympathetic to Trotsky's form of Marxism, his months of unsuccessful union organizing as a youth, and his outsider status as gay, Jewish and socialist kept him away from being a joiner of parties.

Goldberg also often took a year sabbatical to research, network, and engage politically in Paris, France, from his longtime walk-up apartment at 13, la Rue du Pont-aux-Choux in the Marais, near his beloved sans-coulotte district and the site of the Bastille dismantled in the French Revolutions. He humorously spoke of an extraordinary encounter at the apartment with nearly-blind Jean-Paul Sartre where Simone de Beauvoir served them boiled eggs (a feminine object) that rolled around on the plates in some kind of post-feminist semiotic revenge. Harvey's apartment and favorite restaurants were the scene of numerous rendezvous not only with historians, but activists and leaders including popular historian Howard Zinn, Chinese scholar and good friend Jean Chesneaux, litigator/civil rights activist Arthur Kinoy, esq., anti-poverty activist Frances Fox Piven and internationalist writer Susan George. His networking and support included U.S. war resisters such as Tom Nagel and Jim McKinney who published (under the cover of French exile policies) Zero: Paris American Exile Rock-Bottom Newsletter, leaders of Fight for the Larzac, the Irish Republican Socialist Party and even Breton separatists.

Goldberg spoke of his most important speech being at a rally in Paris during the Paris Peace talks led up by Henry Kissinger and the North Vietnamese, where he felt a strong American voice was needed. Another memorable speech for him was in Turkey in the '50s while on an international circuit with the United Nations.

== Publications ==
- American Radicals; some problems and personalities, Monthly Review Press, 1957
- French Colonialism; progress or poverty?, Rinehart, 1959
- The Life of Jean Jaures, University of Wisconsin Press, 1962

=== Lectures ===
A handful of Goldberg's students, including Iwanter, recorded his lectures before a packed house in Agricultural Hall. Some of these “bootleg” recordings are part of a CD collection released jointly by UW–Madison's Harvey Goldberg Center for the Study of Contemporary History and the community-based Harvey Goldberg Memorial Fund. A master list of all the Harvey Goldberg tapes at the University of Wisconsin Archives tapes is available from the Goldberg Center.
