= Ho-fung Hung =

American sociologist

- 孔誥烽
- Born: Hong Kong
- Citizenship: American
- Education: Chinese University of Hong Kong (B. Soc. Sc., M.Phil), State University of New York at Binghamton (MA), Johns Hopkins University (PhD)
- Occupations: Sociologist, political economist
- Employer: Johns Hopkins University
- Awards: Joseph Levenson Book Prize (2024)

Ho-fung Hung (Chinese: 孔誥烽, born November 13, 1972) is an American sociologist and political scientist currently serving as the Henry M. and Elizabeth P. Wiesenfeld Professor in Political Economy at Johns Hopkins University. Hung's work has addressed political economy in China, development, and Hong Kong politics.

== Education ==
Hung received a BA from the Chinese University of Hong Kong, an MA from SUNY-Binghamton, and a PhD in sociology from Johns Hopkins University.

== Publications ==
=== Books ===
- The China Question: Eight Centuries of Fantasy and Fear (Cambridge University Press, 2026)
- City on the Edge: Hong Kong Under Chinese Rule (Cambridge University Press, 2022)
- Clash of Empires: From ‘Chimerica’ to the ‘New Cold War’ (Cambridge University Press, 2022)
- The China Boom: Why China Will Not Rule the World (Columbia University Press, 2015)
- Protest with Chinese Characteristics: Demonstrations, Riots, and Petitions in the Mid-Qing Dynasty (Columbia University Press, 2011)
- China and the Transformation of Global Capitalism (Johns Hopkins University Press, 2009) Editor

== Awards ==
- 2024 Joseph Levenson Book Prize (China, post-1900) for City on the Edge: Hong Kong Under Chinese Rule
