= Robert Hymes =

American sinologist

- Awards: Joseph Levenson Prize (1989, 2002)

Academic background
- Education: Columbia University (BA); University of Pennsylvania (MA, PhD)

Academic work
- Discipline: Chinese history
- Institutions: Columbia University

Robert P. Hymes is an American historian and sinologist whose work has focused on the socio-cultural history of early modern China. Hymes is the Horace Walpole Carpentier Professor of Oriental Studies, East Asian Languages and Cultures at Columbia University.

== Biography ==
Hymes received his B.A. from Columbia College, his M.A. and Ph.D. from the University of Pennsylvania. His scholarship has focused on Chinese society during the Song and Yuan dynasties.

Hymes won the Joseph Levenson Book Prize twice from the Association for Asian Studies for his books Statesmen and Gentlemen: The Elite of Fu-chou, Chiang-hsi, in Northern and Southern Sung (Cambridge, 1986) and Way and Byway: Taoism, Local Religion, and Models of Divinity in Sung and Modern China (California, 2002).
