= Yuki Tanaka (historian) =

Japanese historian and political critic

Toshiyuki Tanaka (田中 利幸, Tanaka Toshiyuki; born May 26, 1949) is a Japanese historian and political critic.

Dr. Toshiyuki Tanaka was Emeritus Research Professor of History at the Hiroshima Peace Institute, Hiroshima City University before his retirement in 2015. He was a visiting professor at Birkbeck, University of London, and the Sir Ninian Stephen Visiting Scholar at the Law School, University of Melbourne.

He was a coordinator of the journal "The Asia-Pacific Journal: Japan Focus" and a member of the SVAC (Sexual Violence in Armed Conflicts) research project group funded by Hamburg Institute of Social Research.

Tanaka has written extensively about forced prostitution (comfort women) under the Empire of Japan, history of Japanese war crimes during World War II, American aerial bombing of Japanese cities as well as Japan under US military rule. South Korean academic Park Yu-ha has also written on differing interpretations related to the comfort women issue. Tanaka also writes about the laws of warfare and the atomic bombings of Hiroshima and Nagasaki. As a guest speaker, he has lectured about the criminality of strategic bombing and the atomic bombings at universities including the University of Chicago and the Chinese University of Hong Kong.

== Works ==
- Hidden Horrors: Japanese War Crimes in World War II, Westview Press (1996) ISBN 0-8133-2718-0
- Japan's Comfort Women: Sexual Slavery and Prostitution During World War II and the US Occupation, Routledge (2001) ISBN 0-415-19401-6
- (co-edited with Marilyn B. Young) Bombing Civilians: A Twentieth Century History, The New Press (2009) ISBN 1-59558-363-7
