= Asia-Pacific Journal =

Open-access peer-reviewed journal

- Discipline: Asian studies
- Language: English
- Edited by: Tristan R. Grunow, Mary M. McCarthy

Publication details
- History: 2002–present
- Publisher: Cambridge University Press
- Frequency: Monthly
- Open access: Yes

Standard abbreviations
- ISO 4: Asia-Pac. J.

Indexing
- ISSN: 1557-4660

Links
- Journal homepage

The Asia-Pacific Journal: Japan Focus is an open-access journal providing critical analysis of the forces shaping the Asia-Pacific and the world. Since 2002, APJJF—also known as Japan Focus—has published over 3,500 articles in English focusing on new research, commentary, interviews, and translations that explore the geopolitics, economics, history, society, culture, international relations, and environment of the modern and contemporary Asia-Pacific region. In 2008, the journal received the Ryukyu Shimpo's first Ikemiyagushiku Shui Memorial Prize, recognizing its outstanding worldwide contribution to proposing solutions to "problems confronting Okinawa."

Founded by Mark Selden, the journal is governed by a nonprofit board, and has an editorial board composed of specialists in a broad range of subjects related to the Asia-Pacific. The current coeditors are Tristan R. Grunow and Mary M. McCarthy. At the 2026 Association for Asian Studies (AAS) conference, APJJF organizes a "Critical Asian Scholarship in a Time of Global Crisis" roundtable.

The APJJF Course Readers (2012–2016) provide educational resources on 15 selected topics with explanatory introductions by scholars. APJJF also showcases winning submissions of the Kyoko Selden Memorial Translation Prize in Japanese Literature, Thought, and Society (2014–2022).

APJJF publishes under a Creative Commons license, and articles are abstracted and indexed in Scopus, Emerging Sources Citation Index (Web of Science), EBSCOhost Political Science Complete, and Directory of Open Access Journals (DOAJ).
