= Joseph W. Esherick =

American historian of modern China

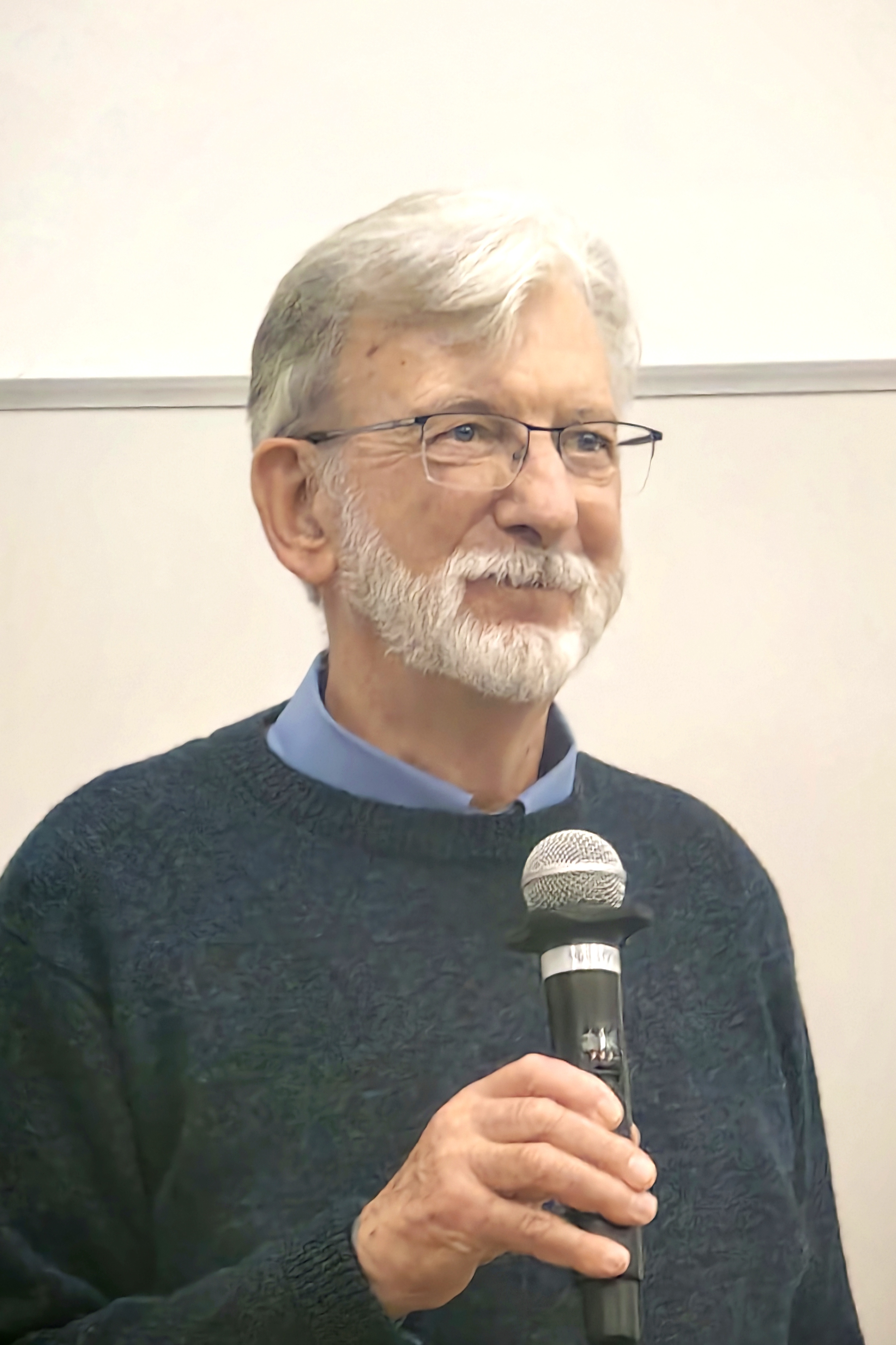
Joseph W. Esherick (2025)

Joseph W. Esherick (Chinese name: simplified Chinese: 周锡瑞; traditional Chinese: 周錫瑞; pinyin: Zhōu Xīruì, born 1942) is an American sinologist. He is a professor emeritus of modern Chinese history at the University of California, San Diego. He is the holder of the Hwei-chih and Julia Hsiu Chair in Chinese Studies. Esherick is a graduate of Harvard College (1964, summa cum laude). He received his Ph.D. from University of California, Berkeley (1971), under the supervision of Joseph R. Levenson and Frederic Wakeman.

== Works and views ==
In addition to publishing research monographs, Esherick published a series of essays on historiography and reviews of the large questions in modern Chinese history. As a member of the Committee of Concerned Asian Scholars, for instance, Esherick in 1972 published a critique of the field and of his undergraduate professor, John K. Fairbank, "Harvard on Imperialism." Later such essays dealt with the Revolution of 1911, Chiang Kai-shek, and the Revolution of 1949.

Critiquing the application of state-society models of China analysis, Esherick's work on rural Shaanxi in the late 1940s observes that representatives of the Party-state at the county level and below were themselves "members of society" and "deeply enmeshed in a variety of local networks from which they could never be completely separated."

== Publications ==
Books

- Modern China: The Story of a Revolution, co-authored with Orville Schell (Knopf and Vintage, 1972).
- Lost Chance in China: The World War II Despatches of John S. Service (Random House, 1974; Vintage paperback, 1975).
- Reform and Revolution in China: the 1911 Revolution in Hunan and Hubei (University of California Press, 1976; paperback: 1986; Chinese translation: Zhong-hua Publishing House, 1982; second edition: University of Michigan Press, 2002).
- The Origins of the Boxer Uprising (University of California Press, 1987; Chinese translation: Jiangsu People's Press, 1994).
  Winner of 1987 John K. Fairbank Prize from American Historical Association; 1989 Joseph Levenson Book Prize from the Association for Asian Studies; and the 1989 Berkeley Prize from the University of California Press.
- Chinese Local Elites and Patterns of Dominance (University of California Press, 1990), co-edited with Mary B. Rankin.
- Chinese Archives: An Introductory Guide, co-edited with Ye Wa (Berkeley: University of California Institute of East Asian Studies, 1996).
- Remaking the Chinese City: Modernity and National Identity, 1900–1950, edited volume. (University of Hawaii Press, 2000).
- Ancestral Leaves: A Family Journey through Chinese History (University of California Press, 2011).

Major Articles

- "Harvard on China: The Apologetics of Imperialism," Bulletin of Concerned Asian Scholars 4:4 (December 1972).
- "1911: A Review," the lead article of a symposium on 1911 in Modern China 2:2 (April 1976).
- "The 'Restoration of Capitalism' in Mao's and Marxist Theory," Modern China 5:1 (January 1979).
- "From Feudalism to Capitalism: Japanese Scholarship on the Transformation of Chinese Rural Society," co-authored with Linda Grove, Modern China 6:4 (October 1980).
- "Number Games: A Note on Land Distribution in Prerevolutionary China," Modern China 7:4 (October 1981)
- "Acting Out Democracy: Political Theater in Modern China," co-authored with Jeffrey Wasserstrom. Journal of Asian Studies, November 1990.
- "Founding a Republic, Electing a President: How Sun Yat-sen Became Guofu," in Harold Shiffrin and Eto Shinkichi, eds., China's Republican Revolution (Tokyo: University of Tokyo Press, 1994): pp. 129–152.
- "Deconstructing the Construction of the Party-State: Gulin County in the Shaan-Gan-Ning Border Region," China Quarterly, No. 140 (December 1994): 1052–1079.
- "Ten Theses on the Chinese Revolution," Modern China 21.1 (January 1995): 45–76
- "Cherishing Sources from Afar," Modern China 24.2 (April 1998)
- "Revolution in a Feudal Fortress: Yangjiagou Mizhi County, Shaanxi, 1937–1948," Modern China 24.4 (October 1998): 339–377
- "War and Revolution: Chinese Society During the 1940s," Twentieth-Century China 27.1 (November 2001): 1–37
