= Maurice Meisner =

Historian of modern China

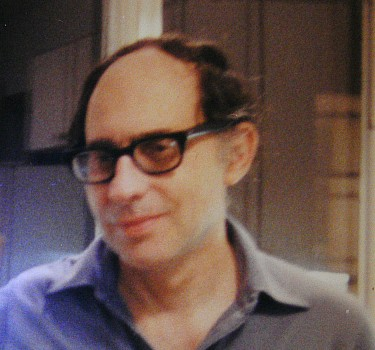
- Meisner in 1989
- Born: November 17, 1931; Detroit, Michigan, U.S.
- Died: January 23, 2012 (aged 80); Madison, Wisconsin, U.S.
- Education: Wayne State University (BA); University of Chicago (MA, PhD)
- Spouse(s): Lorraine S. Faxon (m. 1952; div. 1983) Lynn Lubkeman
- Children: 4
- Scientific career
- Fields: Sinology
- Workplaces: University of Wisconsin–Madison
- Thesis: Li Ta-chao and the Origins of Chinese Marxism (1962)
- Doctoral advisor: Leopold H. Haimson, Earl H. Pritchard

Maurice Jerome Meisner (November 17, 1931 – January 23, 2012) was an American sinologist and professor at the University of Wisconsin–Madison. He studied the Chinese Communist Revolution and the People's Republic and held a strong interest in socialist ideology, Marxism, and Maoism in particular. His publications included Li Ta-chao and the Origins of Chinese Marxism, a study of one of the founders of the Chinese Communist Party, and Mao's China: A History of the People's Republic which became a standard survey.

== Early years ==
Maurice Meisner was born in Detroit, Michigan in 1931 to Isadore Meisner and Leah Pergament, Jewish immigrants from Eastern Europe. He grew up during Great Depression and World War II, but reached adulthood during the post-war boom in which Detroit had become a center of culture and industry. He remained in Detroit for his undergraduate studies, enrolling at Wayne State University. An outstanding student, Meisner was admitted to a graduate program there after only two years of college.

He had two marriages each lasting about 30 years, first to Lorraine Faxon Meisner and subsequently to Lynn Lubkeman. He had three children from the first marriage and one child from the second.

The beginning of the Cold War and the Red Scare impacted the personal lives of Meisner and his first wife Lorraine. As part of the McCarthy investigations, Lorraine was subpoenaed before the House Un-American Activities Committee (HUAC) in 1952 in relation to her attendance at the 1951 World Festival of Youth and Students held in East Berlin. Like most witnesses called before hearings of HUAC or the Senate Internal Security Subcommittee (SISS), Lorraine Meisner refused to testify to the body. Although this assertion of her Fifth Amendment rights had no direct legal consequences, David Henry, president of Wayne State University where she was also a student, saw fit to expel her from the university. Although seen as an unusually harsh move even at the time, other schools were reluctant to admit a student dismissed under such circumstances.

The Meisners moved to Chicago to study at the University of Chicago, where they both would receive doctorates. Maurice Meisner undertook to study Chinese history in the wake of the 1949 revolution and role of China in the Korean War. This included studying the Chinese language. Meisner completed his master's thesis on The agrarian economy in China in the nineteenth century in 1955. Meisner's 1962 doctoral dissertation on Li Ta-chao and the origins of Chinese Marxism was prepared under the China historian Earl H. Pritchard and the Sovietologist Leopold Haimson. Developed during a further year of research at the East Asian Research Center at Harvard, it was published by Harvard University Press in 1967. Meisner studied in it the original contributions to Chinese revolutionary theory by the co-founder of the Chinese Communist Party, Li Dazhao, to show that the adaptation of Marxism to China which had been attributed to Mao Zedong had been pioneered by Li.

Maurice Meisner was an early member of the Committee of Concerned Asian Scholars (CCAS). In addition to opposing American participation in the Vietnam War, the group also involved itself in demystifying China at a time in which "Red China" was regularly portrayed as a threat to America. Meisner wrote for their publication, the Bulletin of Concerned Asian Scholars, and at the time of his death in 2012 he was still listed on the advisory board of the journal.

Beginning with an article in the 1963 The China Quarterly, he published articles in the leading journals in the field, including Asian Survey, Current History, Journal of Asian Studies, and Modern China, among others.

== Career ==
Meisner earned M.A. and Ph.D. degrees at the University of Chicago and was awarded fellowships at Harvard University and the Center for Advanced Study in the Behavioral Sciences (Stanford, California). In 1968 he left his first faculty position at the University of Virginia to accept a professorship at the University of Wisconsin–Madison where he would remain for the rest of his career. He took sabbaticals at the Woodrow Wilson Center (1980) and at the London School of Economics (1999).

=== Teaching at the University of Wisconsin ===
In 1968 the nation was in a state of apprehension and unrest given the continuing war in Vietnam and movements for the empowerment of minorities. This was the same year as the Tet Offensive which became widely viewed as a psychological turning point in the Vietnam war and American public opinion, the assassination of Martin Luther King and its aftermath, anti-war protests and police violence at the Democratic National Convention in Chicago. Protest activity on and off the university campuses was reaching a crescendo and Madison happened to be one of the most affected campuses, bolstered by its large student body which in large part came from outside of Wisconsin.Radical politics was in the air, bringing to the fore radical organizations and ideologies ranging from anarchism to various Marxist currents.

Interest in Meisner's Chinese history course was greatly bolstered by this perception of an international revolutionary pole headquartered in China along with Meisner's sympathy with the socialist goals underlying the revolution. Thus the one-time niche field of Chinese history gave way to a wider politically motivated audience requiring a large lecture hall.

1968 was during the Cultural Revolution in China, which received much fanfare among Western radicals but about which little was actually known. Many Maoists in the West found inspiration in the (perceived) role of the Red Guards, just as the English version of Mao's Red Book became widely toted as a revolutionary handbook. Competing Maoist groups in the U.S. (such as from the breakup of SDS) and the West attached themselves to the legacy of Mao Zedong and the cultural revolution, propelling interest in the recent history of China, the subject of Meisner's continuing research. As various absurdities and abuses committed during the Cultural Revolution became known, reactions of Maoist factions ranged from soul-searching to denial. Of obvious interest was Meisner's related research, although this was at a time when visiting the People's Republic was still impossible (as were visits by Chinese individuals to the West). Despite the difficulty in obtaining objective information, his study of the period made it into the classroom and would be incorporated into his 1977 work Mao's China: A History of the People's Republic.

=== Post-Mao China ===
By the late 1970s not only had the earlier wave of campus radicalism subsided, but definite changes were underway in China which were troubling, at best, to the remaining American Maoist currents and the so-called New Communist Movement which had emerged from the remnants of the New Left. Fascination with the cultural revolution had benefited from popular perceptions and slogans at a time when direct contact with Chinese communists was sparse, but in the years following Richard Nixon's China visit that began to change. With the death of Mao and the defeat of the Gang of Four, the political course of China was to rapidly change, whereas Western observers, both on the right and on the left, were often unable or unwilling to recognize the enormity of the transformation that had begun. This was just as Meisner's major work Mao's China was going to press, documenting the history and dynamics of the Chinese Communist Revolution up to that point.

A subsequent edition of that book published in 1985 included additional chapters addressing the aftermath of the power struggle, but which still saw the reform and opening up instituted by Deng Xiaoping as a tactical turn in the development of socialism. Following some years of China's accelerating economic and political evolution, however, Meisner's assessment of the entire period became more sober as he traced the rise of what he termed "bureaucratic capitalism," albeit under the official banner of building "socialism with Chinese characteristics." Indeed, he saw the economic transformations underway as having set the stage for the democracy movement of 1989. The curious evolution of socialist China towards capitalism, all the while maintaining Communist Party rule, was the subject of Meisner's 1996 work The Deng Xiaoping Era: An Inquiry into the Fate of Chinese Socialism, 1978-1994.

Meisner was himself in Beijing in 1989 up until a week before the crackdown on the democracy movement. His analysis of the protest movement contradicted both the official characterization of it as a "counterrevolutionary rebellion" and the Western media's inclination to depict any movement for greater democracy as welcoming of capitalism. Rather than simple concerns for greater democracy, the movement was propelled by a disgust of privilege attained by powerful bureaucrats which was seen as official corruption, and in fact a result of the market reforms. Meisner writes:

[Calls against] "Corruption" now conveyed a moral condemnation of the whole system of bureaucratic privilege and power.... But now that Communist leaders, high and low, were so deeply enmeshed in profiteering in the presumably "free" marketplace, they had gone well beyond the bounds of politico-ethical legitimacy in popular perceptions. The use of political power for private gain was viewed as unfair and unjust, and it inflamed slumbering resentments against bureaucratic privilege.

=== Harvey Goldberg ===
It was not only students and young people involved in the tumultuous social/political struggles permeating the campus during the 1960s and 70s. The issues rocking the campus naturally created divisions among academics, and most particularly those in history and the other the social sciences where the sorts of issues being played out on the streets were the very subject of academic instruction. In this context one can easily appreciate that Maurice Meisner would have connected to like-minded colleagues in the history department, resulting in a personal friendship with Professor Harvey Goldberg whose study of social movements in modern Europe mirrored Meisner's similar study of contemporary China. Goldberg was very well known and became extremely popular among radical students who would pack his lecture hall as he delivered his memorable orations which less often took the form of history lectures than as passionate political statements.

Their friendship endured well past the heyday of campus activism, with them spending considerable time together as Goldberg's health suffered toward the late 1980s. Struck by the death of his friend in 1987, Meisner was instrumental in establishing the Harvey Goldberg Center for the Study of Contemporary History to honor and remember the beloved professor. In the spirit of Harvey Goldberg, the center would go on to sponsor quite a number of speakers, conferences and symposia especially around issues of social concern, connecting the study of history and society with activism as well as maintaining an archive of Goldberg's work. Maurice Meisner assumed the title of Harvey Goldberg Professor of History for the remainder of his university career.

== Later years and death ==
Towards the end of his life, in 2009, a conference was held in honor of Meisner's distinguished career entitled "Reflections on History and Contemporary Change in China Before and After Tiananmen." The four-day conference, co-sponsored by the Harvey Goldberg Center, included a number of Meisner's former students, now themselves noted scholars of Chinese history. Following that conference three of Meisner's former students undertook to author and edit a book entitled Radicalism, Revolution, and Reform in Modern China: Essays in Honor of Maurice Meisner. The authors presented Meisner with an early copy of the book honoring him in 2011, the year before he died.

He died at his home in Madison, Wisconsin in 2012.

== Major works ==
- Li Ta-Chao and the Origins of Chinese Marxism. Harvard East Asian Series, 27. (Cambridge: Harvard University Press, 1967).
- with Rhoads Murphey, eds. The Mozartian Historian: Essays on the Works of Joseph R. Levenson. (Berkeley: University of California Press, 1976). ISBN 0520028260.
- Mao's China: A History of the People's Republic (New York: Free Press, 1977; revised 2nd ed. 1986). ISBN 0029208203.
  - Mao's China and After: A History of the People's Republic. (New York: Free Press, 3rd ed., 1999). ISBN 0684856352.
- Marxism, Maoism, and Utopianism: Eight Essays. (Madison: University of Wisconsin Press, 1982). ISBN 0299084205.
- The Deng Xiaoping Era: An Inquiry into the Fate of Chinese Socialism, 1978-1994. (New York: Hill and Wang, 1996). ISBN 0809078155.
- Mao Zedong: A Political and Intellectual Portrait. (Cambridge; Malden, MA: Polity, 2007). ISBN 9780745631066.
