= Robert J. Smith (anthropologist) =

American anthropologist

Robert John Smith (1927–2016) was an American anthropologist who taught at Cornell University, specializing in the anthropology of Japan. In 1974, he was named Goldwin Smith Professor of Anthropology. The Japanese government bestowed the Order of the Rising Sun on him in 1993. He was president of the Association for Asian Studies in 1988. He retired in 1997.

== Education and career ==
Smith left college in 1944 to join the United States Army, where he began the study of the Japanese language. After the war, he graduated from University of Minnesota in 1949, proceeding to Cornell for graduate work. He finished his PhD in 1955, and joined the Department of Anthropology, where he taught until retirement. He was chair of the department for nine years, from 1967, and chair of the Department of Asian Studies for five years.

== Selected works ==
- Robert J. Smith, The Japanese and Their Descendants in Brazil : An Annotated Bibliography (São Paulo, Brasil: Centro de Estudos Nipo-Brasileiros, 1967)
- Robert J. Smith, Ancestor Worship in Contemporary Japan (Stanford, Calif.: Stanford University Press, 1974)
- Robert J. Smith, Kurusu : The Price of Progress in a Japanese Village, 1951–1975 (Stanford, Calif.: Stanford University Press, 1978)
- Robert J. Smith, and Ella Lury Wiswell, The Women of Suye Mura (Chicago: University of Chicago Press, 1982)
- Smith, Robert J. (1989). "Presidential Address: Something Old, Something New—Tradition and Culture in the Study of Japan". The Journal of Asian Studies. 48 (4): 715–723. doi:10.2307/2058110. JSTOR 2058110. S2CID 162751204.
- Robert J. Smith, Japanese Society : Tradition, Self, and the Social Order (Cambridge, Eng.: Cambridge University Press, 1994)
