= Philip Denwood =

British Tibetologist

Philip Denwood is a British Tibetologist noted for his work on traditional Tibetan arts and handicrafts, Himalayan architecture and Tibetan linguistics.

He was born on 29 August 1941 in Workington, Cumberland where he also grew up. In 1962 he gained his BA in Geography and History at University College London (UCL), and later in 1964 an MA in Architecture and Town Planning from Liverpool University. He became a research Fellow in Tibetan at SOAS in 1965 and became Lecturer in Tibetan in 1973.

Denwood describes his interest in Himalayan cultures as purely accidental. Having completed his study at Liverpool and based in England, Denwood was living next door to a friend of his from college David Snellgrove. Snellgrove had not long returned from a trip to the Himalayas and had brought five Tibetan refugees back with him around the time of the first wave of exiles post 1959. Denwood's intrigue about the situation with his friend's house guests, coupled with his interest in oriental architecture inspired him to join Snellgrove on an overland trip to India he had been planning. They drove a Land Rover to Nepal together (which they later sold to a Bhutanese army officer), and Denwood stayed there learning Tibetan while Snellgrove went ahead to South India. When Snellgrove returned to Nepal, Denwood joined him once again and they drove to Bhutan. The trip lasted a year in total and learning the Tibetan language had prompted Denwood's interest in linguistics.

When he returned to England, Denwood landed the training post of Research Fellow of Tibetan at the School of Oriental and African Studies, University of London (SOAS), where he was eventually appointed as a lecturer.

During his time learning Tibetan in Nepal, Denwood had observed the lack of material available for learning the language, and found the native approach to teaching too unscientific. His budding interest in linguistics brought about his own analysis of the language, learning also from Richard Keith Sprigg who at the time was teaching in the SOAS Linguistics department. This study culminated in the writing of his own book of Tibetan grammar, titled; 'Tibetan'.

Denwood's interest in Tibetan handicrafts he again describes as accidental. The SOAS library had sent him to Delhi, India on a placement for 6 months. He traveled with his wife and two young children. Having been introduced to the Tibetan community there he became familiar with the carpet trade. It was his wife who decided to learn how to weave a carpet, whilst Denwood wrote a book about the process.

Denwood retired from teaching at SOAS in 2006.

== Works ==
- Denwood, Philip (1971). "Bhutanese architecture." Journal of the Royal Central Asian Society 58.1: 24–33.
- Denwood, Philip (1973). "A Greek Bowl from Tibet." Iran XI: 121–128.
- Denwood, Philip (1974). The Tibetan Carpet. Aris & Phillips, Warminster.
- Denwood, Philip (1977). Le Tapis Tibétain. Le Courrier du Livre, Paris 1977.
- Denwood, Philip (1978). Arts of the Eurasian Steppelands (edited), (Percival David Foundation Colloquy 7), SOAS.
- Denwood, Philip (1978) "Stupas of the Tibetan Bonpos." in The Stupa, ed. by A.Dallapiccola, Heidelberg 1978.
- Denwood, Philip (1980). "Temple and Rock Inscriptions at Alchi." in D.L.Snellgrove & T.Skorupski, The Cultural Heritage of Ladakh vol 2, Aris & Phillips, Warminster. 117–163.
- Denwood, Philip (1981). "Metal and other objects in some of the Istanbul Album paintings." (with G.Fehervari) in Islamic Art 1, The Islamic Art Foundation, New York.

Buddhist Studies, Ancient and Modern (edited with A.Piatigorsky), SOAS, Centre of South Asian Studies 1983.

"Notes on some Tibetan Bonpo Rituals." in Buddhist Studies, Ancient and Modern (see above), 12–19.

- Denwood, Philip (). "The Tibetan noun-final -s." Linguistics of the Tibeto-Burman Area 9/1, 97–101.
- Denwood, Philip (1990). "Inscriptions at Balukhar and Char Zampa and archaeological observations on the fort of Balukhar and its environs" (with N.F.Howard), T. Skorupski, (ed.),

Indo-Tibetan Studies. Papers in honour and appreciation of Professor David L.Snellgrove's contribution to Indo-Tibetan studies (= Buddhica Britannica vol.2). Tring (1990), The Institute of Buddhist Studies, 75–80. [10]

- Denwood, Philip (1991). "Some rare words in Tibetan documents of the early period", E.Steinkellner (ed.), Tibetan history and language. Studies dedicated to Uray Geza on his seventieth birthday (= Wiener Studien zur Tibetologie und Buddhismuskunde 26). Vienna (1991), Arbeitskreis für tibetische und buddhistische Studien Universität Wien, 129–136. [10]
- Denwood, Philip (1990). "Uses of Indian technical literature in Tibetan architecture", South Asian Studies 6 (1990), 95–104. [2, 10]
- Denwood, Philip (1990). "Some remarks on the status and dating of the sBa-bzhed ", The Tibet Journal XV,6 (1990), 135–148. [2]

"Some formative influences on Mahayana Buddhist art," The Buddhist Forum 2, London (1991), SOAS.

"Sources of mandala design in India and Tibet", R.Whitfield (ed.), The Rise of Esoteric Buddhist Art, Percival David Foundation Colloquy No. 13, London (1992), SOAS .

"Tibetan", Encyclopaedia of Language and Linguistics, Pergamon Press & University of Aberdeen Press, Oxford & Aberdeen (1993)

Recent Research on Ladakh 4 & 5: proceedings of the Fourth and Fifth International Colloquia on Ladakh. (edited with H.Osmaston) SOAS/Motilal Banarsidas 1996.

“William Moorcroft: an Assessment.” in Proceedings of the Fifth International Conference on Ladakh in Recent Research on Ladakh 4 & 5, 39–54.

“The Tibetanisation of Ladakh: the Linguistic Evidence.” in Proceedings of the Fifth International Conference on Ladakh in Recent Research on Ladakh 4 & 5, 281–289.

“The artist’s treatise of sMan-bla Don-grub”, The Tibet Journal XXI/2, Summer 1996, 24–30.

“Tibetan sl- and zl-”, The Tibet Journal XXI/3, Autumn 1996.

Tibetan Art: Towards a definition of Style (edited, with J.Casey Singer) Calmann & Kng, London 1997.

“Architectural style at Shalu.” in Tibetan Art: Towards a definition of Style edited by J.Casey Singer & Philip Denwood, Calmann & Kng, London 1997, 220–229.

Tibetan, Benjamins, Amsterdam 1999.

“Early connections between Ladakh/Baltistan and Amdo/Kham.” in Ladakhi Histories: Local and Regional perspectives, edited by John Bray, Brill, Leiden & Boston, 2006, 31–40.

“The Tibetans in the Western Himalayas and Karakoram, Seventh-Eleventh Centuries: Rock art and inscriptions.” Journal of Inner Asian Art & Archaeology 2, 2007, 49–58.

“The Tibetans in the West.” Part 1: Journal of Inner Asian Art & Archaeology 3, 2008, 7-21.
