= Lucien Bianco =

French historian and sinologist

- Born: Lucien André Bianco; April 19, 1930 (age 96)
- Education: École Normale Supérieure, École nationale des Langues orientales, University of Paris
- Scientific career
- Fields: Chinese history

Chinese name
- Traditional Chinese: 畢仰高
- Simplified Chinese: 毕仰高
Transcriptions
Standard Mandarin
- Hanyu Pinyin: Bì Yǎnggāo

Lucien André Bianco (born 19 April 1930 in Ugine) is a French historian and sinologist specializing in the history of the Chinese peasantry in the twentieth century. He is the author of a reference book on the origins of the Chinese Communist Revolution and has co-edited the book China in the twentieth century. His Peasants without the Party was awarded the Association for Asian Studies Joseph Levenson Book Prize in 2003.

O. E. Westad of Yale University described Blanco as influential outside of his home country and "the doyen of French historians of China."

Jean-Philippe Béja, in The China Quarterly, described Bianco as a "great historian of the Chinese revolution".

== Life ==
After attending high school Bianco enrolled in the École Normale Supérieure and the École nationale des Langues orientales, where he learned Chinese. In 1968 he obtained his degree in history from the University of Paris, where he wrote his thesis on the history of Thailand. He later spent time teaching at Harvard University Princeton University, University of Michigan, Stanford, and in Taiwan and Hongkong. For many years he was director of studies at the Ecole des Hautes Etudes en Sciences Sociales in Paris and taught at the Institut d'Études Politiques de Paris.

The release of Bianco's 1967 book "Les origines de la révolution chinoise 1915-1949" proved to be highly influential in Chinese research in France and was translated into numerous languages, including English, German, and Japanese.

In the 1960s and 1970s Bianco was an outspoken critic of the government of China, and in particular Mao Zedong and Cultural Revolution. Peter Bernard Harris praised Bianco's stance, stating that "Professor Lucien Bianco has boldly asserted his opposition not merely to the Gang of Four but, more particularly, to what he called 'Maologie.'" Bianco was also a critic of the 1973 Paris Peace Accord that ended the Vietnam War and joined a group of Asian specialists who protested the agreement because of the treatment of political prisoners by the South Vietnamese government.

In 2003, Bianco's book Peasants Without the Party: Grassroots Movements in 20th-Century China won the Joseph Levenson Book Prize. In awarding the prize, the Association for Asian Studies praised Bianco's work as "a quarter-century of innovative and careful research about peasant discontent." The committee judged that

arguing that class consciousness and revolutionary activity did not come "naturally" but that they could certainly be nurtured, Bianco provides a thoroughly documented corrective to earlier narratives of peasant revolution. In doing so, he helps students of the Chinese revolution understand not only the role of the peasant, but also the discourse of peasant revolution that is woven throughout social life. Furthermore, through his constant revision of his earlier ideas and his evenhanded consideration of work by other scholars, Bianco exhibits a fine sensitivity to changes in the researcher’s intellectual approach over time, as well as to the biases inherent in historical sources.

== Works ==
- Les origines de la révolution chinoise 1915-1949. Paris : Gallimard, 1967.
  - Published in English as Origins of the Chinese Revolution, 1915-1949
- Peasants Without the Party: Grass-Roots Movements in Twentieth-Century China (Asia and the Pacific, Armonk, N.Y.) 2001
- Origins of the Chinese Revolution, 1915-1949. Translated from French by Muriel Bell. 1971. Stanford University Press. ISBN 0-8047-0827-4.
- La Chine au XXe siècle. Paris : Fayard, 1990.
- La Chine. Un exposé pour comprendre, un essai pour réfléchir, Paris : Flammarion, 1994.
- Peasants Without the Party : Grass-Roots Movements in Twentieth-Century China, M.E. Sharpe, 2003.
- Jacqueries et Révolution dans la Chine du XXe siècle, Paris : La Martinière, 2005.
- La récidive: Révolution russe, révolution chinoise. Paris: Gallimard 2014.
  - Published in English as Stalin and Mao. A comparison of the Russian and Chinese Revolutions. Chinese University of Hong Kong, 2018.
