= David Schaberg =

American academic (born 1964)

- Education: Stanford University; Harvard University
- Occupation: Academic
- Employer: University of California, Los Angeles

David Schaberg is an American academic. He is the author of a book on the Zuo Zhuan and the Guoyu, for which he won the 2003 Joseph Levenson Book Prize. He was formerly the dean of humanities and the senior dean of the college at the University of California, Los Angeles (UCLA).

== Early life ==
David Schaberg graduated from Stanford University in 1986. He earned a PhD in Comparative Literature from Harvard University in 1996.

== Career ==
Schaberg joined the Department of Asian Languages and Cultures at UCLA in 1996. Since July 2012, he has served as the dean of Humanities at UCLA. He was appointed as the senior dean of the college for a two-year term beginning July 1, 2020.

Schaberg is the author of a book entitled A Patterned Past: Form and Thought in Early Chinese Historiography, for which he won the 2003 Joseph Levenson Book Prize. The book is about two Chinese texts: the Zuo zhuan and the Guoyu. In a review for The Review of Politics, Karen Turner described it as "very well-grounded in literary theory and comparative studies" but "clearly aimed to appeal to a scholarly audience of China specialists familiar with the debates surrounding these two ancient texts." Reviewing it for The Journal of Asian Studies, professor Stephen Durrant praised the book as "worth reading, pondering, and consulting over and over again", adding that it "deserves a prominent place on the bookshelf of every student of early China." University of Wisconsin-Madison William Nienhauser wrote in the Journal of the American Oriental Society that "this is a book that should be read once by all students of early China" and re-read. In the Harvard Journal of Asiatic Studies, professor Martin Kern of Princeton University wrote a lengthy review, and concluded, "David Schaberg's work will prove invaluable for all further study of Chinese historiography, anecdotal narrative, and rhetoric. It gives great pleasure through its intelligent argument, fine phrasing, and comprehensive scholarship."

== Selected works ==
- Schaberg, David (2001). A Patterned Past: Form and Thought in Early Chinese Historiography. Cambridge, Massachusetts: Harvard University Asia Center. ISBN 9780674008618. OCLC 469530203.
