= Carl Riskin =

American economist

Carl Riskin is an American economist, Distinguished Professor Emeritus at Queens College, City University of New York and the CUNY graduate school. He also taught at Columbia University, where he was a senior research scholar and remains a research associate.

== Publications ==
- Income and Inequality in China, A. R. Khan, K. Griffin, C. Riskin and Zhao Renwei, “Household income and its distribution in China,” The China Quarterly, No. 132 (12, 1992), pp. 1029–1061
- Chinese Rural Poverty: Marginalized or Dispersed? Carl Riskin - The American Economic Review - Vol. 84, No. 2, Papers and Proceedings of the Hundred and Sixth Annual Meeting of the American Economic Association (May, 1994), pp. 281–284
- Carl Riskin on Google Scholar
- Carl Riskin (June 11, 1987). China's political economy: the quest for development since 1949. Oxford University Press. ISBN 978-0-19-877089-3.
- Carl Riskin; Azizur Rahman Khan (2001). Inequality and Poverty in China in the Age of Globalization. Oxford University Press. ISBN 978-0-19-513649-4.
- Carl Riskin; Zhao Renwei; Li Shih (July 8, 2016). China's Retreat from Equality: Income Distribution and Economic Transition. Routledge. ISBN 978-1-315-49960-4.
