= Richard Madsen =

American sociologist

- Citizenship: American
- Education: Harvard University (MA, PhD)
- Occupation: Sociologist
- Employer: University of California, San Diego

Richard Madsen is an American sociologist. He is currently distinguished professor of sociology at the University of California, San Diego, specializing in sociology of China.

== Biography ==
Madsen received his A.B. at the Department of Philosophy at Maryknoll College and his B.D. (1967) and M.Th. (1968) at Maryknoll Seminary. He then moved to Taiwan to study at the Chinese Language Institute in Fu Jen Catholic University (1968-1970) and at the Department of Sociology at National Taiwan University (1970-1971). Upon his return to the United States, he completed his M.A. in Religious Studies (1972) and Ph.D. in Sociology (1977), both on East Asia from Harvard.

He joined the University of California, San Diego since 1983 and was promoted to Professor in 1985. He was Chair of the Program in Chinese Studies between 1984 and 1987. He was a co-director of a Ford Foundation project to help revive the academic discipline of sociology in China and was Director of UC Fudan Center at the School of Global Policy and Strategy.

He is the recipient of several book awards, including a Jury Nominee for the Pulitzer Prize for General Nonfiction and the L.A. Times Book Award for Habits of the Heart: Individualism and Commitment in American Life (1985), as well as the C. Wright Mills Award for Morality and Power in a Chinese Village (1984).

== Analysis ==
Madsen's text China's Catholics (1998) addresses the disparity in growth rates of Protestantism in China and Catholicism in China. Madsen contends that because Catholicism is focused on tight-knit religious communities, it has been less able to adapt to the impact of market-oriented reforms on Chinese society than Protestantism has. Madsen's analysis emphasizes the structural aspects of modernization in China and urbanization in China.

Madsen's sociological work has documented that many of the geographic centers of Catholic religious practice in China through the mid and late 20th century are the rural communities where Catholic identity functioned as the equivalent of ethnic heritage or clan.

== Selected works ==
- Yang-Hsu, Becky and Richard Madsen (2019). The Chinese Pursuit of Happiness Anxieties, Hopes, and Moral Tensions in Everyday Life. Berkeley: University of California Press. ISBN 9780520306325
- Madsen, Richard (2007). Democracy's Dharma: Religious Renaissance and Political Development in Taiwan. Berkeley: University of California Press. ISBN 9780520252271
- Madsen, Richard (1998). China's Catholics Tragedy and Hope in an Emerging Civil Society. Berkeley: University of California Press. ISBN 9780520920736
- Madsen, Richard (1995). China and the American Dream: A Moral Inquiry. Berkeley: University of California Press. ISBN 9780520914926
- Bellah, Robert Neelly, Richard Madsen, William M. Sullivan, Ann Swidler, and Steven M. Tipton (1985). Habits of the Heart: Individualism and Commitment in American Life. Berkeley: University of California Press. ISBN 9780520053885
- Madsen, Richard (1984). Morality and Power in a Chinese Village. Berkeley: University of California Press. ISBN 9780520059252
- Chan, Anita, Richard Madsen, and Jonathan Unger Berkeley: University of California Press. (1984). Chen Village Revolution to Globalization. ISBN 9780520259317
