= Critical Asian Studies =

- Discipline: Asian studies
- Language: English
- Edited by: Robert J. Shepherd

Publication details
- Former name: Bulletin of Concerned Asian Scholars
- History: Since 1968
- Publisher: Routledge
- Frequency: Quarterly
- Impact factor: 1.4 (2024)

Standard abbreviations
- ISO 4: Crit. Asian Stud.

Indexing
- ISSN: 1467-2715 (print); 1472-6033 (web)
- LCCN: 2002238957
- OCLC no.: 45440468

Links
- Journal homepage; Online access; Online archive

Critical Asian Studies is a quarterly peer-reviewed academic journal covering research in Asian studies. It is published by Routlegde and the editor-in-chief is Robert J. Shepherd (George Washington University).

== History ==
The journal was conceived in 1967 by the Committee of Concerned Asian Scholars, a group that coalesced around young scholarly opposition to United States involvement in the Vietnam War. From 1968 until 2001 it was published under the name of Bulletin of Concerned Asian Scholars. In the estimation of Fabio Lanza, the journal was at its inception "radical, vibrant, at times excessive, and always politically minded.

== Abstracting and indexing ==
The journal is abstracted and indexed in:

- GEOBASE
- Scopus
- MLA - Modern Language Association Database
- EBSCO databases

According to the Journal Citation Reports, the journal has a 2024 impact factor of1.4.
