= List of sinologists =

A list of sinologists around the world, past and present. Sinology is commonly defined as the academic study of China primarily through Chinese language, literature, and history, and often refers to Western scholarship. Its origin "may be traced to the examination which Chinese scholars made of their own civilization."

The field of sinology was historically seen to be equivalent to the application of philology to China, and until the 20th century was generally seen as meaning "Chinese philology" (language and literature). Sinology has broadened in modern times to include Chinese history, epigraphy, and other subjects.

== Australia ==
- Rafe de Crespigny
- Charles Patrick Fitzgerald
- Colin Mackerras
- Robert Henry Mathews
- John Minford
- Pierre Ryckmans
- Yingjie Guo
- Kevin Rudd

== Austria ==
- Michael Prochazka

== Belgium ==
- Simon Leys
- Roel Sterckx (born 1969)
- Antoine Thomas
- Ferdinand Verbiest
- Dan Vercammen

== Bulgaria ==
- Snejina Gogova

== Canada ==
- Timothy Brook
- Charles Burton
- Jerome Ch'en (born 1919)
- Sarah Eaton
- Edwin G. Pulleyblank
- Michael Szonyi
- Chia-ying Yeh

== China ==
- James Dyer Ball (1847–1919)
- Yuen Ren Chao
- C. T. Hsia
- Huang Xianfan
- D. C. Lau
- Li Xueqin
- Rao Zongyi
- Qian Mu
- Qiu Xigui
- Wang Li, linguist
- Wang Tao, archaeologist
- Wang Zhongshu
- Xia Nai
- Yang Bojun

== Czech Republic ==
- Gustav Haloun (1898–1951)
- Jaroslav Průšek (1906–1980)

== Estonia ==
- Linnart Mäll

== France ==
- Jean-Baptiste Du Halde (1674–1743)
- Arcade Huang (1679–1717)
- Étienne Fourmont (1683–1745)
- Jean Denis Attiret (1702–1768)
- Jean Joseph Marie Amiot (1718–1793)
- Jean-Pierre Abel-Rémusat (1788–1832) – studied languages of the Far East and produced the Essai sur la langue et la littérature chinoises, and the Chinese novel Iu-kiao-li, ou les deux cousines, roman chinois.
- Stanislas Julien (1797–1873)
- Séraphin Couvreur (1835–1919)
- Léopold de Saussure (1886–1925)
- Léon Wieger (1956–1933)
- Édouard Chavannes (1865–1918) – best known for his 1) translations from Sima Qian's Shiji, sections of the Hou Hanshu, and the Weilüe 2) studies of Han dynasty stone carvings and Chinese religion, including the groundbreaking study of the worship of Mount Tai in ancient China. His students included Henri Maspero, Paul Pelliot and Marcel Granet.
- Paul Pelliot (1878–1945)
- Victor Segalen (1878–1919) – scholar of ancient Chinese sculpture
- Henri Maspero (1883–1945)
- Paul Demiéville – studied the Franco-Belgian school of Buddhology. His 1947 work 'Mirror of the Mind' was widely read in the U.S. and inaugurated a series by him on subitism and gradualism.
- Marcel Granet (1884–1940) – one of the first to use sociological methods
- Jean Escarra (1885–1955)
- René Grousset (1885–1952)
- Étienne Balazs (1905–1963)
- Nicole Vandier-Nicolas (1906–1987)
- Jacques Gernet (1921–2018)
- Jean-Pierre Drège (born 1946)
- François Jullien (born 1951)
- Anne Cheng (born 1955)
- David Gosset (born 1970)
- Corinne Debaine-Francfort (birth date unknown)
- Michel Soymié (1924–2002)
- Joël Bellassen (born 1950)
- Jean-Pierre Diény (1927–2014)

== Germany ==
- Carl Arendt (1838-1902), linguist University of Berlin
- Wolfram Eberhard (1909-1989), ethnologist at University of Berlin
- Hans Georg Conon von der Gabelentz (1807–1874) – linguist at University Leipzig and University of Berlin; author of comprehensive Chinesische Grammatik.
- Herbert Franke (1914–2011), historian at LMU Munich
- Otto Franke (1863–1946), historian University of Berlin
- Wolfgang Franke (1912–2007), son of Otto, historian at University of Hamburg
- Henning Klöter (born 1969), linguist at Humboldt University of Berlin
- Emil Krebs (1867–1930) – polyglot and linguist at University of Berlin
- Yu-chien Kuan (1931–2018), translator, writer and historian at University of Hamburg
- Manuel Vermeer (1962 - ), translator, writer at Heidelberg University
- Wolfgang Kubin (born 1945), literary scholar at Free University of Berlin, University of Bonn and Shantou University
- Walter Liebenthal (1886–1982), philosopher at University of Tübingen
- Klaus Mühlhahn (born 1963), historian at Free University of Berlin
- Christian Schwarz-Schilling (born 1930), politician, diplomat and historian; High Representative for Bosnia and Herzegovina 2007-2007
- Ulrich Theobald, economic historian at the University of Tübingen and maintainer of ChinaKnowledge.de
- Erling von Mende (born 1940), historian at Free University of Berlin
- Rudolf G. Wagner (1941-2019), historian at Heidelberg University
- Susanne Weigelin-Schwiedrzik (born 1955), political scientist at University of Vienna
- Richard Wilhelm (1873–1930) – his translations of the I Ching and other philosophical works popularized classical Chinese thought throughout the Western World, missionary and theologian at University of Washington.
- Diana Lange (born 1973), tibetologist at Humboldt University of Berlin

== Greece ==
- Dimitri Kitsikis (born 1935) Professor of International Relations and Geopolitics at the University of Ottawa
- Konstantinos G. Polymeros, also known as 莫磊 in China (born 1995) -his translation of the Dao De Jing (道德经) was the first in Greece to be rendered directly from the ancient Chinese text. He has also published various newspaper articles in both Greek and Chinese, along with translations and commentaries on Tang poetry. Polymeros currently teaches Chinese at the University of Western Macedonia.

== Hungary ==
- Ákos Bertalan Apatóczky (born 1974)
- Étienne Balazs (1905–1963)
- Imre Galambos (born 1967)
- Imre Hamar (born 1968)
- László Ladány (1914–1990)
- Lajos Magyar (1891–1940)
- Gábor Kósa (born 1971)
- Zsolt Tokaji (born 1971)

== India ==
- Tan Yun-Shan (1898–1983)
- Tan Chung
- Yukteshwar Kumar
- B R Deepak
- Prabodh Chandra Bagchi
- Srikanth Kondapalli

== Ireland ==
- Sean Hurley

== Italy ==
- Martino Martini (1614–1661)
- Matteo Ricci (1552–1610)
- Michele Ruggieri (1543–1607)
- Giuseppe Tucci (1894–1984)

== Japan ==
- Masaru Aoki 靑木正兒 (1887–1964)
- Tetsuji Morohashi 諸橋轍次 (1883–1982)
- A. Charles Muller
- D. T. Suzuki 鈴木大拙 (1870–1966)
- Takakusu Junjirō 高楠順次郎 (1866–1945)
- Kōjirō Yoshikawa 吉川幸次郎; 18 March 1904 – 8 April 1980)
- Yoshimi Takeuchi 竹內好 (1910–1977)
- Naitō Torajirō 內藤虎次郎 (1866–1934)
- Fukui Fumimasa 福井文雅 (1934–2017)

== Kazakhstan ==
- Yury Zuev (1932–2006)

== Moldova ==
- Nicolae Milescu – Moldavian writer, traveler, geographer, and diplomat who was named ambassador of the Russian Empire to Beijing in 1675. He submitted to the Foreign Ministry three volumes of notes of his travels through Siberia and China and later Travels through Siberia to the Chinese borders.

== Netherlands ==
- Frank Dikötter (1941 - ) author and historian of modern Chinese history
- J.J.L. Duyvendak (1889–1954)
- Jan Jakob Maria de Groot (1854–1921), scholar of Chinese folk religion
- Robert van Gulik (1910–1967)
- Hans van de Ven
- Erik Zürcher (1928–2008)

== New Zealand ==
- Rewi Alley

== Norway ==
- Henry Henne (1918–2002)

== Poland ==
- Michał Boym

== Portugal ==
- Gaspar da Cruz (c.1520–1570), author of the first book on China in Western Europe
- Bento de Góis (c.1562–1607), historian from China

== Philippines ==
- Alfredo Co

== Qatar ==
- Ali bin Ghanem Al-hajiri

== Russia ==
- Nikita Yakovlevich Bichurin (1775–1853)
- Pyotr Ivanovich Kafarov (1817–1878)
- Evgenij Ivanovich Kychanov (1932–2013)
- Peter A. Boodberg (1903–1972)
- Julian Shchutsky (1897–1938)
- Vasiliy Mikhaylovich Alekseyev (1881–1951)
- Nikolai Iosifovich Konrad (1891–1970)
- Nikolai Fedorenko (1912–2000)
- Vyacheslav Rybakov (born 1954)
- Victor Velgus (1922–1980)

== Singapore ==
- Wang Gungwu

== Slovenia ==
- Jana S. Rošker
- Mitja Saje

== Spain ==
- Miguel de Benavides (c. 1552–1605), then based in Spanish Colonial Philippines. (3rd Archbishop of Manila and founder of University of Santo Tomas)
- Juan Cobo (Chinese: 高母羨; pinyin: Gāo Mǔxiàn) (c. 1546–1592), then based in Spanish Colonial Philippines.
- Carmelo Elorduy (1901–1989)
- Juan González de Mendoza (c. 1540–1617), compiler of one of the first European books about China

== Sweden ==
- Göran Malmqvist (simplified Chinese: 马悅然; traditional Chinese: 馬悅然; pinyin: Mǎ Yuèrán)
- Johan Gunnar Andersson
- Bernhard Karlgren (simplified Chinese: 高本汉; traditional Chinese: 高本漢; pinyin: Gāo Běnhàn) (1889–1978)

== Switzerland ==
- Jean François Billeter
- Léopold de Saussure (1866–1925)

== Thailand ==
- Theraphan Luangthongkum

== Turkey ==
- 'Ali Akbar Khata'i, the author of an early book of China (completed in Istanbul in 1516)

== United Kingdom ==
- Edmund Backhouse (1873–1944)
- Frederick W. Baller
- Robert Bickers
- Derek Bryan (1910–2003)
- Craig Clunas
- Evangeline Edwards (1888–1957)
- Mark Elvin
- Bernhard Fuehrer
- Herbert Giles (1845–1935)
- Lionel Giles (1875–1958)
- A.C. Graham (1919–1991)
- Henrietta Harrison (born 1967)
- David Hawkes (1923–2009)
- Michel Hockx
- Reginald Johnston (1874–1938)
- Gregory B. Lee
- James Legge (1815–1897)
- Michael Loewe
- Roderick MacFarquhar
- David L. McMullen
- Oliver J. Moore
- Joseph Needham (1900–1995)
- Jessica Rawson (born 1943)
- William Edward Soothill (1861–1935)
- Michael Sullivan (born 1916)
- James Summers (1828–1891)
- Tian Yuan Tan
- Paul Thompson (1931–2007)
- Denis C. Twitchett (1925–2006)
- Thomas Francis Wade (1818–1895)
- Andrew West (1960-2025)
- Arthur Waley (1889–1966)
- Helen Wang
- Susan Whitfield
- Endymion Wilkinson (born 1941)
- Frances Wood
- Edward Harper Parker (1849–1926)

== United States ==
- William Alford
- Sarah Allan
- Robert Ashmore
- Wm. Theodore de Bary
- Timothy Brook
- Derk Bodde (1909–2003)
- James Cahill, art historian
- Wing-tsit Chan (1901–1994)
- Kang-i Sun Chang
- Kwang-chih Chang
- Jonathan Chaves
- Anthony E. Clark
- Jerome Cohen
- Herlee G. Creel (1905–1994)
- Pamela Kyle Crossley
- John DeFrancis (1911–2009)
- Edward L. Dreyer (1940–2007)
- Prasenjit Duara
- Homer H. Dubs
- Mark Elliott
- Mark Elvin
- Joseph Esherick
- John K. Fairbank (1907–1991)
- Courtenay Hughes Fenn
- Henry Courtenay Fenn
- Joshua Fogel
- Gail Hershatter
- David Hinton
- Dale Hoiberg
- Cho-yun Hsu
- Immanuel C.Y. Hsu (1923–2005)
- Ray Huang (Huang Renyu) (1918–2000)
- Philip C. C. Huang
- William Hung (Hong Ye)
- Charles Hucker
- Obed Simon Johnson (1881–1970)
- David Keightley
- George A. Kennedy
- David R. Knechtges
- Owen Lattimore
- Mark Edward Lewis
- Li Feng
- Paul Linebarger
- E. Perry Link
- Victor Mair
- Susan L. Mann
- Emily Martin
- Thomas Metzger
- Frederick W. Mote
- Jerry Norman (1936–2012)
- David Nivison
- Stephen Owen
- Peter C. Perdue
- Elizabeth J. Perry
- Andrew H. Plaks
- Carlos Rojas
- Edward H. Schafer
- Stuart R. Schram
- Sidney Shapiro
- Edward L. Shaughnessy
- Nathan Sivin
- Jonathan Spence
- Richard B. Stamps
- Hugh Stimson (1931–2011)
- Laurence Thompson
- Tsien Tsuen-hsuin (T.H. Tsien)
- Tu Wei-ming
- Frederic Wakeman (1937–2006)
- Joanna Waley-Cohen
- Burton Watson
- Stephen H. West
- C. Martin Wilbur
- Karl August Wittfogel (1896–1988)
- R. Bin Wong
- Timothy C. Wong
- Arthur F. Wright (1913–1976)
- Mary C. Wright (1917–1970)
- Yang Lien-sheng (1914–1990)
- Yu Ying-shih (1930–2021)
- Ernest P. Young
- Maria Adele Carrai

== Venezuela ==
- Alfredo Toro Hardy (born 1950)
