= Gogov =

Gogov (Bulgarian, Macedonian, Russian or Serbian Cyrillic: Гогов) is a Bulgarian masculine surname, its feminine counterpart is Gogova. It may refer to

- Đorđe Gogov (born 1988), Serbian singer, musician, and television personality
- Mihail Gogov (1912–1999), Archbishop of Ohrid and Macedonia
- Snejina Gogova (born 1937), Bulgarian Sinologist, sociolinguist and psycholinguist
- Tanya Gogova (born 1950), Bulgarian volleyball player
