= Southern Min Wikipedia =

Min Nan–language edition of Wikipedia

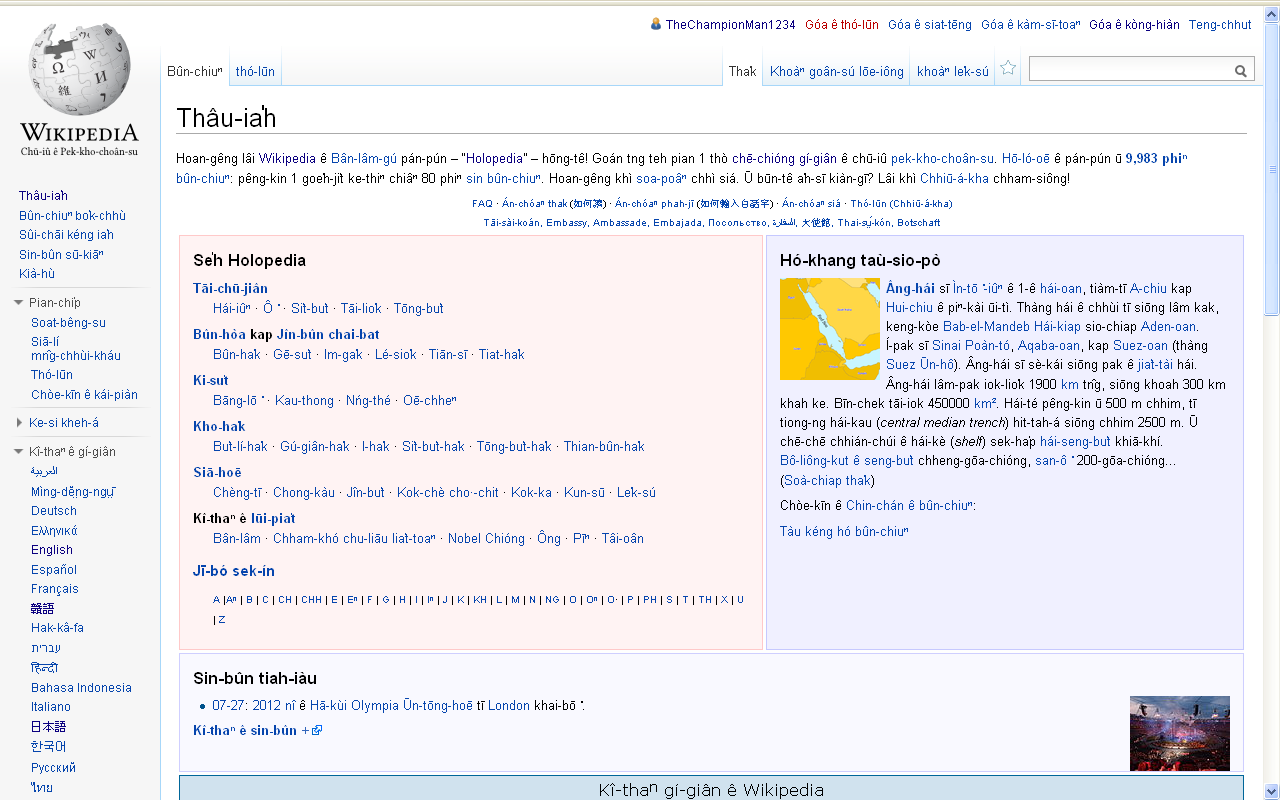
- Screenshot
- Website type: Internet encyclopedia project
- Available in: Southern Min
- Owner: Wikimedia Foundation
- Website: zh-min-nan.wikipedia.org
- Commercial: No
- Registration: Optional
- Launched: July 2003 (project established); 28 May 2004; 22 years ago (joined Wikipedia)
- Content license: Creative Commons Attribution/ Share-Alike 4.0 (most text also dual-licensed under GFDL); Media licensing varies

The Southern Min Wikipedia (Pe̍h-ōe-jī: Wikipedia Bân-lâm-gí), also known as Min Nan Wikipedia and Holopedia is the Southern Min edition of Wikipedia, the free encyclopedia. It is the second largest Wikipedia in a Chinese language, after Mandarin. Written in Pe̍h-ōe-jī (and sometimes Tâi-lô), with some articles having Hàn-jī versions, it mainly uses the Taiwanese Hokkien dialect. It currently has 434,643 articles.

== History ==
The Southern Min Wikipedia was founded as an independent project known as Holopedia (a reference to Hō-ló-oē, a colloquial name for the Southern Min dialect) by Wikipedians Pektiong (Tân Pe̍k-tiong) and Kaihsu (Tè Khái-sū) in 2003. Following one year of development, Holopedia was moved from Holopedia.net to the Southern Min Wikipedia, creating a Wikipedia project for the language. The Southern Min Wikipedia had 4,000 articles in 2004 and 11,000 articles in December 2013.

== ISO code ==
At the time of creation there was no ISO 639 code for Southern Min, so the founders decided to use "zh-min-nan", which had been registered as an IETF language tag. Now there is an ISO code for Southern Min (nan) and the domain http://nan.wikipedia.org redirects to http://zh-min-nan.wikipedia.org/.

The Southern Min Wikipedia is the only Wikipedia to have two hyphens in the code, although "be-x-old" was formerly used for the Belarusian Wikipedia in classical orthography.

In August 2015, the Wikipedians of Southern Min Wikipedia reached a new consensus to officially use "nan" as the language code; however, as of 2023, the consensus has not yet been executed.

== Analysis ==
With 200,000 articles in 2020, Southern Min Wikipedia is the Sinitic Wikipedia with the second-most articles. As its articles largely use the Roman alphabet, it is "the only Sinitic Wikipedia with virtually no Chinese characters". The scholar Henning Klöter wrote, "If we take the Holopedia not only as a sign of the vitality of alphabetically written Taiwanese, it turns out that today, like 20 years ago, governmental and non-governmental language planners still do not pull together, in terms of both intensity and substance. It has to be emphasised that individual non-governmental agency in language planning cannot be limited to the Holopedia community."

The Southern Min Wikipedia was the Sinitic Wikipedia with the largest increase in users, going from 39 to 119 between 2015 and 2017. The scholar Hongyuan Dong explained this said that numerous diaspora groups exist outside of mainland China such as in Southeast Asia, North America, and Europe, which enable those people to be unaffected by Internet censorship in China. Dong said that the expansion of Southern Min Wikipedia was owing to the Taiwan government and linguistic groups' standardization efforts for the language.

The Southern Min Wikipedia uses the phonetic alphabets Pe̍h-ōe-jī and Tâi-lô. The scholar Hongyuan Dong attributed this to three reasons. The first reason was political in that Min Nan speakers yearned for a singular identity that would substantially distinguish themselves from Mandarin Chinese. A phonetic alphabet accomplishes this. The second reason is that out of every Sinitic language, Southern Min perhaps had the best phonetic system, having spawned a substantial amount of written matter. The third reason was that Taiwan's homogenizing of Southern Min had very limited impact on non-Taiwanese speakers of the dialect. Dong concluded, "to reach a larger readership, a phonetic writing system does seem to have its advantage given the high internal homogeneity among the major Southern Min speaker communities".

== See also ==
- Wikipedia in other varieties of Chinese
- Taiwanese Hokkien
- Pe̍h-ōe-jī

== Bibliography ==
- Dong, Hongyuan (2017). Zhang, Lan (ed.). "Language Policy, Dialect Writing and Linguistic Diversity" (PDF). Proceedings of the 29th North American Conference on Chinese Linguistics (NACCL-29). Vol. 2. Ohio State University. pp. 463–480. Archived from the original (PDF) on 28 August 2023.
