= Yingjie Guo =

Yingjie Guo may refer to:

- Yingjie Guo (academic) (born 1957), professor of Chinese studies in Australia
- Yingjie Jay Guo (born 1958), communications engineer in Australia
