= Ákos Bertalan Apatóczky =

Hungarian Sinologist

Apatóczky Ákos Bertalan
- Born: 12 July 1974 (age 52); Budapest, Hungary
- Occupations: Sinologist, Mongolist, academician, translator, linguist
- Years active: present

Ákos Bertalan Apatóczky (simplified Chinese: 阿保矶; traditional Chinese: 阿保磯; pinyin: Ābǎojī); born 12 July 1974 in Budapest, Hungary is a Hungarian Sinologist and Mongolist, mostly known for his historical linguistic research on Middle Mongol sources written in Chinese script, currently Full Professor as the Chair of the Department of Chinese Studies at the Institute of Oriental Languages and Cultures (Károli Gáspár University (KRE)). Between 2020 and 2022 he worked as the leader of the KRE Sinology Research Group in Budapest, Hungary. He is an academician (regular member of the Academia Europaea), Doctor of Science (DSc) and secretary of the Committee on Oriental Studies at the Hungarian Academy of Sciences.

== Biography ==
Graduated with honours from the Faculty of Humanities at Eötvös Loránd University Budapest, (MA in Mongol Studies) in 1998. In 2002 he also received an MA in Chinese Studies at with “excellent” result. From 1998 to 2006 Apatóczky worked as a research fellow at the Hungarian Academy of Sciences, Department of Altaic Studies as a “junior researcher” grant fellow. Parallel he taught undergraduate courses in Chinese and Mongolian languages, history and linguistics at the Inner Asian Department, Eötvös Loránd University Budapest. In 2006 he defended his PhD dissertation at the Doctoral School in Linguistic Sciences Eötvös Loránd University. For his thesis ‘Yiyu. The Deciphering of a Sixteenth Century Sino-Mongol Glossary’ on Beilu Yiyu, Apatóczky was awarded a summa cum laude doctoral degree.

Among his most significant achievements are the reconstructed Middle Mongolian linguistic monuments written originally in Chinese script. Next to them he proved that almost the entire lexicon of the Sino-Mongol glossary included in the late Ming military treatise the Lulongsai lüe, the lexicon of which was thought to be the richest among the similar works until recently, was, in fact, copied from other earlier sources. All these sources were identified in his book in 2016, matching every single headword (more than 1.400) of the Lulongsai lüe glossary with its donor works' original headwords.

Next to his position at Károli Gáspár University he was also a guest lecturer at the Department of Altaistics at the University of Szeged from 2017 to 2020. In 2017 the degree of Dr. habil. (habilitated doctor) was conferred for his thesis by the Eötvös Loránd University. The same year he served as the president of the 60th Meeting of the Permanent International Altaistic Conference (PIAC). He was a recipient of the 2019 "Taiwan Fellowship" grant awarded by the Ministry of Foreign Affairs of the R.O.C. From 2020 he serves as the chair of the then newly established Department of Chinese Studies at the Institute of Oriental Languages and Cultures at his University. In 2022, he held the position of president of the PIAC Conference again during the 64th Meeting.

In 2019 he got elected as a regular member of Academia Europaea to the Section of Classics and Oriental Studies. In 2021 the Committee on Oriental Studies at the Hungarian Academy of Sciences elected him as the secretary of the committee. In 2026 he was awarded the Doctor of Science title by the Hungarian Academy of Sciences.

== Selected works ==
- Handle with Care! The Limits of Use of Manuscripts Demonstrated on the Hua-Yi yiyu Texts of the National Central Library. In: Khabtagaeva, Bayarma (et al eds.) Historical Linguistics and Philology of Central Asia: Essays in Turkic and Mongolic Studies. Leiden, Netherlands, Boston (MA), United States of America: Brill Academic Publishers (2022) 516 p. pp. 251–260.
- Preliminary Report on Louis Ligeti’s Khitan Wordlist: The Numerals. In: John, Kupchik; José, Andrés Alonso de la Fuente; Marc, Hideo Miyake (eds.) Studies in Asian Historical Linguistics. Philology and Beyond. Festschrift Presented to Alexander V. Vovin in Honor of His 60th Birthday. Leiden, Netherlands, Boston, United States of America: Brill Academic Publishers (2021) 337 p. pp. 160–174.
- Ideas behind symbols - languages behind scripts. SUA vol. 52. University of Szeged, 2019 (ed.)
- Early Mandarin profanity and its Middle Mongolian reflection in the vocabulary of the Wu Bei Zhi (武備志). In: Rocznik Orientalistyczny. 71: (2) pp. 9–38 (2019)
- Philology of the Grasslands. Brill, Leiden, Boston 2018. (co-edited with Christopher. P. Atwood)
- Recent developments on the decipherment of the Khitan Small Script. In: Acta Orientalia Academiae Scientiarum Hungaricae. 70: (2) pp. 109–133 (2017) (co-authored with Béla Kempf)
- The Translation Chapter of the Late Ming Lulongsai Lüe. Bilingual Sections of a Chinese Military Collection. Brill, Leiden, Boston 2016.
- Yiyu 譯語 (Beilu yiyu 北虜譯語). An indexed critical edition of a 16th century Sino-Mongolian glossary. Global Oriental Publishers, Brill, 2009.
- Kínai nyelv [Chinese language]. Chinese language textbook, teachers' edition (LITE language school). Budapest, 2011
- Dialectal Traces in Beilu yiyu. In: Rybatzki, Volker et al. (eds.): The early Mongols: language, culture and history; Studies in honor of Igor de Rachewiltz on the occasion of his 80. birthday. Indiana University Uralic and Altaic series/173, pp. 9–20, 2009.
- És a maradék... [The residue. Study on the history of Chinese mathematics] in: Crystal-Splendour: Essays presented in honour of Professor Kara György's 70th birthday. ELTE, Budapest, 2007.. Research Group for Altaic Studies, Department of Inner Asian Studies, 2007. pp. 25–34. Budapest, 2007.
- 关于蒙古语之主语标记的问题 [On the question of the subject markers of Mongolian], Wu Xinying 吴新英 and Chen Ganglong 陈岗龙 (ed.): 面向新世纪的蒙古学回顾与展望. Minzu publishing house, Beijing, 2005. pp. 322–343
- Yiyu (Beilu yiyu 北虜譯語): A Middle Mongolian glossary of the Dengtan Bijiu (登墰必究). In: Mongolica. Vol. 14 (35). pp. 368–374. Ulaanbaatar, 2004.

== Articles intended for the general public ==
- Schönbrunn kínai szobái [The Chinese rooms of Schönbrunn Palace, Vienna]. csk.blog.hu (website for popularized articles on oriental studies), 2012/12
- Zsoldos Imre 1931–2009 (Obituary) csk.blog.hu, 2009
- Mit mondott Mao? [What did Mao say? Historical essay] csk.blog.hu, 2009
- Randalírozás Mongóliában [Turmoil in Mongolia] In: Magyar Narancs, 2008/28, pp. 23–24
- Lin Piao zuhanása [The fall of Lin Biao. Historical essay] In: Népszabadság (leading daily newspaper of Hungary), 2001. October 2, p. 7
- Merre megy Tajvan? [Which direction is Taiwan going?] In: 168 óra, 2000. May 25. pp. 40–41
- Újkori mongoljárás [A new Mongol invasion] In: Új Keleti Szemle [New Oriental Review], 1998/1: pp. 55–58
- Illatos kikötő [The fragrant port. Political essay] In: Selyemút, August 1997, pp. 24–26
- Éhes tigris [Hungry tiger. Political essay] In: Selyemút, May 1997, pp. 27–30

== Film and multimedia ==
- 2015 translation of the Taiwanese documentary ’Yellow box’ (黃屋手記)
- 2005 2005 translation of the Taiwanese movie ‘A One and a Two’ (一一)
- 2003 translation of the Hong Kong movie ’So close’ (夕阳天使)
- 2003 specialist adviser for the translation of the Chinese movie ’The Hero’ (英雄)

== Honours ==
- 2019 Elected Member of the Academia Europaea (The Academy of Europe)
- 2020 Scientific Prize of Érd (awarded by the Assembly of the City of Érd)
- 2023 Szenczi Molnár Albert Prize

== Memberships ==
- Academia Europaea (The Academy of Europe) (ordinary member)
- Committee on Oriental Studies at the Hungarian Academy of Sciences (Secretary)
- International Journal of Eurasian Linguistics (BRILL) (member of the editorial board)
- Languages of Asia (BRILL) (member of the editorial board)
- European Association for Chinese Studies (member)
- American Association for Chinese Studies (member)
- President of the Permanent International Altaistic Conference (2017)
- International Association of Chinese Linguistics (member)
- Societas Uralo-Altaica (member)
- Hungarian Society of Linguistics (member)
- Public body of the Hungarian Academy of Sciences (member)
- Alexander Csoma de Kőrös Society (member)
- Doctoral School in Linguistics, University of Szeged (inspector)
- Károli Gáspár University, Doctoral School of History (supervisor, inspector)
- Eötvös Loránd University of Sciences, Doctoral School of Philosophy (supervisor, inspector)
- University of Szeged, Doctoral School of History (inspector)

== See also ==
- List of Sinologists
