= Robert Scholz (pianist) =

American classical composer

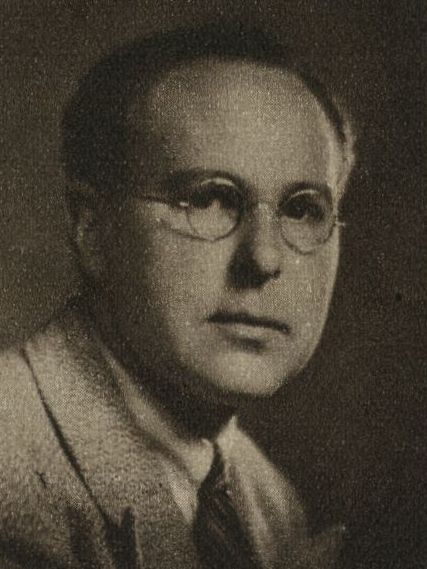
- Born: 16 October 1902; Steyr, Austrian-Hungary
- Died: 11 October 1986 (aged 83); Taipei, Taiwan
- Citizenship: Austria; United States
- Occupations: Pianist; conductor; composer; pedagogue

Robert Scholz (Chinese: 蕭滋; pinyin: Xiāo Zī; 16 October 1902 – 11 October 1986) was an Austrian-born American pianist, conductor, composer and teacher. He achieved fame as a pianist, especially in Austria during the Twenties and Thirties in a piano duo with his brother Heinz Scholz with whom he also published the first authoritative collection of Mozart's works for piano. After emigrating to the United States in 1938 he became a well-known conductor and founder of the American Chamber Orchestra in New York. In 1963 the US State Department invited him to teach in Taiwan as part of a scholarly exchange program. Here he achieved lasting fame as a conductor and especially as the founding father of Taiwan's piano tradition. Most influential piano professors in Taiwan today can trace their roots back to his teachings. He died in Taipei in 1986.

== Life ==
=== Genealogy ===
Robert Scholz was born in Steyr, Austria, on 16 October 1902. His father, Karl Scholz, was a store manager, his mother, Johanna Mayr, a soprano who met and corresponded with Anton Bruckner. His elder brother, the pianist Heinz Scholz (1897-1988), was president of the Mozarteum Salzburg in 1964. Some genealogical research of the Scholz family from 1750 until the present time has been undertaken by the composer Martin Fiala in Steyr.

=== Early Years in Austria ===
Scholz received his first piano lessons from his mother in 1906 but failed to find a more professional piano teacher in Steyr during the war years. Together with his brother Heinz he participated in charity concerts to raise funds for the Red Cross and to help the wounded. He graduated from high school ("Realschule") in 1920. In 1921 he took about ten piano lessons with Austrian pianist Friedrich Wührer in Vienna, each time traveling 16 hours from Steyr, and was later admitted to the Mozarteum in Salzburg where he studied with Felix Petyrek. After only ten lessons Scholz returned to Steyr studying without a teacher. Just nine months after he entered it, Scholz passed the Mozarteum's final exams in piano and composition with distinction ("mit Auszeichnung") and also received a teaching certificate. Subsequently he taught piano and composition at the Mozarteum from 1924-1937. In 1935 he even became the first teacher for harpsichord at an Austrian music college.

Robert and Heinz Scholz had a distinguished career as a piano duo which began with a European tour in 1923. They performed concertos for two pianos by Mozart, Robert Scholz himself and others with world famous conductors such as Clemens Krauss, Dimitri Mitropoulos in Athens, Herbert von Karajan in Aachen, Bruno Walter and Arturo Toscanini at the Salzburg Festival. During their tours till 1938, including tours in the US and Canada, they often performed a two-piano arrangement of Bach's The Art of Fugue by Erich Schwebsch. In 1937, the year when Robert Scholz received an Honorary professorship, he gave a recital on Mozart's original piano at Salzburg Residenz, a concert which was attended by Walter and Toscanini. In 1927 the Viennese Universal Edition commissioned the Scholz brothers to edit Mozart's piano works based on his manuscripts.

=== America ===
In 1938 Robert Scholz emigrated to the US settling in New York where he began to teach at the David Mannes Music School. During the same time he started teaching the eight-year old Martin Canin, who was to become a famous piano teacher and performer. The idea of Scholz was to bring Salzburg's music tradition to New York. Collaborating with violinists Ivan Galamian and Louis Persinger as well as pianist Isabelle Vengerova he founded a Mozart orchestra and later a chorus at the Music School of the Henry Street Settlement, a project that was intended to foster talented children from underprivileged backgrounds. Between 1945 and 1950 this orchestra and chorus performed annual concerts at New York Town Hall. Scholz, who took conducting lessons with George Szell in 1940 and taught in summer-camps together with Ivan Galamian, also collaborated with Bruno Walter and his orchestra.

Robert Scholz composed large-scale works during this period and arranged Bach's The Art of Fugue for orchestra. Having performed Bruckner's Fourth Symphony and Te Deum with the Mozart orchestra and chorus of the Henry Street Settlement he was presented with the Bruckner Medal of Honor on 12 March 1950 by the Bruckner Society of America. In 1953 Robert Scholz founded the professional American Chamber Orchestra with which he regularly appeared at New York Town Hall and toured the US and Canada. In 1956 he recorded various works by Mozart with this orchestra for Westminster Records, among others the Haffner Serenade and also recorded Mozart piano concertos with Dame Myra Hess.

=== Late Years in Taiwan ===
In 1963, through the recommendation of the US State Department and the Fulbright Program, Robert Scholz was invited to Taiwan where he would live until his death in 1986. He accepted a professorship for piano and chorus at Taiwan Provincial Teachers’ College (now National Taiwan Normal University). He also taught at the National Academy of Arts (now National Taiwan University of Arts) and later at the College of Chinese Culture ("Hwa Kang", now Chinese Culture University). Besides piano, which he also taught privately, Scholz taught conducting, chorus conducting, composition, theory and vocal accompaniment. Seminars were arranged by the United States Information Service. Taiwanese composer Hsu Tsang-Houei (許常惠) has called Robert Scholz a "missionary of music" and compared him to the French Jesuit missionary Amiot in Qing China.

Unlike in New York Scholz did not found an orchestra in Taiwan, but served as a principal and guest conductor of all leading local orchestras, especially the Taiwan Provincial Symphony Orchestra (now National Taiwan Symphony Orchestra), the Ministry of Defense Symphony Orchestra, but also school orchestras, building a foundation for their rehearsal methods, repertoire expansion, etc. Hsu Tsang-Houei wrote that Scholz "laid the foundation stone of orchestra culture in Taiwan". During his time in Taiwan he conducted numerous concerts and gala concerts collaborating with most leading local performers, such as pianists Francis Wu, Azusa Fujita and Liu Fu-Mei.

In 1969 Robert Scholz married Emane Wu (吳漪曼, Wu Yi-Man, 1931-2019), a well-known pianist and professor in Taiwan. Her father, Wu Bochao (吳伯超), was a famous Chinese composer who perished in the Taiping Steamer's voyage to Taiwan, 1949, while fleeing advancing Chinese Communist forces during the Chinese Civil War. Scholz later conducted his works. In 1970 Robert Scholz conducted the Tokyo Philharmonic Orchestra and accepted a professorship at Musashino Academy of Music whose orchestra and chorus he led as well. He returned to Taiwan in 1971. In 1973 he also appeared as a guest conductor in Seoul.

During the last years of his life Robert Scholz became interested in philosophical studies. His writings were compiled by Bernhard Fuehrer and Bernhard Pohl and posthumously published by the Robert Scholz Music Foundation as "Posthumous Works of Robert Scholz", in 8 volumes, 1993. On October 11, 1986, Robert Scholz died at the National Taiwan University Hospital in Taipei.

== Teaching ==
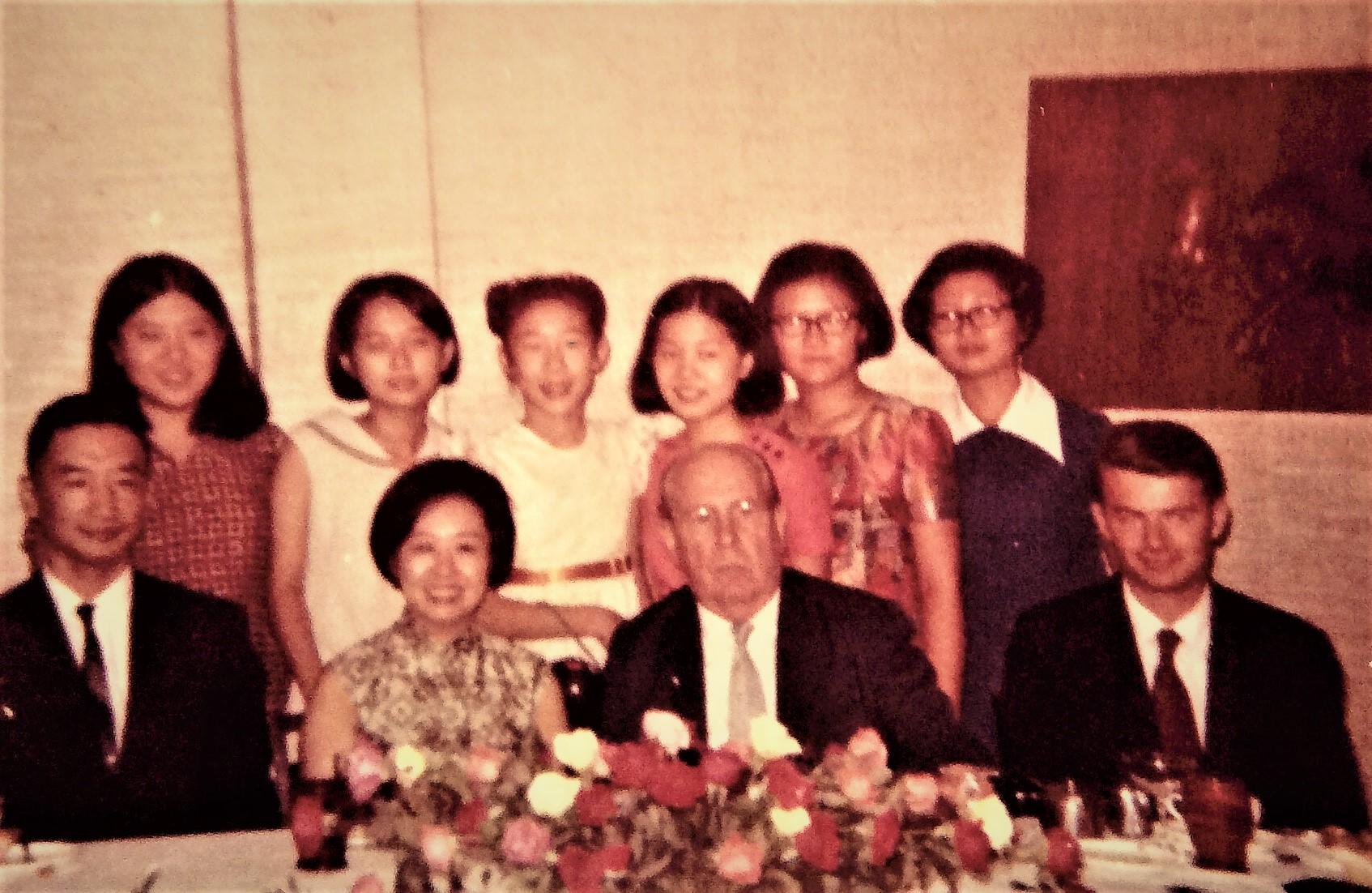
Robert Scholz and his wife with a group of his piano students about to leave for Austria in 1971

As a piano teacher Robert Scholz emphasized controlled breathing and watched the harmonious movement of the student's arm and body. He also insisted on notating phrasing, pedal marks and fingering in the score before the student learned the piece. Many students of Professor Scholz left Taiwan on a program organized by Taiwan's Ministry of Education as "gifted children" ("資賦優異天才兒童") before their sixteenth birthday to study in Austria or other countries and many of them are pianists today or leading professors in Taiwan and abroad, among others Tai-Cheng Chen, Se-Se Chang, Lucy Revers, Judy Chin, Han-An Liu, Lina Yeh, Lee-Hwei Wang. Conductors who studied with Professor Scholz include Felix Chen and Dau-Hsiong Tseng and composers Tyzen Hsiao.

== Works ==
Most important compositions and writings of Robert Scholz were published by the Robert Scholz Music Foundation and the R.O.C. National Committee of the Asian Composers League. His personal book collection and annotated musical scores were donated to the National Central Library by Emane Wu. These include personally annotated musical scores dating back to 1938, a 10-volume set of selected works, manuscripts on the thought of Prof. Scholz, musical recordings, and materials on the professor’s musical theory, biography, literature and lyrics.

=== Compositions ===
- Preludio-Chorale; Fughetta; Toccata for two pianos (1924)
- Country Tunes for Woodwind (1925)
- Concerto for 2 Pianos and Orchestra (1928)
- Andante and Allegro for Flute and Orchestra (1929)
- Suite for Orchestra (1932)
- Oriental Suite for Orchestra (1932)
- Oriental Suite for 2 Pianos (1932)
- Second Suite for Orchestra (1935)
- Adagio for Violoncello and Orchestra (1935)
- Epilogue for the Symphony in E (1937)
- The Art of the Fugue [Bach] orchestrated by Scholz (1950)
- Symphony in E (1951)

=== Musicological Essays ===
- The Art of the Fugue
- The Vibrating String
- Proportions
- The Alphabet – The Art of Writing Sounds

=== Philosophical Essays and Miscellaneous Notes ===
- Denkanregungen
- Miscellaneous Notes on Mathematics, Geometry, Numbers & Ciphers
- Miscellaneous Notes on Language & Linguistics
- Miscellaneous Notes on Denkanregungen

== Recordings ==
- Mozart, Wolfgang Amadeus. Haffner Serenade (Serenade No. 7 In D Major, K. 250). The American Chamber Orchestra, Robert Scholz, 1956. Label: Westminster – SWN 18164
- Mozart, Wolfgang Amadeus. Divertimento in D Major, K. 131. Cassation in B Flat Major, K. 99. The American Chamber Orchestra, Robert Scholz, 1956. Label: Westminster – SWN 18261
- Mozart, Wolfgang Amadeus. Piano Concerto No. 12 in A Major K. 414. Piano Concerto No. 27 in B Flat Major. Myra Hess [Myra Hess in Concert, 1949-1960, disk 2 of 4]. The American Chamber Orchestra, Robert Scholz, 20 March 1956. Label: Music and Arts Programs of America – CD-0779

== Bibliography ==
- Liu Lung-Kai, Chang Hui-Chung, eds. (2001). "Robert Scholz. Weltbürger der Musik. Ein Österreicher – in Taiwan verliebt. Seine Musik. Sein Wirken. Seine Lehren." Taipei: Robert Scholz Musikstiftung.
- Peng Shengjin (彭聖錦) (2002). "Robert Scholz. European. Taiwanese Soul." ("蕭滋：歐洲人台灣魂"). Taipei: Times Culture (時報文化). ISBN 957-01-2664-7.
