= Joshua Fogel =

American historian and sinologist

Joshua A. Fogel
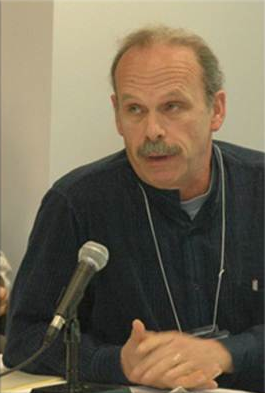
- Fogel in 2014
- Born: 1950 (age 75–76); Brooklyn, New York, U.S.
- Other name: 傅佛果
- Occupations: Historian, translator
- Spouse: Joan Judge (m. 1994)
- Children: 2

Academic background
- Education: University of Chicago (BA); Columbia University (MA, PhD)

Academic work
- Main interests: History of modern China, Chinese-Japanese relations
- Notable works: Maiden Voyage: The Senzaimaru and the Creation of Modern Sino-Japanese Relations (University of California Press, 2014); Politics and Sinology: The Case of Naitō Konan (1866–1934) (Council on East Asian Studies, Harvard University, 1984)

Joshua A. Fogel (Chinese: 傅佛果, born 1950) is an American-Canadian Sinologist, historian, and translator who specializes in the history of modern China, especially focusing on the cultural and political relations between China and Japan. Before retiring and becoming professor emeritus in 2024, he held a Tier 1 Canada Research Chair at York University in Toronto from 2005. Before that he taught at Harvard University (1981–1988) and the University of California, Santa Barbara (1989–2005). He is a fellow of the Royal Society of Canada (elected 2023).

In June 2024 he was honored with a Festschrift, presented to him at Heidelberg University, to which twenty-seven colleagues, former students, and friends contributed.

== Biography ==
Born in Brooklyn, New York, Fogel graduated from Berkeley High School in 1968, after becoming bar mitzvah at Congregation Beth Israel (Orthodox) in 1963 and winning the Berkeley yoyo championship (boys' division) in early 1965. His father, David Fogel, was a criminologist (PhD, UC Berkeley) and his mother, Muriel Fogel (née Finkelstein), was a homemaker and later a teacher in the Head Start Program in Chicago's inner city. He received his undergraduate education in Chinese history (under the guidance of Philip Kuhn) at the University of Chicago, graduating in 1972 with honors. He earned Masters (1973) and PhD (1980) degrees at Columbia University under C. Martin Wilbur and Wm. Theodore de Bary; during this period, he also did research at Kyoto University for eighteen months (December 1976-May 1978) where he studied with Takeuchi Minoru. He has published extensively in the field of Sino-Japanese relations, and maintains a lively interest in the field of translation, as well as amateur interest in Talmud.

He has been the recipient of grants from the Fulbright Foundation, the National Endowment for the Humanities, the Japanese Ministry of Education, the Japan Foundation, the American Council of Learned Societies, the Chiang Ching-kuo Foundation, and the Social Sciences and Humanities Research Council of Canada. He has held a number of visiting professorships, including one year at the Research Institute in the Humanities of Kyoto University (1996–1997) and the two-year Mellon Visiting Professor in East Asian History at the School of Historical Studies, Institute for Advanced Study (2001–2003) in Princeton, New Jersey. He was a visiting scholar at the École des hautes études en sciences sociales in Paris (June 2024) and at Erlangen University (November 2025). Since 2010, he has been an Honorary Senior Research Fellow at the Research Centre for Translation, Chinese University of Hong Kong.

He is the founding editor of the journal Sino-Japanese Studies (1988–2003, 2009–2020). In addition, he serves on the boards of a number of publication series and journals, such as the Journal of the History of Ideas and The Journal of Chinese History.

== Major publications ==
- Back to Babel: The Esperanto Movements in Japan and China (Harvard University Asia Center, forthcoming).
- A Friend in Deed: Lu Xun, Uchiyama Kanzō, and the Intellectual World of Shanghai on the Eve of War (Association for Asian Studies, 2019). ()
- Japanese for Sinologists: A Reading Primer with Glossaries and Translations (University of California Press, 2017).
- Between China and Japan: The Writings of Joshua Fogel (Brill, 2015).
- Maiden Voyage: The Senzaimaru and the Creation of Modern Sino-Japanese Relations (University of California Press, 2014). Russian translation: Anna Shlashkova, Первое плавание: путешествие «Сэндзаймару» и возникновение современных японо-китайских отношений (Academic Studies Press, 2024).
- Japanese Historiography and the Gold Seal of 57 C.E.: Relic, Text, Object, Fake (Brill, 2013).
- Articulating the Sinosphere: Sino-Japanese Relations in Space and Time (Harvard University Press, 2009). Harvard University Reischauer Lectures. (http://www.hup.harvard.edu/catalog.php?isbn=9780674032590)
- The Literature of Travel in the Japanese Rediscovery of China, 1862-1945 (Stanford University Press, 1996).
- The Cultural Dimension of Sino-Japanese Relations: Essays on the Nineteenth and Twentieth Centuries (M. E. Sharpe, 1994).
- Nakae Ushikichi in China: The Mourning of Spirit (Council on East Asian Studies, Harvard University, 1989). Japanese translation: Sakatani Yoshinao 阪谷芳直, Nakae Ushikichi to Chūgoku, ichi hyūmanisuto no sei to gakumon 中江丑吉と中国、ヒューマニストの生と学問 (Nakae Ushikichi and China, the life and scholarship of a humanist) (Iwanami shoten, 1992). Chinese translation: Deng Weiquan 邓伟权 and Ishii Tomoaki 石井知章, Zhongjiang Chouji zai Zhongguo 中江丑吉在中国 (Nakae Ushikichi in China) (Shangwu yinshuguan, 2011).
- Ai Ssu-ch'i's Contribution to the Development of Chinese Marxism (Council on East Asian Studies, Harvard University, 1987).
- Politics and Sinology: The Case of Naitō Konan (1866-1934) (Council on East Asian Studies, Harvard University, 1984). Japanese translation: Inoue Hiromasa 井上裕正, Naitō Konan, poritikkusu to shinorojii 内藤湖南、ポリティックスとシノロジー (Heibonsha, 1989); Chinese translation: Tao Demin 陶德民 and He Yingying 何英莺, Neiteng Hunan, zhengzhi yu Hanxue 内藤湖南，政治与汉学 (Jiangsu renmin chubanshe, 2016).
- Abstinence and Holiness, Embracing Self-Deprivation: Reading Tractate Nazir in the Babylonian Talmud (Hamilton Books, 2023).
- The Whole Megilla: Reading the Tractate on the Scroll of Esther in the Babylonian Talmud (Hamilton Books, 2022).
- Grains of Truth: Reading Tractate Menachot of the Babylonian Talmud (Hamilton Books, 2014).
- (Sacrifices) Left at the Altar: Reading Tractate Zevachim of the Babylonian Talmud (Hamilton Books, 2013).
- Decisions, Decisions, Decisions: Reading Tractate Horayot of the Babylonian Talmud (Hamilton Books, 2013).
- Daily Reflections on Idolatry: Reading Tractate Avodah Zarah of the Babylonian Talmud (Hamilton Books, 2012).

Edited volumes:

- Modern Japanese Art and China (Harvard University Asia Center, forthcoming). Co-editor with Tamaki Maeda.
- Translation Within a World of Chinese Characters: China, Japan, Korea, Vietnam (De Gruyter, forthcoming). Co-editor with Matthew Fraleigh.
- Time and Language: New Sinology and Chinese History (University of Hawai‘i Press, 2023). Co-editor with Ori Sela and Zvi Ben-dor Benite.
- Sino-Japanese Reflections: Literary and Cultural Interactions between China and Japan in Early Modernity (De Gruyter, 2022). Co-editor with Matthew Fraleigh.
- Voices from the Chinese Century: Public Intellectual Debate from Contemporary China (Columbia University Press, 2019). Co-editor with Timothy Cheek and David Ownby.
- The Role of Japan in Modern Chinese Art (University of California Press, 2012).
- Czernowitz at 100: The First Yiddish Language Conference in Historical Perspective (Rowman & Littlefield, Lexington Books, 2010). Co-editor with Kalman Weiser.
- Writing Histories in Japan: Texts and Their Transformations from Ancient Times through the Meiji Era (International Research Center for Japanese Studies, 2007). Co-editor with James Baxter.
- Crossing the Yellow Sea: Sino-Japanese Cultural Contacts, 1600-1950 (EastBridge, 2007).
- Traditions of East Asian Travel (Berghahn Books, 2006).
- The Teleology of the Modern Nation-State: Japan and China (University of Pennsylvania Press, 2004).
- The Role of Japan in Liang Qichao's Introduction of Modern Western Civilization to China (Institute of East Asian Studies, University of California, Berkeley, 2004).
- Late Qing China and Meiji Japan: Political and Cultural Aspects of Their Interactions (EastBridge, 2004).
- Historiography and Japanese Consciousness of Values and Norms (International Research Center for Japanese Studies, 2002). Co-editor with James Baxter.
- Sagacious Monks and Bloodthirsty Warriors: Chinese Views of Japan in the Ming-Qing Period (EastBridge, 2002).
- Encyclopedia of World History (Houghton Mifflin, 2001). Associate editor.
- The Nanjing Massacre in History and Historiography (University of California Press, 2000). Japanese translation: Okada Ryōnosuke 岡田良之助, Rekishi no naka no Nankin dai gyakusatsu 歴史のなかの南京大虐殺 (Kashiwa shobō, 2000).
- Imagining the People: Chinese Intellectuals and the Concept of Citizenship, 1890-1920 (M. E. Sharpe, 1997). Co-editor with Peter Zarrow.
- Japanese Travelogues of China in the 1920s: The Accounts of Akutagawa Ryūnosuke and Tanizaki Jun'ichirō (M. E. Sharpe, 1997).
- Meeting of Minds: Intellectual and Religious Interaction in East Asian Traditions of Thought (Columbia University Press, 1997). Co-editor with Irene Bloom.
- Chinese Women in a Century of Revolution, 1850–1950, by Ono Kazuko 小野和子 (Stanford University Press, 1989). Editor/translator.
- Perspectives on a Changing China: Essays in Honor of Professor C. Martin Wilbur on the Occasion of His Retirement (Westview, 1979). Co-editor with William T. Rowe.

And, forty-one volumes of translation from Chinese, Japanese, and Yiddish, including the following:

- Lin Zexu (De Gruyter, 2026). Translation of Rin Sokujo 林則徐 by Inoue Hiromasa 井上裕正.
- Kyoto School Sinology: The Next Generation (De Gruyter).
- Lu Xun (University of Hawai‘i Press, 2026). Translation of Ro Jun 魯迅 by Takeuchi Yoshimi 竹内好.
- Leḳsikon fun der haynṭtsayṭiker yidisher literatur לעקסיקאָן פֿון דער הײַנטצײַטיקער ייִדישער ליטעראַטור (Tel Aviv, 2025). ; ed. Velvl Tshernin.
- New-Russia: Images from a Journey (Jerusalem: The Toby Press, 2026). Translation of Nay-Rusland: Bilder fun a rayze נײַ-רוסלאַנד: בילדער פֿון אַ רײַזע by Israel Joshua Singer ישראל-יהושע זינגער; previously in Israel Joshua Singer: Collected Stories, Novellas, and Selected Reportage (The Toby Press, 2024), 833-1053.
- Vietnam: On the Eve of “Prosperity” (De Gruyter, 2025). Translation of Vetonamu: “Yutakasa” e no yoake ヴェトナム : 「豊かさ」への夜明け by Tsuboi Yoshiharu 坪井喜明.
- The Last Embassy to Tang China (Chinese University of Hong Kong Press, 2025). Translation of Saigo no ken-Tōshi 最後の遣唐使 by Saeki Arikiyo 佐伯有清.
- Literature and History in the Shi ji of Sima Qian (Chinese University of Hong Kong Press, 2024). Translation of writings by Miyazaki Ichisada 宮崎市定 on the Shi ji 史記.
- How the Red Star Rose: Edgar Snow and Early Images of Mao Zedong Archived 2023-02-16 at the Wayback Machine (Chinese University of Hong Kong Press, 2022). Translation of Akai hoshi wa ika ni shite nobotta ka? Shirarezaru Mō Takutō no shoki imēji 赤い星は如何にして昇ったか：知られざる毛沢東の初期イメージ by Ishikawa Yoshihiro 石川禎浩.
- Willy: A Novella (Hamilton Books, 2020). Translation of Vili װילי by I. J. Singer.
- Treatise on the People of Wa in the Chronicle of the Kingdom of Wei: The World's Earliest Written Text on Japan (MerwinAsia, 2018). Translation of Gishi Wajinden o yomu 魏志倭人伝を読む by Saeki Arikiyo 佐伯有清 (2 vols.).
- Leksikon fun der nayer yidisher literatur לעקסיקאָן פֿון דער נײַער ייִדישער ליטעראַטור (Biographical dictionary of modern Yiddish literature), vol. 1 (alef-beys), vol. 2 (gimel-dalet), vol. 3 (hey-khes), vol. 4 (khes-lamed), vol. 5 (lamed-mem), vol. 6 (mem-ayin), vol. 7 (pey-tsadek), and vol. 8 (kuf-tof). Online at yleksikon.blogspot.com.
- Leksikon fun yidish-shraybers לעקסיקאָן פֿון ייִדישע שרײַבערס (Biographical dictionary of Yiddish writers), comp. Berl Kagan (New York, 1986). Online at yleksikon.blogspot.com
- Leksikon fun yidishe shrayber in ratn-farband לעקסיקאָן פֿון יִידישע שרײַבער אין ראַטן־פֿאַרבאַנד (Biographical dictionary of Yiddish writers in the Soviet Union) by Chaim Beider, ed. Boris Sandler and Gennady Estraikh (New York: Congress for Jewish Culture, Inc., 2011). Online at yleksikon.blogspot.ca
- The Emergence of the Modern Sino-Japanese Lexicon: Seven Studies (Brill, 2015).
- Shimada Kenji: Scholar, Thinker, Reader: Selected Writings on the Intellectual History of Modern China (MerwinAsia, 2014). Translations of essays by Shimada Kenji 島田虔次.
- Just a Scholar: The Memoirs of Zhou Yiliang Archived 2017-09-01 at the Wayback Machine (Brill, 2013). Translation of Bijing shi shusheng 毕竟是书生 by Zhou Yiliang 周一良.
- The Formation of the Chinese Communist Party (Columbia University Press, 2012). Translation of Chūgoku Kyōsantō seiritsu shi 中国共産党成立史 by Ishikawa Yoshihiro 石川禎浩.
- Demon Capital Shanghai: The "Modern" Experience of Japanese Intellectuals (MerwinAsia, 2012). Translation of Mato Shanhai: Nihon chishikijin no 'kindai' taiken 魔都上海、日本知識人の「近代」体験 by Liu Jianhui 劉建輝.
- Books and Boats: Sino-Japanese Relations in the Seventeenth and Eighteenth Centuries (MerwinAsia, 2012). Translation of Edo jidai no Nit-Chū hiwa 江戶時代の日中秘話 by Ōba Osamu 大庭脩.
- The Blue Wolf: A Novel of the Life of Chinggis Khan (Columbia University Press, 2008). Translation of Aoki ōkami 蒼き狼 by Inoue Yasushi 井上靖.
- Chronicle of the Tatar Whirlwind: A Novel of Seventeenth-Century East Asia (Floating World Editions, 2007). Translation of Dattan shippūroku 韃靼疾風錄 by Shiba Ryōtarō 司馬遼太郎.
- Manchuria under Japanese Dominion. University of Pennsylvania Press. 2006. Archived from the original on November 18, 2005.
- Travels in Manchuria and Mongolia: A Feminist Poet from Japan Encounters Prewar China (Columbia University Press, 2001). Translation of Man-Mō yūki 満蒙遊記 by Yosano Akiko 与謝野晶子. Spanish translation of the English by Dora Sales Salvador, Viajes por Manchuria y Mongolia (Madrid: La Línea del Horizonte Ediciones, 2021).
- The Taiping Rebellion (M. E. Sharpe, 2001). Translation of Taihei tengoku 太平天国 by Chin Shunshin 陳舜臣.
- Japan and China: Mutual Representations in the Modern Era (Curzon Press, 2000). Translation of Seigaku tōzen to Chūgoku jijō: 'zassho' sakki 西学東漸と中囯亊情 : "雑書" 札記 by Masuda Wataru 增田涉.
- Pioneer of the Chinese Revolution: Zhang Binglin and Confucianism (Stanford University Press, 1990). Translation of several works by Shimada Kenji 島田虔次.
- Bilingualism in the History of Jewish Literature (University Press of America, 1990). Translation of Di tsveyshprakhikeyt fun undzer literatur די צוויישפּראַכיקייט פֿון אונדזער ליטעראַטור by Shmuel Niger שמואל ניגער.
- Recent Japanese Studies of Modern Chinese History (II) (M. E. Sharpe, 1989). Translations from the journal Shigaku zasshi 史學雜誌 (1983–86), surveying Japanese writings on Chinese history (Ming through 20th century).
- Life along the South Manchurian Railway: The Memoirs of Itō Takeo (M. E. Sharpe, 1988). Translation of Mantetsu ni ikite 満鉄に生きて by Itō Takeo 伊藤武雄.
- Murder in a Peking Studio (Arizona State University Press, 1986). Translation of Pekin yūyūkan 北京悠々館 by Chin Shunshin 陳舜臣.
- Medieval Chinese Society and the Local 'Community' (University of California Press, 1985). Translation of Chūgoku chūsei shakai to kyōdōtai 中国中世社会と共同体 by Tanigawa Michio 谷川道雄.
- Recent Japanese Studies of Modern Chinese History (M. E. Sharpe, 1984). Translations from the journal Shigaku zasshi 史學雜誌 (1978–82), surveying Japanese writings on Chinese history (Ming through 20th century).
- Naitō Konan and the Development of the Conception of Modernity in Chinese History (M. E. Sharpe, 1983). Translations from the major writings of Naitō Konan 内藤湖南.

In addition, he is the author or translator of over 400 articles, book chapters, or major reviews.

== Personal life ==
Fogel has been married since 1994 to Joan Judge, professor of Chinese history at York University and winner of the Fairbank Prize (2026); they have two daughters: Antigone (b. 1998) and Avital (b. 2001).
