= William T. Rowe =

American historian of China

William Townsend Rowe (b. Brooklyn, New York, 24 July 1947) is a historian of China, and the John and Diane Cooke Professor of Chinese History within the Department of History at Johns Hopkins University. He considers himself a social historian of modern China, with both "social" and "modern" very broadly conceived, and works on every century from the 14th to the 20th.

== Education and career ==
William T. Rowe grew up in Brooklyn, New York, where his father was president of a small local savings bank. He attended Wesleyan University in Connecticut, where he majored in English, taking his A.B. in 1967. He later confessed that although he learned a great deal, he didn't do the assigned reading. After graduating college, he was drafted and entered Officer Candidate School. He served as a U.S. Naval Officer between 1968–71. He first served in Newport, Rhode Island as a communications officer and was then assigned to a riverboat squadron in Vietnam. However, the squadron was lost before he could join it.

He was reassigned to Subic Bay, the major United States base in the Philippines. Riding in a military bus, all along the side of the road he saw farmers plowing fields with water buffalo. "I could have been on Mars. I had no idea people still did that," he recalled. He spent the rest of his tour in the base library reading about Asia. When he returned home, he took a job as a construction worker, but quit to attend a summer school class in Chinese language at Columbia University. The language instructor insisted that he join the university's graduate program, where he studied with C. Martin Wilbur. He finished his degree in 1980, and taught briefly at University of North Carolina, Charlotte. In 1982, he joined Johns Hopkins University, where he was the only scholar on China in the history department for most of his career.

== Reception and influence ==
Rowe's scholarship on specialized topics in Qing history contributes to larger questions. Rowe's initial two volumes on the mid-Yangzi commercial city of Hankow during the Qing dynasty set out to show how capitalist organization, political institutions, and legal self-regulation were present, just as they were in the West. They were welcomed as contributions to the debate on whether urbanization was much the same historical process around the world or whether the city played different roles in each society. David Buck, writing in the Journal of Asian Studies, called the first volume "a landmark in the study of Chinese urbanism and capitalism," showing him to be "an historian of great talent."

Reviewers endorsed Rowe's challenges to earlier interpretations. The sociologist Max Weber wrote early in the 20th century that in effect the city in China played no role at all, for cities in China were not cities in the Western sense; they were merely seats of administrative power, not self-governing organizations. In the West, argued Weberians, cities were centers of the emerging bourgeoisie, rational behavior, and economic development. Buck writes that Rowe's works also oppose two other orthodox arguments. One, common in Marxist histories, saw the business class in late imperial China as being so "feudal" and oppressive that Chinese capitalism was suppressed. The second, common among Western observers, was that the development of Chinese capitalism derived from the impact of the West. Susan Mann wrote in the Journal of Urban History that "on every count, as Rowe conclusively demonstrates, the history of Hankow between 1706 and 1890 proves Weber wrong." Hankow's merchants and urban citizens developed independent of foreign inspiration, though indirectly affected by foreign trade along the coast.

== Personal life ==
In 1980, he married Jill A. Friedman, whom he met in Chinese language class. They have a son, Joshua, born 1983 and a daughter, Sara, born 1986.

== Grants and honors ==
Committee on Scholarly Communication with China, Research Grant, 1993–94. Research conducted in Beijing and Guilin, China. Guggenheim Fellowship, 1986–87. Research conducted in Taiwan. From 1992 to 2007, he was Editor, Late Imperial China.

== Selected publications ==
=== Books ===
- Hankow: Commerce and Society in a Chinese City, 1796–1889, Stanford University Press, 1984
- Hankow: Conflict and Community in a Chinese City, 1796–1895, Stanford University Press, 1989
- Saving the World: Chen Hongmou and Elite Consciousness in Eighteenth-Century China, Stanford University Press, 2001. ISBN 0804737355
- Crimson Rain: Seven Centuries of Violence in a Chinese County, Stanford University Press, 2007, ISBN 0804754969
- China's Last Empire: The Great Qing, Belknap Press of Harvard University Press, 2009, ISBN 978-0674036123
- Speaking of Profit: Bao Shichen and Reform in Nineteenth-century China, Harvard University Asia Center, 2018 ISBN 978-0674983809

=== Chapters and articles ===
- “Owen Lattimore, Asia, and Comparative History,” Journal of Asian Studies 66.3 (August 2007).
- ——— (2006), "The Things I've Found True: William Rowe – East Asian Scholar", The Johns Hopkins News-Letter, February 16
- "The Problem of 'Civil Society' in Late Imperial China," Modern China 19.2 (April 1993). Chinese language version: "Wan-Qing diguo de 'shimin shehui' de wenti," in Deng Zhenglai and J.C. Alexander, eds., Guojia yu shimin shehui (State and civil society), Beijing: Central Compilation and Translation Press, 1998.
- "China and the World, 1500-1800," in Ainslie Embree and Carol Gluck, eds., Asia in Western and World History, Armonk NY: M.E. Sharpe, 1997.
- "The Public Sphere in Modern China," Modern China 16.3 (July 1990). "China's Modern Social History in Comparative Perspective," in Paul S. Ropp, ed., Heritage of China: Contemporary Perspectives on Chinese Civilization, Berkeley: University of California Press, 1990.
- "John King Fairbank," in John Cannon, et al., eds., The Blackwell Dictionary of Historians, Oxford: Basil Blackwell, 1988.
- "Approaches to Modern Chinese Social History," in Olivier Zunz, ed., Reliving the Past: The Worlds of Social History, Chapel Hill: University of North Carolina Press, 1985.
- "Social Stability and Social Change," in Willard Peterson, ed., The Cambridge History of China, Volume 9, Early Ch'ing. Cambridge: Cambridge University Press, 2002.
- Translations with commentary of works by Gu Yanwu and Chen Hongmou, in Wm. Theodore de Bary and Richard Lufrano, eds., Sources of Chinese Tradition, Volume 2, revised edition, New York: Columbia University Press, 1999.
- "Interregional Trade in Eighteenth-Century China," in Leonard Blussé and Femme Gaastra, eds., On the Eighteenth Century as a Category of Asian History, Aldershot: Ashgate, 1998.
