= Timothy C. Wong =

American academic and Sinologist (born 1941)

Timothy C. Wong Chinese: 黃宗泰; pinyin: Huáng Zōngtài; Wade–Giles: Huang Tsung-t'ai (born 24 January 1941), is a Sinological translator and literary theorist of traditional Chinese fictional narratives and the Chinese efforts to Westernize and politicize their modern counterparts into what everyone now equates with "novels."

== See also ==
- List of Sinologists
