= Jean-Pierre Drège =

French sinologist

- Born: 11 March 1946 (age 80); Troyes, France
- Education: University of Burgundy, Institut national des langues et civilisations orientales
- Occupations: Sinologist, specialist in Dunhuangology
- Employer(s): French School of the Far East, École pratique des hautes études
- Notable work: Marco Polo et la Route de la Soie; Les bibliothèques en Chine au temps des manuscrits : Jusqu'au X^{e} siècle; Images de Dunhuang : Dessins et peintures sur papier des fonds Pelliot et Stein

Jean-Pierre Drège (born 11 March 1946) is a French sinologist, specialising in the study of ancient books and the history of libraries, in particular Chinese manuscripts and Dunhuangology. He has been working for years in the study of the Dunhuang manuscripts.

== Career ==
In his early years, Jean-Pierre Drège studied philosophy at the University of Dijon, and then transferred to the Institut national des langues et civilisations orientales to study Chinese. He has a keen interest in the history of books, which has also become his research theme.

In 1976, he completed an essay La «Commercial Press» de Shanghai, 1897-1949 on China's publishing industry in the first half of the 20th century, and immediately began to study history of libraries and library classification. He joined the French School of the Far East in 1980 and served as the Director of the School from 1998 to 2004.

He was in charge of the management of the research team on the Dunhuang manuscripts in 1993, under the supervision of Michel Soymié, with the purpose of cataloguing the manuscripts that Paul Pelliot took to Paris. He has also been the director of the collection "Bibliothèque de l'Institut des Hautes Études chinoises". He is currently an emeritus Director of Studies of the École pratique des hautes études.

== Publications ==
- La « Commercial Press » de Shanghai (1897-1949), Collège de France, Institut des hautes études chinoises, Paris, 283 pp., 1978.
- Marco Polo et la Route de la Soie, collection « Découvertes Gallimard » (nº 53), série Histoire. Éditions Gallimard, Paris, 192 pp., 1989.
- La Révolution du livre dans la Chine moderne, Wang Yunwu éditeur (in collaboration with Hua Chang-ming), Publications orientalistes de France, Paris, 144 pp., 1989.
- Les Bibliothèques en Chine au temps des manuscrits, École française d'Extrême-Orient, Paris, 322 pp., 1991.
- Qu'est-ce que la Dunhuangologie ? Paul Pelliot et les manuscrits de Dunhuang, 1999 (conference paper)

In collaboration

- (with various authors) De Dunhuang au Japon : Études chinoises et bouddhiques offertes à Michel Soymié, Droz, Genève, 1996.
- (with Michel Soymié, Sarah E. Fraser, Stephen F. Teiser and Danielle Eliasberg) Images de Dunhuang : Dessins et peintures sur papier des fonds Pelliot et Stein, collection « Mémoires archéologiques » (nº 24). École française d’Extrême-Orient, Paris, 1999.

== See also ==
- Corinne Debaine-Francfort
