= Chinaknowledge =

Hobbyist encyclopedic website maintained by Ulrich Theobald

ChinaKnowledge
- Website type: Informational / Hobbyist
- Creator: Dr. Ulrich Theobald
- Website: www.chinaknowledge.de
- Commercial: non-commercial
- Launched: 2001

Chinaknowledge, with the subtitle "a universal guide for China studies", is an English-language hobbyist's web site that contains a wide variety of information on China and Chinese topics. The site was founded by and is maintained by Ulrich Theobald, a Lecturer for Chinese History and Classical Chinese at the University of Tübingen, where he received his doctorate in Chinese Studies in 2009.

The site is frequently used as a citation source for facts presented elsewhere since it is not commercial and site's author states all his sites are freely visible and copyable. However, the site's author states, "When writing papers, students should use books and not the internet."

Chinaknowledge.de provides information about Chinese history and culture to a wide public, from academicians and high-school pupils to the interested "layman". Chinaknowledge concentrates on certain aspects insufficiently dealt with by other sources, especially traditional literature, biographies, historical terms, economic history.

The author identifies Chinaknowledge as a non-commercial endeavor and pledges that he will "not make any advertisements for profit-oriented companies on my site."
