= Deng Zhenglai =

Chinese jurist and translator (1956–2013)

Deng Zhenglai (Chinese: 邓正来; February 24, 1956 – January 24, 2013) was a Chinese political scientist, legal scholar, and translator known for his contributions to social science research, political philosophy, and the introduction of Western social science thought into contemporary Chinese academic discourse. His work spanned legal philosophy, political theory, and sociology of knowledge.

== Biography ==
Deng was born on February 24, 1956 in Shanghai. He graduated from Sichuan International Studies University and later studied at the China Foreign Affairs University. Deng became known as a significant figure in Chinese social sciences through his academic work, translations, and efforts to promote legal and political philosophical scholarship.

In the 1980s and 1990s, Deng played a role in introducing and interpreting the ideas of Western thinkers, particularly Austrian economist and philosopher Friedrich Hayek, to Chinese intellectual circles. His scholarship sought to engage with contemporary Chinese social issues through frameworks derived from Western social sciences.

Throughout his career, Deng held various academic positions, including teaching posts and leadership roles at universities such as Jilin University and Fudan University, where he was a professor and director of research institutes. He also served as editor or founder of multiple academic journals focused on social science, political philosophy, and legal philosophy.

Deng died on January 24, 2013, in Shanghai at the age of 56 from stomach cancer.
