= Maria Adele Carrai =

Sinologist and political scientist at Oxford University

Maria Adele Carrai is an Italian American sinologist, political scientist, and scholar of international law, specialising in China's rise as a global power, digital governance, and the history of international law in East Asia. She is Associate Professor in Politics and International Relations of China at the University of Oxford's Department of Politics and International Relations and the Oxford School of Global and Area Studies, and a Fellow of St Cross College, Oxford.

She is the founder and Executive Director of Mapping Global China, a research initiative combining geospatial data and narrative storytelling to document China's global presence, supported by the British Academy, the Carnegie Corporation of New York, the Ford Foundation, and New York University.

== Education and Early Career ==
Carrai holds a Bachelor of Arts from Sapienza University of Rome, as well as Master of Arts degrees from Ca' Foscari University of Venice and the University of Bologna. She completed her Ph.D. at the University of Hong Kong.

Prior to her appointment at Oxford, Carrai served as an Assistant Professor of Global China Studies at NYU Shanghai. She has also held numerous prestigious research fellowships throughout her career. Notably, she was awarded a three-year Marie Skłodowska-Curie Fellowship at KU Leuven— a competitive individual research fellowships funded by the European Commission and she held fellowships at the Harvard University Asia Center, Columbia University's Italian Academy, the Princeton-Harvard China and the World Program, the Max Weber Programme of the European University Institute in Florence, and the New York University School of Law.

== Academic Research and Public Engagement ==
Carrai's primary academic research focuses on the history of international law in East Asia and the conceptual history of Chinese foreign relations. Her work critically investigates how China’s rise as a global power shapes international norms and redefines the global distribution of power. She extensively researches the economic, legal, and political repercussions of Chinese global investments, specifically examining the Belt and Road Initiative (BRI) and its broader impact on international institutions and global governance.

Beyond her scholarly work, Carrai is an active public intellectual and a TED Fellow. Her geopolitical analyses and expert commentary on China's international relations and global economic strategies are frequently featured in major international media outlets, including The Wall Street Journal, The New York Times, Bloomberg, Reuters, the BBC, and the South China Morning Post.

Carrai is the founder and Executive Director of Mapping Global China, a public-facing research initiative that produces maps, datasets, and narrative outputs to document and analyse China's presence worldwide. The project has received funding from the British Academy, the Carnegie Corporation of New York, the Ford Foundation, and New York University.

== Selected Publications ==
Books

- The Cambridge History of International Law in Asia (Co-editor). Cambridge University Press, 2026 (forthcoming).
- The China Questions 2: Critical Insights into US-China Relations (Co-editor). Harvard University Press, 2022.
- The Belt and Road Initiative and Global Governance (Co-editor with Jean-Christophe Defraigne and Jan Wouters). Edward Elgar Publishing, 2020.
- Sovereignty in China: A Genealogy of a Concept Since 1840. Cambridge University Press, 2019.

Selected Academic Articles

- "Adaptive Governance along Chinese-Financed BRI Railroad Megaprojects in East Africa." World Development 141 (2021).
- "The rise of screening mechanisms in the global north: weaponizing the law against China's weaponized investments?" The Chinese Journal of Comparative Law (2020).
- "China's Malleable Sovereignty Along the Belt and Road Initiative: The Case of the 99-year Chinese Lease of Hambantota Port." NYU Journal of International Law & Politics 51 (2019).
- "Which Humanity? From Cultural to Racial Ethnocentrism: The Chinese Perspective on Universal History on the Threshold of the Twentieth Century." Telos 186 (2019).
- "Chinese Political Nostalgia and Xi Jinping's Dream of Great Rejuvenation." International Journal of Asian Studies (2019).
- "Learning Western Techniques of Empire: Republican China and the New Legal Framework for Managing Tibet." Leiden Journal of International Law 30, no. 4 (2017).
- "It Is Not the End of History: The Financing Institutions of the Belt and Road Initiative and the Bretton Woods System." In Julien Chaisse and Jędrzej Górski (eds.), The Belt and Road Initiative: Law, Economics and Politics. Brill, 2018.
- "Current Chinese Approaches to a Global History of International Law." Storica 22 (2017).
