= C. Martin Wilbur =

American historian

Clarence Martin Wilbur (1908 – June 18, 1997) was an American sinologist. He was the George Sansom Professor of Chinese History at Columbia University from 1947 to 1976.

== Biography ==
Born in Dayton, Ohio, Wilbur went at an early age with his parents to China, where they worked with the YMCA. He returned to Ohio for college, graduating from Oberlin College in 1931. His first job after receiving his Ph.D. from Columbia University in 1941 was with the Field Museum, in Chicago, where he prepared for publication a study of plant migration left by Berthold Laufer after his death and developed a monograph on slavery in the Han dynasty.

After moving to Columbia University in 1947, he was instrumental in turning the graduate program into one of the nation's leading programs and supervised many graduate students. He was also active in building the study of China as a profession, and in 1971 was elected president of the Association for Asian Studies. His focus of research was Republican China, especially the career of Sun Yatsen and the rise of the Nationalist Party. He was also a central figure in organizing the Columbia Oral History Project.

Upon his retirement in 1976, his students presented him with Perspectives on a Changing China: Essays in Honor of Professor C. Martin Wilbur on the Occasion of His Retirement ed. by Joshua A. Fogel and William T. Rowe, Westview Press (1979) ISBN 978-0-89158-091-1

== Major publications ==
- Berthold Laufer, C. Martin Wilbur, The American Plant Migration (Chicago, 1938. Anthropological Series. Field Museum of Natural History, V. 28, No. 1 Publication 418). ISBN 978-0-527-01888-7.
- C. Martin Wilbur, Slavery in China During the Former Han Dynasty, 206 B.C.-A.D. 25 ([Chicago, 1943. Field Museum of Natural History. Publication, 525). 490p. OCLC 615419001; reprinted, New York: Russell & Russell, 1967 OCLC 2118215.
- C. Martin Wilbur, Sun Yat-Sen, Frustrated Patriot, Columbia University Press (1976) ISBN 978-0-231-04036-5.
- C. Martin Wilbur, The Nationalist Revolution in China, 1923–1928 (Cambridge; New York: Cambridge University Press, 1984). ISBN 978-0-521-31864-8. First published 1983 as chapter 11 of John K. Fairbank, ed., The Cambridge History of China, volume 12.
- C. Martin Wilbur and Julie Lien-ying How, Missionaries of Revolution: Soviet Advisers and Nationalist China, 1920–1927, Harvard University Press (1989) ISBN 978-0-674-57652-0
- China in My Life: An Historian's Own History, (edited by Anita M. O'Brien) M.E. Sharpe (1996) ISBN 978-1-56324-763-7

== References and further reading ==
- Chu, Samuel C. (1999). "C. Martin Wilbur, 1908-1997". Chinese Studies in History. 33 (1): 39–40. doi:10.2753/CSH0009-4633330139.
- Rowe, William., Fogel, Joshua, & Zelin, Madeleine (1997). C. Martin Wilbur (1907–1997). The Journal of Asian Studies, 56(3), 878-878. doi:10.1017/S0021911800035282
- Madeleine Zelin, "C. Martin Wilbur May 13, 1908—June 18, 1997," Chinese Studies in History 33.1 (1999/10/01 1999): 91-93. https://doi.org/10.2753/CSH0009-4633330191
