= Ulrich Theobald =

German sinologist

Ulrich Theobald is a German sinologist at the University of Tübingen.

== Biography ==
Theobald received his MA in sinology from the University of Tübingen in 2000, followed by an MBA from Reutlingen University in 2002. He started as a lecturer in the Department of Chinese and Korean Studies at Tübingen in 2003, studying for his Ph.D. under Hans Ulrich Vogel (Sinologe); he received his Ph.D. in 2009 with his thesis The Second Jinchuan Campaign (1771 – 1776): Economic, Social and Political Aspects of an Important Qing Period Border War. In 2016 he was promoted to senior lecturer.

Theobald was the co-editor of Brill's East Asian Science, Technology, and Medicine journal from 2014 to 2016.

== Selected works ==
=== Books ===
- Theobald, Ulrich (2013). War Finance and Logistics in Late Imperial China: A Study of the Second Jinchuan Campaign (1771–1776). Brill. ISBN 978-90-04-25567-8.
- Leonard, Jane Kate; Theobald, Ulrich, eds. (2015). Money in Asia (1200 – 1900): Small Currencies in Social and Political Contexts. Brill. ISBN 978-90-04-28835-5.
- Theobald, Ulrich; Cao, Jin, eds. (2018). Southwest China in a Regional and Global Perspective (c. 1600-1911): Metals, Transport, Trade and Society. Brill. ISBN 978-90-04-35363-3.

=== ChinaKnowledge.de ===
Theobald runs the ChinaKnowledge.de website, an online encyclopedia of Chinese history and literature. The website appears on several undergraduate study guides: the Australian National University noted that it was useful because its content was largely derived from Chinese language secondary sources; Smith College wrote that it was a "good first place to checks texts or names to get background information".
