= Manuel Vermeer =

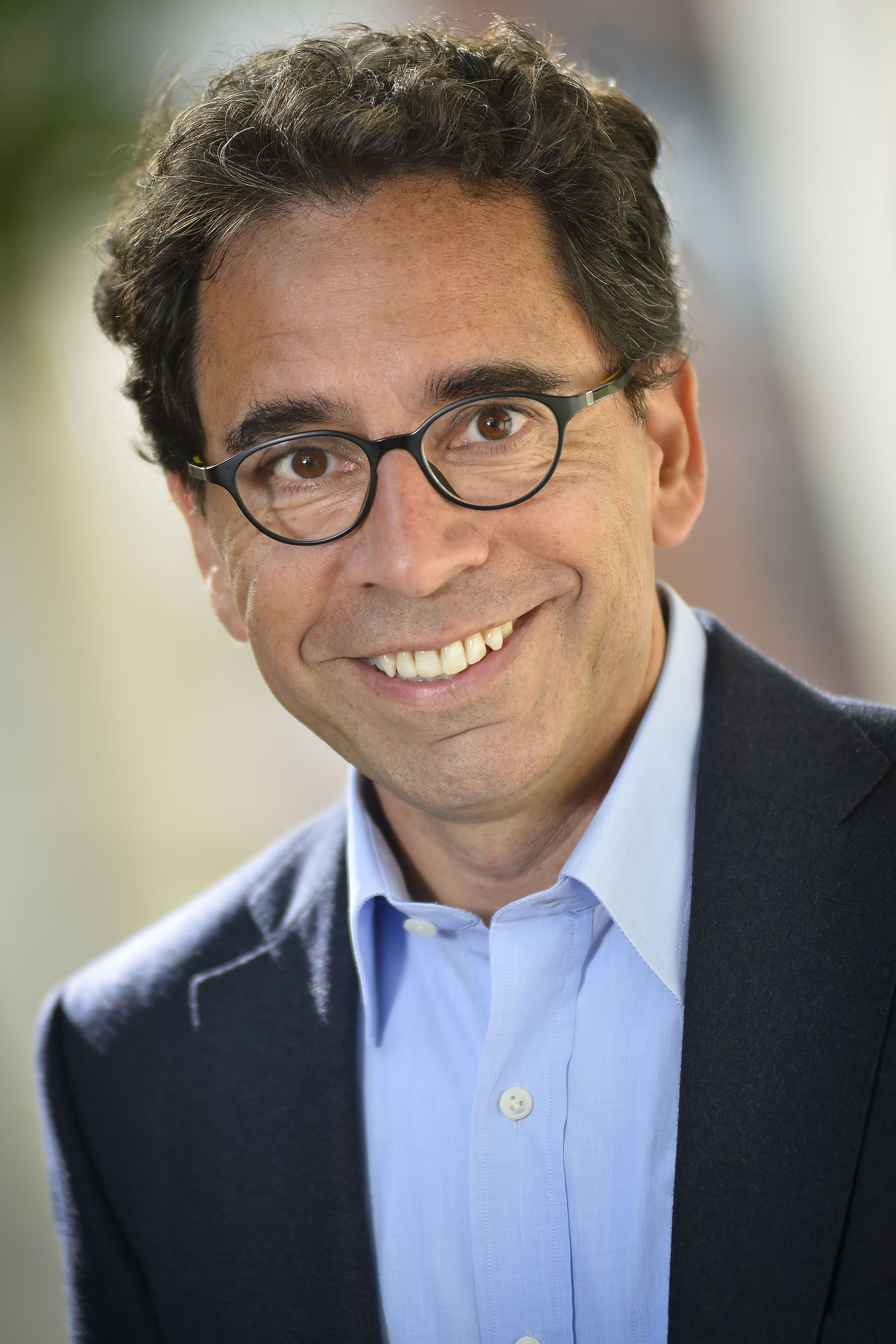
- Born: April 6, 1961 (age 65); Iserlohn
- Education: Heidelberg University
- Known for: Management consultant Author; Sinologist; Professor of International Business (China and India)
- Website: www.vermeer-consult.com

Manuel Vermeer (born 6 April 1961 in Iserlohn, Germany) is a German Sinologist, management consultant, author, and lecturer. He is the founder and owner of Dr. Vermeer-Consult, a consultancy that advises European companies conducting business in China and India.

== Biography ==
Manuel Vermeer was born in Iserlohn in 1961 first son of the Indian-born Mira Vermeer (née Sethna) and German linguist Hans Josef Vermeer.

He studied classical and modern Sinology under Günther Debon at the Institute of Chinese Studies, Heidelberg University, and also studied Romance languages with a focus on Spanish. He received his doctorate with a dissertation on the Chinese Special Economic Zone of Hainan.

Vermeer lives in Wiesloch, near Heidelberg, with his wife.

== Publications ==
- Successfully Negotiating in China: Minimize Risks, Optimize Contracts by Xiang Zhang; translated from Chinese by Manuel Vermeer. Gabler, Wiesbaden, 1997. ISBN 3-409-18927-0.
- Langenscheidt Phrasebook Chinese. Langenscheidt, Berlin, 2000. ISBN 3-468-22091-X.
- China.de. 3rd ed. Gabler, Wiesbaden, 2015. ISBN 978-3-8349-4704-8.
- Practice Manual India: How to Successfully Manage Your India Business (with Clas Neumann). 2nd ed. Gabler, Wiesbaden, 2016. ISBN 978-3-8349-4702-4.
- Death on the Taj Mahal. KBV, Hillesheim, 2018. ISBN 978-3-95441-431-4.
- Travel Know-How CultureShock China: Everyday Culture, Traditions, Rules of Conduct. Reise Know-How Verlag Peter Rump GmbH, 2018. ISBN 978-3-8317-2846-6.
- The Year of the Rooster. 2nd ed. Books on Demand, 2020. ISBN 978-3-7431-9261-4.
- Incoming Tourism China and India: Tourism Compact (with Felix M. Kempf). UVK, 2021. ISBN 978-3-7398-3087-2.
- By the Silk Thread. KBV, Hillesheim, 2022. ISBN 978-3-95441-624-0.
- With the Water Comes Death. 4th ed. KBV, Hillesheim, 2023. ISBN 978-3-95441-264-8.
