= Masaru Aoki =

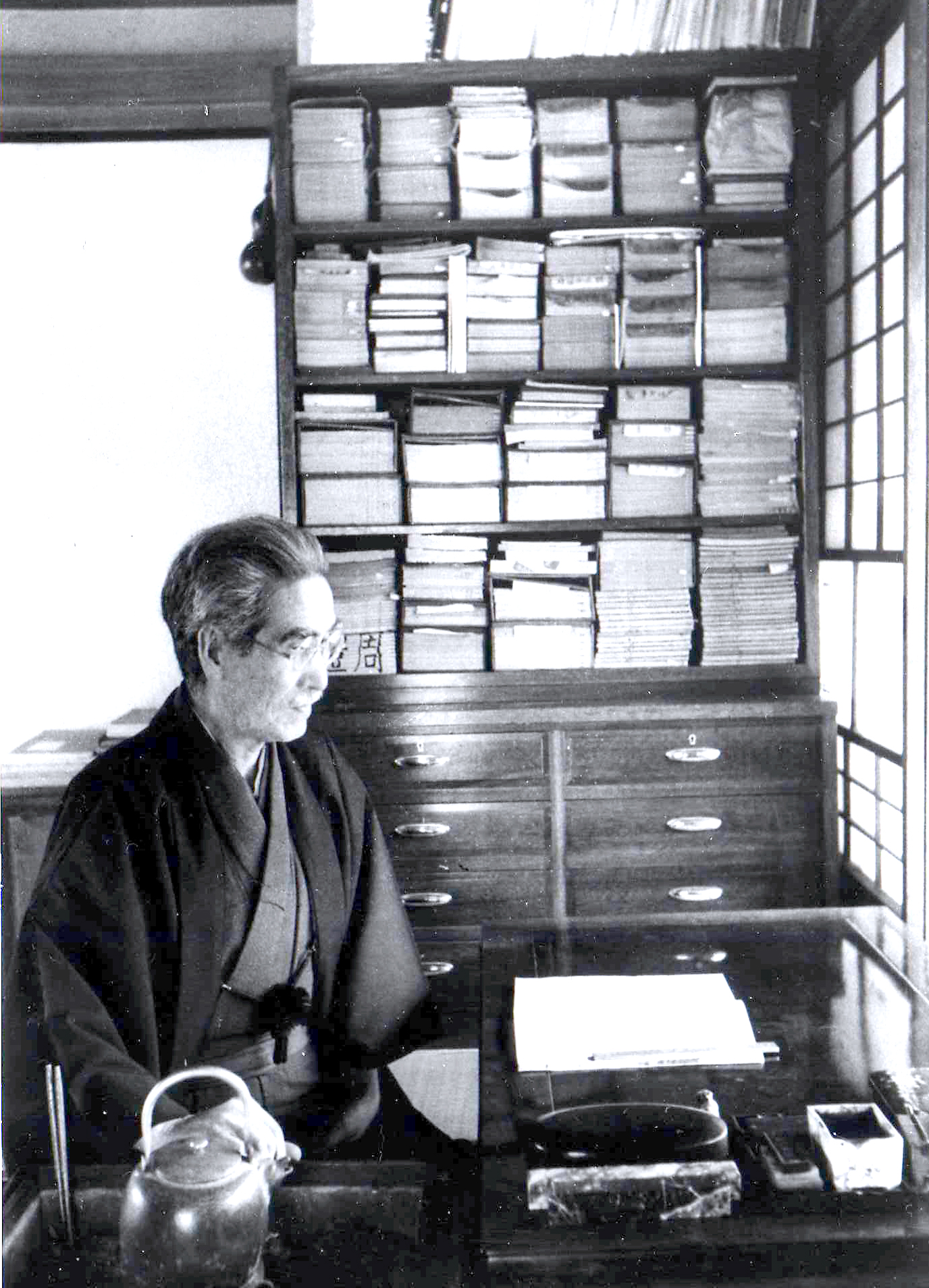
- Born: February 14, 1887; Shimonoseki, Yamaguchi, Empire of Japan
- Died: December 2, 1964 (aged 77); Kyoto, Japan
- Resting place: Kyoto
- Other name: 青木 正児
- Occupation: Sinologist
- Spouse: Tuyako Aoki
- Children: Takashi Nakamura(Sinologist)

Masaru Aoki (青木 正児, Aoki Masaru; or Seiji, 1887–1964) was a Japanese Sinologist.

== Biography ==
=== from birth to university's student ===
Masaru Aoki was born in Shimonoseki in 1887. His father, Tanpei Aoki (青木坦平), was a traditional Chinese doctor and was a local influential person. When Tanpei was young, he studied at the private school of Shozan Shiraishi. Therefore, his family had a rich Chinese cultivated atmosphere; Nanga painter stayed in Tanpei's house and his wife or girls studied Chinese musical instruments. Seiji grew up in that circumstance and was interested in drawing arts and literature.

Seiji received a secondary education in Toyoura Chugaku. After graduation in 1905, he entered the Fifth Higher School in Kumamoto. When the Chinese seminar was established at Kyoto University in 1908, he became one of the first entranced students. He was lectured from Naoki Kano(狩野直喜), Kōda Rohan, Torao Suzuki(鈴木虎雄), Naitō Konan, etc. In addition to academic studies, He received teaching as a novel writer from Kōda Rohan. But Rohan resigned from university after one year, so he stopped his creative activities.

He wrote a graduation thesis "A study of Qu-poetry" under his mentor, Naoki Kano, and graduated from Kyoto University in 1911.

=== As a sinologist after graduation ===
He became a professor at Dai Nippon Butoku Kai in September 1911. In 1918, he moved Doshisha University. He and his colleagues, Sukema Ojima and Sigeyuki Honda, started publishing the journal "Sinology" in 1920. Around the 1920s, he knew Hu Shih, Zhou Zuoren and Lu Xun, and kept in touch with thenm through letters. And he also joined the club of suibokuga "Kouhan-sya"(考槃社), and left many drawings. He was a friend of Tomioka Tessai in this field.

In 1924, he became an assistant professor at Tohoku Imperial University and his family moved from Kyoto to Sendai. For the promotive preparation to the professor, he also became as a visiting researcher to abroad, Ministry of Letters, and studied in China. He rid ship from his hometown Shimonoseki to Pusan on 26 March. He stayed in Beiping. He visited Wang Guowei in his staying. His studying abroad was finished in July 1926, and he became a professor of Tohoku Imperial University (It is the establishment of the second seminar of Chinese studies, Chinese literature.). In 1930, he got the Doctor of Letters for his dissertation "The History of Chinese Drama in Early Modern Period". In 1937, He moved to Kyoto Imperial University as a professor as the successor of Torao Suzuki. He taught there until 1947, and he brought up younger scholars, Kōjirō Yoshikawa, Takeshiro Kuraishi(倉石 武四郎) etc.

== Works ==
Aoki wrote an article named "Hu Shih and the Chinese Literary Revolution" which was published in Chinese Study (T: 支那學, S: 支那学, P: Zhīnà Xué) in 1920. During the 1930s and 1940s, Aoki's work was considered an important contribution to translating and studying Chinese literature.

Patricia Sieber wrote that "Aoki, an internationally influential Sinologist, presented his love affair with Chinese dramas as an intimate and aesthetic affair of the heart."

When I was a child, I was already extremely enamored of [Japanese] puppet theatre (jōruri). Around 1907,... I came across Sasagawa Rinpu's History of Chinese Literature [1898]. The book quoted the "Startling Dream" scene from [Jin Shengtan's version of the] Xixiang ji (Story of the Western wing) [in which Student Zhang dreams that his beloved Cui Yingying, from whom he is temporarily separated, follows him while she is simultaneously being pursued by a bandit]. I did not yet fully comprehend what I read, but I was already thoroughly entranced. Later on, when I obtained a book that contained several annotated scenes of the Xinxiang ji, I was even happier. This was not only the beginning of my knowledge of, but also of my love for Chinese drama.

Some of his books include:

- (1959) Yuan Jen Tsa Chu Hsu Shuo
- (1930) Shina kinsei gikyoku shi
- (1957) Yuan ren za ju gai shuo
- (1943) Shina bungaku shisō shi (支那文学思想史; "A History of Chinese Literary Thought"), Iwanami Shoten

The Shina bungei shichō (支那文芸論藪) by Aoki was published in the Iwanami Koza series Sekai shichō in 1928. Wang Chün-yü^{h} (C: 王俊瑜, P: Wáng Jùnyú) published a Chinese version in 1933, titled Chung-kuo ku-tai wen-i ssu-ch'ao lun (T: 中國古代文藝思潮論, S:中国古代文艺思潮论, P: Zhōngguó Gǔdài Wényì Sīcháo Lún).

== Relatives ==
- Wife: Tuyako Aoki was a cousin of Kannosuke Kito, the sixth mayor of Ube.
- Second son: Atsushi Aoki(青木) is a biologist. He was a professor at Kyoto Prefectural University.
- Fourth son: Takashi Nakamura(中村喬) is a sinologist. He was a professor at Ritumeikan University. He was adopted at a young, but he received his father's study and supported publications.
