= Corinne Debaine-Francfort =

French archaeologist and Sinologist

- Occupations: Archaeologist, sinologist
- Awards: Archaeology Prize of the Simone and Cino Del Duca Foundation

Corinne Debaine-Francfort is a French archaeologist and sinologist, a researcher at the CNRS specialised in the archaeology on Eastern Central Asia (Sinkiang or East Turkestan) and in the protohistory of north-west China.

== Career ==
Debaine-Francfort has been a Doctor of Far Eastern studies at Paris Diderot University (Paris 7) since 1989 and research director at CNRS since 1995. She is a member of a team carrying out research on Central Asia. She has taken part in various archaeological expeditions in this region, and in the first Sino-foreign excavation to be authorized by China since 1949. Since 1995 she has been co-director of the Franco-Chinese archaeological mission to Sinkiang. In 2014, she received the Grand Prize of Archaeology from the Simone and Cino Del Duca Foundation for the archaeological mission in Sinkiang.

== Awards and honours ==
- 1997: Prix Clio pour la Recherche archéologique française à l'étranger
- 2004: Prix Hirayama de l'Académie des Inscriptions et Belles-Lettres
- 2013: Prix La Recherche, mention 'Archéologie', pour le programme « Bio-archéologie » de la Mission archéologique franco-chinoise au Sinkiang
- 2014: Grand Prix d'archéologie de la Fondation Simone et Cino del Duca
- 2015: Chevalier dans l'Ordre national du Mérite

== La redécouverte de la Chine ancienne ==
La redécouverte de la Chine ancienne
- Author: Corinne Debaine-Francfort
- Original title: La redécouverte de la Chine ancienne
- Translator: Paul G. Bahn
- Language: French
- Series: Découvertes Gallimard●Archéologie
- Release number: 360
- Subject: Archaeology of China
- Genre: Nonfiction monograph
- Publisher: FR: Éditions Gallimard; US: Harry N. Abrams; UK: Thames & Hudson
- Publication date: 1998
- Publication place: France
- English publication date: 1999
- Media type: Print (Paperback)
- Pages: 160 pp.
- ISBN: 978-2-070-53352-7 (first edition)
- OCLC: 502319274
- Preceded by: Le Théâtre de Boulevard : « Ciel, mon mari ! »
- Followed by: Napoléon : « Mon ambition était grande »
- Website: www.gallimard.fr/Catalogue/GALLIMARD/Decouvertes-Gallimard/Decouvertes-Gallimard/Archeologie/La-redecouverte-de-la-Chine-ancienne

La redécouverte de la Chine ancienne (lit. 'The Rediscovery of Ancient China'; English-language edition: The Search for Ancient China) is a pocket-sized book on archaeology of China published by Éditions Gallimard in 1998 in the Archéologie series of their Découvertes collection. Debaine-Francfort starts this archaeological journey with the "Birth of Archaeology in China" (chap. I), followed by chapters devoted to the artefacts and other findings of the Neolithic Age (chap. II, "The Chinese Neolithic: From Singular to Plural"), Shang dynasty (chap. III, "The Shang: The Emergence of a Civilization"), Zhou dynasty (chap. IV, "Eight Centuries of Eventful History"), Qin dynasty (chap. V, "Qin or the First Empire") and Han dynasty (chap. VI, "The Spread of the Han Empire"). The "Documents" section at the back contains a compilation of excerpts which is divided into four parts: 1, The time of the collectors; 2, The first emperor; 3, Text and memory; 4, A conversation with K. C. Chang. In addition to the excerpts, it also features in this section a chronology, a table of historical landmarks, a list of further reading, list of illustrations and an index. The book has been translated into American and British English, Italian, Japanese, Russian, South Korean, Swedish and Turkish.

== Selected publications ==
- Du Néolithique à l'Âge du Bronze en Chine du Nord-Ouest : La culture de Qijia et ses connexions, collection « Mémoires de la Mission Archéologique Française en Asie Centrale » (nº 6). Paris: Éditions Recherche sur les Civilisations, 1995
- La redécouverte de la Chine ancienne, collection « Découvertes Gallimard » (nº 360), série Archéologie. Paris: Éditions Gallimard, 1998 (new edition in 2008)
  - UK edition – The Search for Ancient China, 'New Horizons' series. London: Thames & Hudson, 1999 (reprinted in 2010)
  - US edition – The Search for Ancient China, "Abrams Discoveries" series. New York: Harry N. Abrams, 1999
- With Abduressul Idriss, Keriya, mémoires d'un fleuve : Archéologie et civilisation des oasis du Taklamakan, Paris: Éditions Findakly, 2001

== Documentaries ==
The Mummies of Taklamakan (French: Les Momies du Taklamakan), a 2003 documentary film about the Taklamakan mummies discovered by the research campaign led by Corinne Debaine-Francfort and Abduressul Idriss. It is a part of the DVD documentary Le Mystère des momies from Arte's documentary collection The Human Adventure. The documentary is directed by Olivier Horn and available in English.

Debaine-Francfort also appears in Loulan : les princesses endormies, as commentator, a documentary directed by Serge Tignères, released in 2006.

== See also ==
- Jean-Pierre Drège
