= Kōjirō Yoshikawa =

Japanese sinologist (1904–1980)

- Yoshikawa Kōjirō 吉川幸次郎
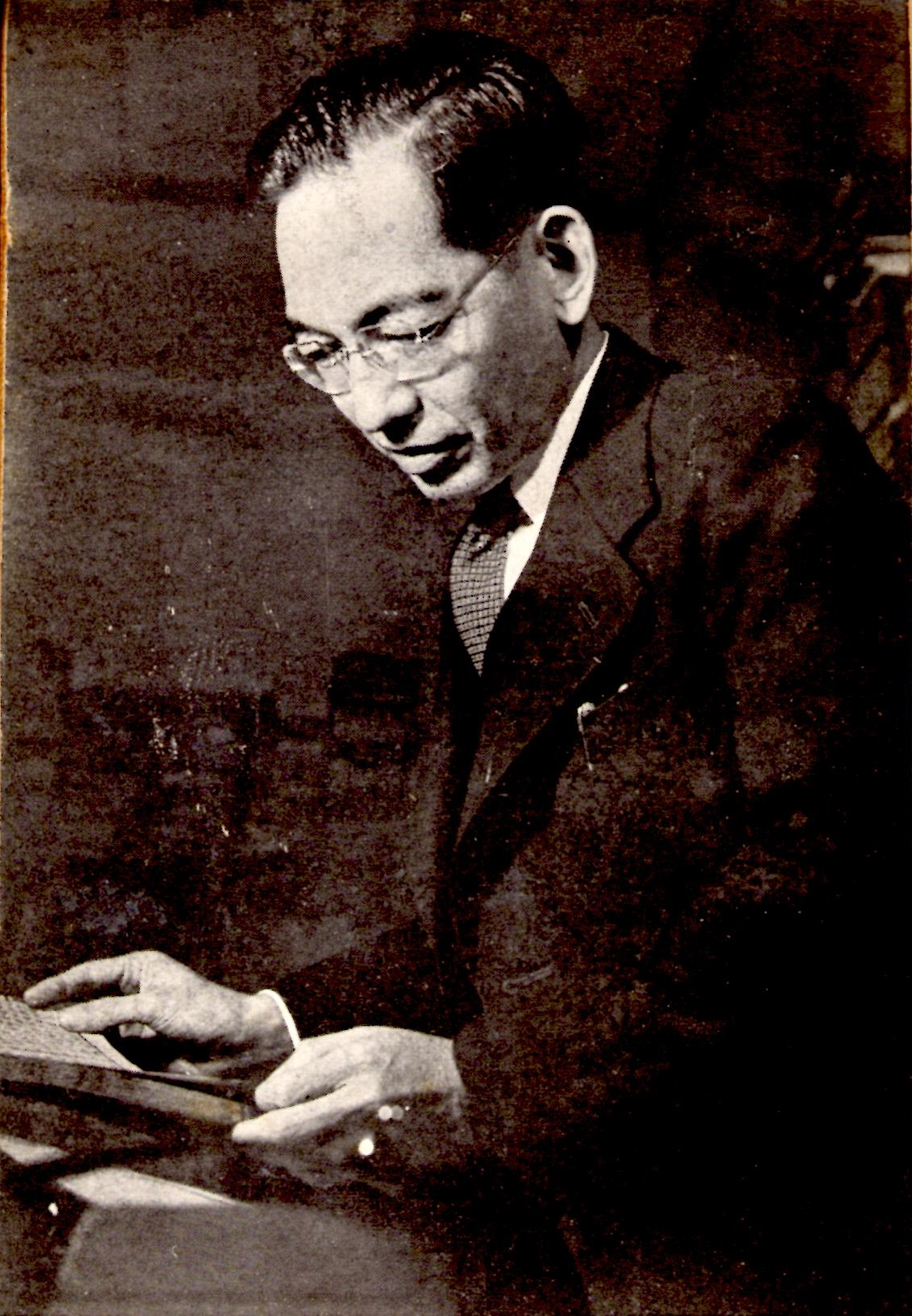
- Born: March 18, 1904; Kobe, Japan
- Died: April 8, 1980 (aged 76); Kyoto, Japan
- Education: Kyoto University
- Known for: Chinese history, Classical Chinese
- Scientific career
- Institutions: Kyoto University
- Academic advisors: Naoki Kano

Kōjirō Yoshikawa (吉川 幸次郎, Yoshikawa Kōjirō; 18 March 1904 – 8 April 1980) was a Japanese sinologist noted for his studies of Chinese history and Classical Chinese literature, especially the Book of Documents (Shujing) and Analects of Confucius.

Yoshikawa was awarded many honors for his scholarship, including membership in the Japan Art Academy and he was named a Person of Cultural Merit. In 1969 he was awarded the Prix Stanislas Julien for the entire body of his work.

== Life and career ==
Yoshikawa was born on 18 March 1904 in Kobe, Japan, as the second son of a local merchant. He entered middle school in 1916 and was introduced to the classics of Chinese history and historical fiction, such as the Records of the Grand Historian, Water Margin, Journey to the West, and Romance of the Three Kingdoms. In 1920, Yoshikawa entered the Third Advanced School in Kyoto, where he met fellow China enthusiast and future colleague Masaru Aoki and began studying Mandarin Chinese. In 1923, prior to entering university, Yoshikawa traveled to China, spending time in and around Jiangsu Province. Yoshikawa's interest in literature increased during this period as he read the works of noted Japanese authors Ryūnosuke Akutagawa and Haruo Satō.

Yoshikawa matriculated at the Department of Literature of Kyoto University in 1923, where he studied Chinese and classical Chinese literature under the guidance of scholars Naoki Kano (1868–1947) and Torao Suzuki (1878–1963). He graduated in 1926 with a thesis on rhythm and prosody in Chinese poetry. After graduating, Yoshikawa was accepted as a graduate student and began advanced study in Tang poetry. From 1928 to 1931, Yoshikawa studied in Peking (modern Beijing), where he became friends with fellow sinologist Takeshirō Kuraishi (1897–1975). Following his six years in China, Yoshikawa returned to Japan where he took up a position at what is now The Kyoto University Research Centre for the Cultural Sciences and taught courses in Kyoto University's Department of Literature.

Yoshikawa was an ardent admirer of Confucius and sought to emulate traditional Chinese Confucian scholars in his personal conduct, even adopting a Chinese courtesy name: Zenshi 善之 (Mandarin: Shànzhī). In 1932, Yoshikawa married a woman named Nobu Nakamura and bought a home in the Sakyō area of Kyoto, where he and his wife lived together their entire lives.

During the late 1930s and 1940s Yoshikawa and his colleagues worked on editing and translating an edition of the 7th century Chinese work Shangshu zhengyi 尚書正義, a commentary on the Book of Documents written by scholar Kong Yingda.

== Selected works ==
吉川幸次郎 1904-1980 WorldCat Authority page lists 521 works in 1,296 publications in 3 languages and 5,545 library holdings.

- —— (1967). An Introduction to Sung Poetry. translated by Burton Watson. Cambridge, Mass.: Harvard University Press.
- —— (1983). Jinsai, Sorai, Norinaga : Three Classical Philologists of Mid-Tokugawa Japan. Tokyo, Japan: Toho Gakkai. ISBN 4924530026.
- —— (1989). Five Hundred Years of Chinese Poetry, 1150-1650: The Chin, Yuan, and Ming Dynasties. translated by John Timothy Wixted. Princeton, N.J.: Princeton University Press. ISBN 0691067686.
- ——. 吉川幸次郎全集 (Yoshikawa KōJirō Zenshū Complete Works of Yoshikawa KōJirō). Tokyo: Chikuma Shobo. 24 volumes. 16 editions published between 1969 and 1996.

== References and further reading ==
- Diény, J-P (1981). "Yoshikawa Kōjirō (1904-1980)". T'oung Pao. 67 (1–2): 4–9. doi:10.1163/156853281X00029.
- Wixted, John Timothy, "Some Sidelights on Japanese Sinologists of the Early Twentieth Century" (PDF), Sino-Japanese Studies, 11
