= Ali bin Ghanem Al-Hajri =

Qatari academic and diplomat

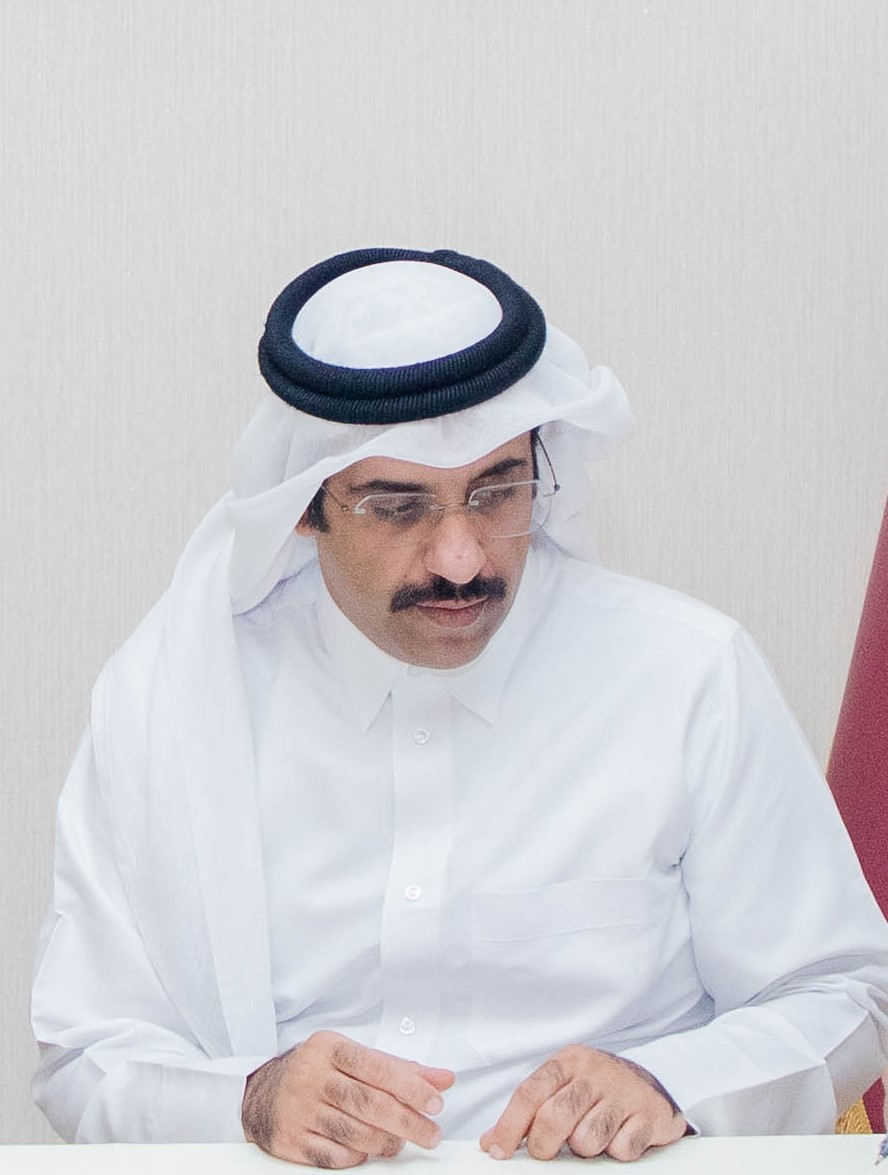
- Born: 15 April 1983 (age 43)
- Occupations: Writer, Diplomat
- Writing career
- Period: 2012- Date
- Subjects: Sinology, History, Economy
- Notable works: The Sun Fleet; Economic Papers on the Silk Road; The Chinese Emperor of Sea: Zhen He; Emperor of the East: Zhu Di; Qatar in the Eyes of Travelers and Archeologists
- Notable awards: GCC Secretary-General Award, Albabtain Global Prize for Historical and Cultural Studies in Andalusia, 2018, UNESCO honorary award, Honorary Doctorate Award, Umaru Musa Yar'adua University, 2026

Ali Bin Ghanem Al-Hajri (Arabic: علي بن غانم الهاجري) is a Qatari sinologist, writer, historian, and diplomat, who has held several positions in the Ministry of Foreign Affairs of the State of Qatar. He currently serves as the Director of African Affairs at the Qatari Ministry of Foreign Affairs after serving as Ambassador of Qatar to Nigeria, Cameroon, Gabon and São Tomé and Príncipe

He wrote extensively in the fields of history, sinology and economy, and has authored several books which include Qatar in the Eyes of Travelers and Archaeologists, The Sun Fleet, Arts in the Ming Dynasty, Zheng He: The Chinese Sea Emperor, Economic Papers on the Silk Road and many other notable publications. A lot of his writings focus on historical ties between nations.

== Education ==
Al-hajri obtained an LL. B from Jordan, and further earned an LL. M in European Commercial Law from the United Kingdom. He also obtained a Doctor of Philosophy (PhD) in Political Science on Darfur and the Globalization of Crises from the International Islamic University Malaysia, in addition to Masters of Business Administration (NBA) He was also awarded an honorary doctorate in International Relations from Umaru Musa Yar'adua University Katsina Nigeria in 2026 in recognition of his contributions to diplomacy and world peacebuilding.

== Writing career ==
Al-Hajri started writing early in his career. Depending on his early interest in cultural history of various people across the world, he wrote extensively about Chinese, Arab and African history. Some critiques considered his works on China to be unprecedented in the Arab world especially the Gulf Region. In 2018, he wrote a novel titled The Sun Fleet, based on the story of the Chinese explorer "Zheng He" and his maritime adventures. It became the first Chinese-Arab novel, after which a documentary film was produced on the history of the Arab and Chinese cultures.

=== Books and publications ===
Al-Hajri has a number of books and publications in history and economics, which have been translated into several languages such as Spanish, Chinese, Sinhala, Indonesian, Hausa, Yoruba and Igbo.^{[1][2]} They include:

1. Qatar in the eyes of travelers, (Hamad bin Khalifa University - Qatar 2018). The original work has been translated into many languages including Indonesian, Chinese, Spanish, Hausa, Igbo and Yoruba, as follows:

- The Chinese edition of the book "Qatar in the Eyes of Travelers" (published by the Flower City House of the Southern Group for Publishing in Guangzhou, 2020.)
- Kasar Katar a Idon Matafiya (the Hausa Language edition of the book published by the Ahmadu Bello University press Zaria 2022.
- Ilu Katar Loju Arinrin-ajo (The Yoruba Language edition of the book published by the University of Ilorin press, Nigeria 2022.)
- Kotor N'anya Ndi Ojemba (The Igbo Language edition of the book published by University of Nigeria Nsukka 2023.)
- The Spanish edition of the book (Qatar in the Eyes of Travelers" (published by the Andalusian Printing Press, Madrid, 2021)
- The Indonesian edition of the book (Qatar in the Eyes of Travelers" (published by Gramedia Pustaka Utama, 2020)
- The Sinhala edition of the book (Qatar in the Eyes of Travelers" (published by Manara Publishing House, Sri Lanka, 2021)
- The Nepali edition of the book (Qatar in the Eyes of Travelers" (published in collaboration with Kathmandu University, 2022)
- The Swahili edition of the book Qatar in the Eyes of Travelers University of Dar El- Salam Press, 2025
- The Amharic edition of the book "Qatar in the Eyes of Travelers" (published by Dar Al-Najashi in Addis Ababa)
- The Urdu edition of the book "Qatar in the Eyes of Travelers" was published in 2025.
- The Kanuri edition of the book "Qatar in the Eyes of Travelers" (published by University of Maiduguri Press, Republic of Nigeria 2023)
- The English edition of the book "Qatar in the Eyes of Travelers" (published in 2025 in University of Lagos).

2. Arts in the Ming Dynasty, (Islamic Museum Authority - Qatar 2018). The book sheds light on the artistic fields during the Ming dynasty. It introduces to the reader the conditions of the Ming dynasty in politics, economics, construction of defensive military projects, cultural development, and other aspects.

3. Economic Papers on the Silk Road (Chinese Publishing House, 2020): This book examines in detail the Belt and Road Initiative by dividing it into "economic papers," each of which deals with one of the dimensions of this initiative and examines this initiative from a different perspective according to each economic paper.

4. The Sun fleet (Novel) (Dar Lusail for publication and distribution). This novel deals with the travels of the famous Chinese traveller Zheng He, the founder of the Maritime Silk Road, and tells us the story of his arrival in the Arabian Peninsula at the head of a great fleet, so that Fuwairit became the focus of events, where he met with Arab leaders and trade representatives, and established relations with countries along the Silk Road. The novel was translated into several world languages such as Sinhala, Chinese, Indonesian:

- The Way of the Sun (Chinese edition of The Sun Fleet published by Beijing University in 2019)
- Awon Oko Ogun Oju Omi Lati Ila Oorun (Yoruba translation of the Novel published by the University of Ilorin Nigeria 2023)
- Armada Matahari (Indonesian edition of the novel)
- Manyan Jiragen Ruwan Mahuda Rana (Hausa translation of the Novel published by the Ahmadu Bello University, Nigeria 2023)
- The Sun Fleet, Sinhala Edition (published in cooperation with the University of Colombo)

5. Zheng He - Emperor of the Chinese Seas, (published by Hamad Bin Khalifa University Press, 2020.) This book tells about the historical event of Zheng He's seven voyages to the Western Oceans, and describes the historical figure Zheng He and his major contributions in various fields, as well as the effects resulting from his voyages.

6.The Emperor of the East: Zhu Di, (published by Dafaf Publications, 2020.) This book deals with the biography of the Chinese Emperor, the founder of the Ming Imperial Dynasty, and this book highlights to us the position of this most famous emperor in the history of China, due to his high hopes and amazing achievements, and the impenetrable barriers that were overcome in the life of this emperor. This work is considered the first book in the Arabic language that deals with this important aspect of Chinese history.

7.China in the Eyes of Travelers, (published by Hamad Bin Khalifa University Press, 2020) The book deals with part of the mosaic of Chinese history from the accounts of early Muslim travellers and geographers. It is considered a scroll of the dazzling drawing of ancient China through many diverse historical facts. The book includes five chapters in which depicts the form of society of the Tang and Song dynasties. The two empires, as well as the early Yuan Dynasty in terms of economic activities, architectural arts, painting, and social living.

8.The Chinese edition of the book "China in the Eyes of a Traveler" published by the South China State Publishing House, 2020.

9.Al-Hajeb Al-Mansur: Legend of Andalusia, (2022) The book discusses the life of the Andalusian leader Al-Hajib Al-Mansur ibn Abi Amer from the Islamic Andalusian state. Beginning with the biography and characteristics of Hajib al-Mansur, the book deals with the factors that helped him reach power, his struggle with aspiring powers, his relations with the Spanish kingdom and the Maghreb, his efforts to organize the army, and his role in cultural and architectural development during era.

10.The African Legend and Scholar: Sheikh Othman bin Fodi, (2022) The book deals with the life of the Muslim leader in West Africa, who established a strong Islamic state in this region. The book may be the first book published on the life of this personality by an Arab writer in more than half a century

11. Arab Sinology and the Study of Contemporary China (2024) The book sheds light on the efforts of the Arabs and their role in the field of Sinology, and to elaborate on the general perception of Arab Sinology. The book is considered one of the first books that talked about Arab Sinology as an independent field of study

12. Sinology: The Study of Contemporary China in Europe (2024), the book explores Sino-European relations from a sinological perspective and European scholars' contributions to the field of sinology.

13. The Founder's Biography: Sheikh Jassim bin Mohammed Al Thani (2025): This book, one of the author's latest publications, discusses the biography of Sheikh Jassim bin Mohammed Al Thani, the founder of the State of Qatar, discussing his authentic characteristics and his political, social, scientific, reformist, literary, and charitable roles.

14. The Federal Republic of Nigeria: A Journey Through History, Identity, and Culture (2025): This book presents a history of Nigeria, focusing on its diverse cultures, from the ancient Nok civilization to the horizons of modern partnership.

- English edition of The Federal Republic of Nigeria: A Journey Through History, Identity, and Culture, 2025.

15. The Rebellious Sheikh (2025): This is Al-Hajri’s latest work, in which he discusses the biography of Sheikh Issa bin Tarif Al-Binali and his political adventures in the eastern region of the Arabian Peninsula, as well as his political and social influence there.

16. Darfur and the Globalization of Crises, International Islamic University Malaysia, 2017: This is a treatise that discusses globalization in the context of Darfur crises, which is considered one of the author's earliest published books.

17. The Jabrian Sultanate: The Reign of Sultan Ajwad bin Zamil (Hamad bin Khalifa University - Qatar 2018) discusses the history of era of Jabrian Sultanate in the gulf region covering period from 820 AH / 1417 AD until 932 AH - 1525 AD.

== Diplomatic career ==
Al-Hajri began his diplomatic career in the Ministry of Foreign Affairs of the State of Qatar where he Headed the Legalization and Attestation Department, before joining the office of the Minister of Foreign Affairs. He was later assigned to the Embassies of the State of Qatar in London, the United Kingdom and Madrid in Spain. As a diplomat in Spain, Al-Hajri's cultural initiatives resulted in the establishment of the "Andalusian House of Literary and Historical Studies," which became a center that translated and printed literary and historical books and researches on Andalusian scholars such as Lisan al-Din ibn Khatib, al-Hajib al-Mansour and others. However, the activities of the activities of the House declined due to the outbreak of the COVID-19 pandemic.

He moved to the Southern part of China where he established the Qatar Consular office in Guangzhou and becoming the Consul General of Qatar in the region for several years later. As a Consul General in Guangzhou China, Al-Hajri's cultural initiatives were enormous. In addition to his researches and publications on China, Al-Hajri supervised initiatives, the most important of which were "Arabic Literature and the Silk Road" initiative. This initiative reached more than 200 Chinese universities in form of translations and researches.

Ali bin Ghanem became the Director of African Affairs at the Qatari Ministry of Foreign Affairs after serving as the Ambassador Extraordinary and Plenipotentiary of Qatar to Nigeria, Cameroun, Gabon and São Tomé and Príncipe between 2021 and 2025.

== See also ==
- Arab Sinology
