= Oliver J. Moore =

British sinologist

Oliver Moore is a British sinologist, and the first Chair in Chinese at Groningen University.

== Career ==
Moore was educated at Bryanston School, the School of Oriental and African Studies, the University of Cambridge, and Fudan University in Shanghai. He has worked at Leiden University, Kyoto University, the National Museum of Ethnology in Leiden and the British Museum in London. He has researched a variety of topics, including the social history, visual arts and material culture of China. His inaugural lecture as Professor at Groningen, on 12 December 2017, was titled "Facts, Fictions, and Attitudes: Common Tactics for Representing China".

== Selected publications ==
=== Books ===
- 2023 Photography in China: Science, Commerce and Communication (Routledge)
- 2004 Rituals of Recruitment in Tang China: Reading an Annual Programme in the Collected Statements by Wang Dingbao (870-940) (Sinica Leidensia LXV, Brill)
- 2000 Reading the Past: Chinese (British Museum Press)

=== Articles ===
- 2007 “Zou Boqi (1819-1869), Map-maker and Photographer”, for Kenneth Hammond ed., The Human Tradition in Modern China. Rowman & Littlefield
- 2006 "The Dongyang Cave, Art, Society and China", in Kitty Zijlmans, ed., Site-Seeing: Places in Culture, Time and Space. Leiden: CNWS Publications, 2006: 53-87
- 2003 "Violence Un-scrolled: Cultic and Ritual Emphases in Painting Guan Yu”, Arts Asiatiques 58 (2003): 86-97
- 2000 "China's Art and Material Culture", in Chinese Studies in the Netherlands
- 1995 "Arms and armour in late Imperial China: pieces AD 1600-199 in the British Museum", in Apollo, the International Magazine of Arts
