= Beilu Yiyu =

Mongol-Chinese dictionary

The Beilu Yiyu (Chinese: 北虜譯語) also known as Yiyu is a Ming-era Mongol-Chinese dictionary.
