= Snejina Gogova =

Linguistics researcher

Snejina Gogova (Bulgarian: Снежина Гогова) (born November 13, 1937; died December 4, 2025) was a Bulgarian Sinologist, sociolinguist, and psycholinguist, and Professor Emeritus of Chinese Linguistics at the Faculty of Classical and Modern Philologies of Sofia University. Gogova published in English and Chinese between 1985 and 2001 and in Russian and Bulgarian from 1970 to 2009.
