= Bernhard Fuehrer =

Bernhard Fuehrer (Chinese name: Chinese: 傅熊; pinyin: Fù Xióng, born 1960) is a Professor of Sinology at the School of Oriental and African Studies (SOAS). As well as teaching classes on Classical Chinese, he has co-authored a series of textbooks on Southern Hokkien (Taiwanese Hokkien) with Yang Hsiu-fang. In 1999, SOAS became the first institution in the United Kingdom to teach a course in Hokkien. Professor Fuehrer has advocated that the study of Taiwan should include the study of Hokkien, as without it the student would be "lacking an important aspect of this field".

He has published numerous scholarly articles, many of which focus on pre-Qin texts such as The Analects. Fittingly, his inaugural lecture at SOAS was entitled "The Beard of the Master and Other Suppositions", which examined the transmission of images and perceptions of Confucius throughout history. He is also the convener of the Early China Seminar, as well as a series of lectures named in honour of his predecessor at SOAS — the sinologist A. C. Graham — that has featured talks from academics such as Christoph Harbsmeier and Liu Xiaogan. Along with his English language publications, he has published books in German on the Chinese scholar Zhong Rong (alternatively pronounced "Hong"), who lived during Northern and Southern Dynasties, and on the history of Chinese studies in his native Austria.

== Bibliography ==
- Chinas erste Poetik: Das Shipin (Kriterion Poietikon) des Zhong Hong (467?-518). Dortmund: Projekt Verlag. 1995.
- Vergessen und verloren: Die Geschichte der österreichischen Chinastudien. Bochum: Projekt Verlag. 2001.
- 2007王夢鷗教授學術講座演講集. Taipei: National Cheng-chi University. 2008
- Southern Hokkien: An Introduction. (Three volumes) Taipei: National Taiwan University Press. 2014.
