= Henning Klöter =

- Born: 1969 (age 56–57)
- Other names: 韓可龍 , 韩可龙
- Education: University of Trier (B.A.), Leiden University (M.A. and Ph.D.)
- Known for: Taiwanese languages, Language policy in Greater China
- Awards: Co-laureate of the first Duques de Soria Foundation Prize for International Hispanism, Shortlist Excellent Teaching Award by Humboldt-University of Berlin
- Scientific career
- Workplaces: Ruhr University Bochum, Leiden University, National Taiwan Normal University, University of Mainz, University of Göttingen, Humboldt University of Berlin
- Thesis: Written Taiwanese. (2003)

Henning Klöter (born 1969 in Münster, simplified Chinese: 韩可龙; traditional Chinese: 韓可龍; pinyin: Hàn Kělóng) is a German sinologist and linguist. Since 2015, is professor of modern Chinese languages and literature at Humboldt University of Berlin.

== Life and career ==
Klöter studied Chinese Studies, German Studies and Linguistics at the University of Trier, Capital Normal University, Leiden University and National Taiwan University from 1990 to 1997. He graduated with a Master of Arts in Chinese Studies. He then worked for two years as a translator and editor at the Taiwanese international broadcaster Central Broadcasting System. This was followed by doctoral studies in Chinese linguistics at the Research School of Asian, African and Amerindian Studies (CNWS) at Leiden University, which he completed in 2003 with a dissertation on the Taiwanese written language. A revised version was published as Written Taiwanese.

Klöter then taught as a lecturer at the Faculty of East Asian Studies at Ruhr University Bochum until 2005, before returning to Leiden University's Institute of Chinese Studies as a research assistant in an NWO programme. From 2007 to 2009, he was an assistant professor at the Graduate Institute of International Sinology Studies at the National Taiwan Normal University in Taipei. From 2009 to 2012, he held a chair in Chinese languages and literature at Ruhr University Bochum. There, he obtained his habilitation in 2010 with a thesis on the language of Sangleys (i.e. overseas Chinese in the Philippines or Chinese-Filipino mixed-race people), which is documented in missionary sources from the 17th century.

Klöter was appointed professor of Chinese (translation, linguistics and cultural studies) at University of Mainz in 2012 and moved to University of Göttingen the following year as professor of Chinese as a foreign language and director of the Department of East Asian Studies. Since 2015, he has held the professorship for Modern Chinese Languages and Literatures at the Department of East Asian Studies at Humboldt University of Berlin. From 2018 to 2023, he was also managing director of the Institute for Asian and African Studies there.

His research interests include multilingualism, multiscriptism, language planning and language contact in Greater China; Chinese-language literature; historical sociolinguistics; missionary and colonial linguistics; the history of Chinese linguistics in Europe; Chinese lexicography; Chinese as a foreign language; and the history and society of Taiwan. Klöter is co-editor of the SinoLinguistica series, the CHUN – Chinesischunterricht journal, and a member of the editorial board of the International Journal of Taiwan Studies. He is also chief editor of the Journal of Asian Pacific Communication. He has appeared in several German and international media outlets as an expert on the Taiwan conflict, including Tagesschau, VOX News, and ORF III Aktuell.

== Publications (selection) ==
- (2021) (editor, with Mårten Söderblom Saarela) Language Diversity in the Sinophone World: Historical Trajectories, Language Planning, and Multilingual Practices. Abingdon, New York: Routledge.
- (2021) (editor, with Xuetao Li) Von Lindenblättern und verderbten Dialekten: Neue Studien zu Georg von der Gabelentz (1840–1893). Veröffentlichungen des Ostasien-Instituts der Ruhr-Universität Bochum 70. Wiesbaden: Harrassowitz.
- (2012) (editor, with Bi-yu Chang) Imaging and Imagining Taiwan: Identity representation and cultural politics. Wiesbaden: Harrassowitz.
- (2011) The language of the Sangleys: A Chinese vernacular in missionary sources of the seventeenth century. Leiden, Boston: Brill.
- (2006) (editor, with Dafydd Fell and Bi-yu Chang) What has changed? Taiwan before and after the change in ruling parties. Wiesbaden: Harrassowitz.
- (2005) Written Taiwanese. Wiesbaden: Harrassowitz. (PhD thesis, Leiden University, 2003).
- (2022) (with Julia Wasserfall) “Language and Society in Taiwan,” topical section of the International Journal of Taiwan Studies 5(2).
- (2022) “Language visibility and invisible languages: The street name signs of Taipei City”, International Journal of Taiwan Studies 5(2), 332–352.
- (2021) “One legacy, two legislations: Language policies on the two sides of the Taiwan Strait.” In Klöter, Henning and Mårten Söberblom Saarela (eds.), Language Diversity in the Sinophone World: Historical Trajectories, Language Planning, and Multilingual Practices. Abingdon, New York: Routledge, 101–121.
- (2021) (with Mårten Söderblom Saarela) “Introduction: Language Diversity in the Sinophone World.” In Klöter, Henning and Mårten Söberblom Saarela (eds.), Language Diversity in the Sinophone World: Historical Trajectories, Language Planning, and Multilingual Practices. Abingdon, New York: Routledge, 1–10.
- (2019) “Writing Taiwanese: Then and now, how, why and who?” In Fell, Dafydd and Hsin-Huang Michael Hsiao (eds.), Taiwan Studies Revisited. London: Routledge, 197–214.
- (2017) “China mission and linguistics: Early contributions by Catholic missionaries.” In Davor Antonucci & Pieter Ackerman (eds.), Chinese Missionary Linguistics. Leuven: Ferdinand Verbiest Institute, 73–92.
