= Yingjie Guo (academic) =

Professor of Chinese studies in Australia

- Born: 22 November 1957 (age 68)
- Board member of: Chair of Chinese Studies Department

Academic background
- Education: Shanghai International Studies University (BA/MA); University of Tasmania (PhD)
- Alma mater: University of Tasmania
- Thesis: The Politics of National Identity in Post-Tiananmen China: Cultural Nationalism v. State Nationalism (2001)

Academic work
- Discipline: Chinese Studies
- Institutions: University of Technology, Sydney

Yingjie Guo (born 1957) is an academic in Australia. He is a professor of Chinese Studies at the University of Sydney, and former chair of its Chinese Studies department. He has studied nationalism, class, and inequality in China. He has BA and MA degrees from Shanghai International Studies University, and a doctorate from the University of Tasmania. He was elected a Fellow of the Australian Academy of the Humanities in 2017.

== Publications ==
As co-author with W. Sun:

- Unequal China: The Political Economy and Cultural Politics of Inequality. London and New York: Routledge, 2013.

As editor:

- Handbook on Class and Social Stratification in China. Cheltenham: Edward Elgar Publishing, 2016.

== Weblinks ==
Yingjie Guo publications indexed by Google Scholar
