= Michel Soymié =

French scholar and author

Michel Soymié (29 July 1924 – 14 July 2002; Chinese name: 蘇遠鳴; pinyin: Sū Yuǎnmíng; Wade–Giles: Su Yüen-ming) was a French scholar and author working in the field of Chinese popular religion and literature. As a professor at the École Pratique des Hautes Études (EPHE) in Paris he directed a research group working on the Dunhuang manuscripts collected in China by the Paul Pelliot expedition of 1906-1908 which eventually evolved into the Centre de recherche Civilisation chinoise (Centre for Research on Chinese Civilisation). He was responsible for publishing the collaborative catalogue of the Pelliot Dunhuang manuscripts.

== Biography ==
Michel Soymié studied Chinese (graduating in 1947) and then Japanese (1952) at Institut National des Langues et Civilisations Orientales (INALCO), the National Institute of Oriental Languages and Civilizations in Paris. He worked at Centre national de la recherche scientifique (CNRS), the National Centre for Scientific Research (the largest public research organisation in France), first as a trainee researcher (1951-1952) and then as an assistant researcher (1953-1956).

In 1957 he moved to Japan to work at the Maison Franco-Japonaise in Tokyo until 1960 and then at the École française d'Extrême-Orient (EFEO) (French School of Far Eastern Studies) in Kyoto and Tokyo until 1966.

He was appointed to the Chair of "History and Philosophy of Mediaeval China" at the École Pratique des Hautes Études (EPHE), where he directed the Joint EPHE-CNRS Research Group working on the Dunhuang manuscripts from 1973 to 1985. His most important work was the completion and publication of the catalogue of the explorer Paul Pelliot's collection of Dunhuang manuscripts at the Bibliothèque nationale de France (French National Library). The Group also prepared descriptive notes to accompany the Pelliot collection of Chinese pictures at the Musée Guimet in Paris.

Michel Soymié also curated the collections of the Société Asiatique (French Asiatic Society), expanded various collections (notably the Japanese collection) of the EFEO Library and established the Dunhuang Manuscripts Research Group's library, described as the richest collection in its field in Europe.

He retired in 1992.

After his death his personal library was entrusted to the Bibliothèque municipale de Lyon (Municipal Library of the City of Lyon). The Library's Michel Soymié Collection of 8000 volumes includes monographs and serial publications in Western languages, Chinese and Japanese.

== Bibliography ==
- (dir.), Catalogue des manuscrits chinois de Touen-houang, fonds Pelliot de la Bibliothèque nationale, vol. 3, Paris, Fondation Singer-Polignac, 1983; vols. 4 and 5, Paris, EFEO, 1991 and 1995.
- Quelques représentations de statues miraculeuses dans les grottes de Touen-houang, in M. Soymié (dir.), Contributions aux études de Touen-houang, 3, Paris, EFEO, 1984, p. 77-102.
- Un Calendrier de douze jours par an dans les manuscrits de Touen-houang, BEFEO, vol. 69, 1981, p. 209-229.
- Un Recueil d'inscriptions sur peintures : le manuscrit P. 3304 verso, in M. Soymié (dir.), Nouvelles contributions aux études sur Touen-houang, Geneva, Droz, 1981, p. 169-204.
