= List of Guggenheim Fellowships awarded in 2016 =

List of Guggenheim Fellowships awarded in 2016: Guggenheim Fellowships have been awarded annually since 1925, by the John Simon Guggenheim Memorial Foundation to those "who have demonstrated exceptional capacity for productive scholarship or exceptional creative ability in the arts."

Category	Field of Study	Fellow	Ref
Creative Arts	Biography	Craig Seligman	
Creative Arts	Choreography	Camille A. Brown	
Creative Arts	Choreography	Michelle Ellsworth	
Creative Arts	Choreography	Emily Johnson	
Creative Arts	Choreography	Juliana F. May	
Creative Arts	Choreography	Raphael Xavier	
Creative Arts	Drama and Performance Art	Taylor Mac	
Creative Arts	Drama and Performance Art	Christina Masciotti	
Creative Arts	Drama and Performance Art	Muriel Miguel	
Creative Arts	Drama and Performance Art	Betty Shamieh	
Creative Arts	Drama and Performance Art	Kate Valk	
Creative Arts	Fiction	Jesse Ball	
Creative Arts	Fiction	Jennifer Clement	
Creative Arts	Fiction	Amity Gaige	
Creative Arts	Fiction	Laila Lalami	
Creative Arts	Fiction	Jenny Offill	
Creative Arts	Fiction	René Steinke	
Creative Arts	Fiction	Melanie Rae Thon	
Creative Arts	Fiction	Jess Row	
Creative Arts	Film - Video	Deanna Bowen	
Creative Arts	Film - Video	Robert Boyd	
Creative Arts	Film - Video	Joe Brewster	
Creative Arts	Film - Video	Jonas Carpignano	
Creative Arts	Film - Video	Ramona Diaz	
Creative Arts	Film - Video	blair dorosh-walther	
Creative Arts	Film - Video	Cheryl Dunye	
Creative Arts	Film - Video	Dee Hibbert-Jones	
Creative Arts	Film - Video	Kahlil Joseph	
Creative Arts	Film - Video	Manfred Kirchheimer	
Creative Arts	Film - Video	Carlos Javier Ortiz	
Creative Arts	Film - Video	Michèle Stephenson	
Creative Arts	Film - Video	Nomi Talisman	
Creative Arts	Film - Video	Wu Tsang	
Creative Arts	Film - Video	Jeremy Xido	
Creative Arts	Fine Arts	Marina Adams	
Creative Arts	Fine Arts	Judith Bernstein	
Creative Arts	Fine Arts	JoAnne Carson	
Creative Arts	Fine Arts	Charles Sidney Clough	
Creative Arts	Fine Arts	Colette Justine	
Creative Arts	Fine Arts	Sue de Beer	
Creative Arts	Fine Arts	Angela Dufresne	
Creative Arts	Fine Arts	Laurie Fendrich	
Creative Arts	Fine Arts	Bruce M. Gagnier	
Creative Arts	Fine Arts	Ellen Harvey	
Creative Arts	Fine Arts	George Legrady	
Creative Arts	Fine Arts	Simone Leigh	
Creative Arts	Fine Arts	Chico MacMurtrie	
Creative Arts	Fine Arts	Helen O'Toole	
Creative Arts	Fine Arts	Bruce Porter	
Creative Arts	Fine Arts	John Douglas Powers	
Creative Arts	Fine Arts	J. Morgan Puett	
Creative Arts	Fine Arts	Michelle Segre	
Creative Arts	Fine Arts	Coleen Sterritt	
Creative Arts	Fine Arts	Patrick Webb	
Creative Arts	Fine Arts	Allan Wexler	
Creative Arts	Fine Arts	Liz Young	
Creative Arts	Fine Arts	Andrea Zittel	
Creative Arts	General Nonfiction	Adam Kirsch	
Creative Arts	General Nonfiction	Chris Kraus	
Creative Arts	General Nonfiction	Amitava Kumar	
Creative Arts	General Nonfiction	Glenn Kurtz	
Creative Arts	General Nonfiction	Nick Laird	
Creative Arts	General Nonfiction	Paul Lisicky	
Creative Arts	General Nonfiction	Amanda Petrusich	
Creative Arts	General Nonfiction	Robert Storr	
Creative Arts	General Nonfiction	Sarah Payne Stuart	
Creative Arts	Music Composition	Jonathan Berger	
Creative Arts	Music Composition	Edmund Campion	
Creative Arts	Music Composition	Anthony Cheung	
Creative Arts	Music Composition	Neil Feather	
Creative Arts	Music Composition	David Fulmer	
Creative Arts	Music Composition	Bryan Jacobs	
Creative Arts	Music Composition	Andrew Norman	
Creative Arts	Music Composition	Adam Roberts	
Creative Arts	Music Composition	Laurie San Martin	
Creative Arts	Music Composition	Juri Seo	
Creative Arts	Music Composition	Wayne Shorter	
Creative Arts	Music Composition	Dalit Warshaw	
Creative Arts	Photography	Dru Donovan	
Creative Arts	Photography	Hasan M. Elahi	
Creative Arts	Photography	McNair Evans	
Creative Arts	Photography	Lyle Ashton Harris	
Creative Arts	Photography	Matthew Jensen	
Creative Arts	Photography	Alex Majoli	
Creative Arts	Photography	Eileen Neff	
Creative Arts	Photography	Louie Palu	
Creative Arts	Photography	Robin Schwartz	
Creative Arts	Photography	Yvonne Venegas	
Creative Arts	Poetry	Beth Bachmann	
Creative Arts	Poetry	Rick Barot	
Creative Arts	Poetry	Jericho Brown	
Creative Arts	Poetry	Stephanie Burt	
Creative Arts	Poetry	Cynthia Huntington	
Creative Arts	Poetry	Sally Keith	
Creative Arts	Poetry	James Kimbrell	
Creative Arts	Poetry	Deborah Landau	
Creative Arts	Poetry	Ed Roberson	
Creative Arts	Poetry	Brian Turner	
Creative Arts	Poetry	Lida Suchy	
Humanities	African Studies	Derek R. Peterson	
Humanities	American Literature	Nick Bromell	
Humanities	American Literature	Carla L. Peterson	
Humanities	Architecture, Planning and Design	Stella Nair	
Humanities	Classics	Ralph W. Mathisen	
Humanities	East Asian Studies	H. Mack Horton	
Humanities	East Asian Studies	Jing Tsu	
Humanities	English Literature	Stephen M. Fallon	
Humanities	English Literature	Pamela K. Gilbert	
Humanities	English Literature	Robert Spoo	
Humanities	European and Latin American History	Nadja Durbach	
Humanities	European and Latin American History	Marcy Norton	
Humanities	European and Latin American History	Heidi Tinsman	
Humanities	European and Latin American Literature	Janet L. Beizer	
Humanities	Film, Video and Radio Studies	Wendy Hui Kyong Chun	
Humanities	Fine Arts Research	Julia F. Andrews	
Humanities	Fine Arts Research	Jerrilynn D. Dodds	
Humanities	Folklore and Popular Culture	Daniel Sheehy	
Humanities	Intellectual and Cultural History	Craig Koslofsky	
Humanities	Intellectual and Cultural History	Valerie Traub	
Humanities	Intellectual and Cultural History	Darrin McMahon	
Humanities	Linguistics	Dennis Baron	
Humanities	Linguistics	Jonathan David Bobaljik	
Humanities	Literary Criticism	Lauren Berlant	
Humanities	Literary Criticism	Victoria Nelson	
Humanities	Literary Criticism	Robert F. Reid-Pharr	
Humanities	Literary Criticism	Naomi Seidman	
Humanities	Literary Criticism	Fred Moten	
Humanities	Medieval and Renaissance History	Mitchell B. Merback	
Humanities	Medieval and Renaissance History	Zrinka Stahuljak	
Humanities	Music Research	Timothy Rommen	
Humanities	Music Research	Ge Wang	
Humanities	Near East Studies	Aaron D. Rubin	
Humanities	Near East Studies	Theo van den Hout	
Humanities	Philosophy	Victor Caston	
Humanities	Philosophy	Anjan Chakravartty	
Humanities	Philosophy	Daniel Garber	
Humanities	Philosophy	Richard Kraut	
Humanities	Religion	Zsuzsanna Gulácsi	
Humanities	Religion	Columba Stewart	
Humanities	Religion	Leonard van der Kuijp	
Humanities	United States History	Catherine Clinton	
Humanities	United States History	Eliga H. Gould	
Humanities	United States History	Matthew Avery Sutton	
Humanities	United States History	William G. Thomas III	
Humanities	South Asian Studies	Cynthia D. Packert	
Humanities	Theatre Arts	Anna Deavere Smith	
Natural Sciences	Applied Mathematics	Charles R. Doering	
Natural Sciences	Applied Mathematics	Mark Newman	
Natural Sciences	Astronomy and Astrophysics	Feryal Özel	
Natural Sciences	Chemistry	Neil K. Garg	
Natural Sciences	Chemistry	Joseph Subotnik	
Natural Sciences	Earth Science	Alberto E. Saal	
Natural Sciences	Mathematics	Daniel T. Wise	
Natural Sciences	Molecular and Cellular Biology	Chris Fromme	
Natural Sciences	Neuroscience	Rajesh P. N. Rao	
Natural Sciences	Organismic Biology and Ecology	Gonzalo Giribet	
Natural Sciences	Organismic Biology and Ecology	David N. Reznick	
Natural Sciences	Physics	Karin A. Dahmen	
Natural Sciences	Science Writing	Rebecca Jordan-Young	
Natural Sciences	Science Writing	Katrina Karkazis	
Natural Sciences	Science Writing	Thomas Levenson	
Natural Sciences	Science Writing	Thomas McNamee	
Social Sciences	Anthropology and Cultural Studies	Susan Greenhalgh	
Social Sciences	Anthropology and Cultural Studies	Justin B. Richland	
Social Sciences	Anthropology and Cultural Studies	Glenn Davis Stone	
Social Sciences	Anthropology and Cultural Studies	Rebecca Stumpf	
Social Sciences	Constitutional Studies	David M. Rabban	
Social Sciences	Economics	Dean Karlan	
Social Sciences	Geography and Environmental Studies	Mei-Po Kwan	
Social Sciences	Geography and Environmental Studies	Katharyne Mitchell	
Social Sciences	Geography and Environmental Studies	Laura Pulido	
Social Sciences	Law	Andrea G. McDowell	
Social Sciences	Law	Alexandra Natapoff	
Social Sciences	Political Science	Adam Berinsky	
Social Sciences	Political Science	Roxanne Leslie Euben	
Social Sciences	Political Science	Diana C. Mutz	
Social Sciences	Sociology	Peter Bearman	
Social Sciences	Sociology	Kathleen Gerson	

== See also ==
- Guggenheim Fellowship
- List of Guggenheim Fellowships awarded in 2015
- List of Guggenheim Fellowships awarded in 2017
