= Romano-British culture =

Pre-Saxon England

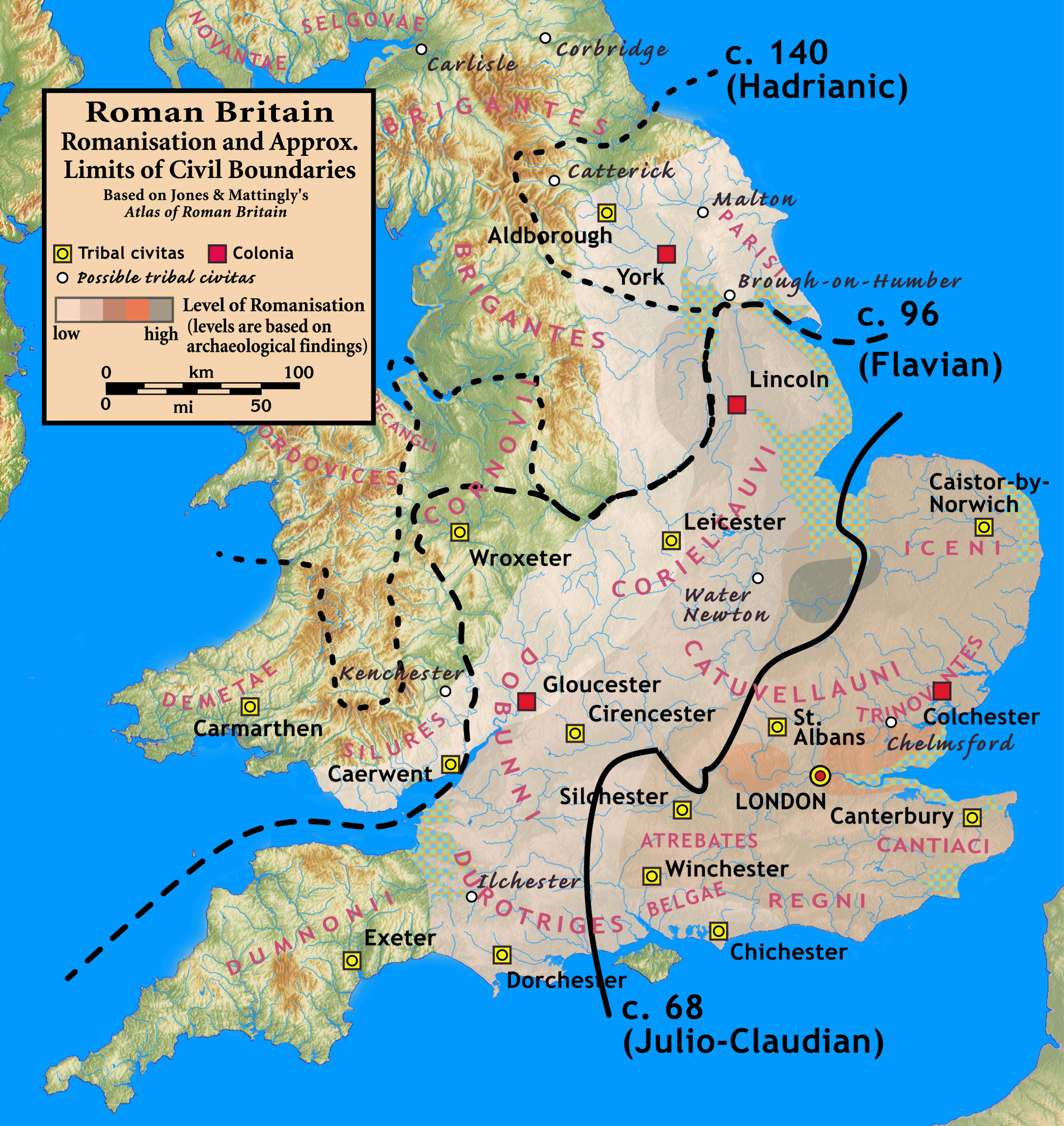
Relative degrees of Romanisation, based on archaeology. Romanisation was greatest in the southeast, extending west and north in lesser degrees. West of a line from the Humber to the Severn, and including Cornwall and Devon, Roman acculturation was minimal or non-existent.

The Romano-British culture arose in Britain under the Roman Empire following the Roman conquest in AD 43 and the creation of the province of Britannia. It arose as a fusion of the imported Roman culture with that of the indigenous Britons, a people of Celtic language and custom.

Scholars such as Christopher Snyder believe that during the 5th and 6th centuries – approximately from 410 when the Roman legions withdrew, to 597 when St Augustine of Canterbury arrived – southern Britain preserved an active sub-Roman culture that survived the attacks from the Anglo-Saxons and even used a vernacular Latin when writing.

== Arrival of the Romans ==
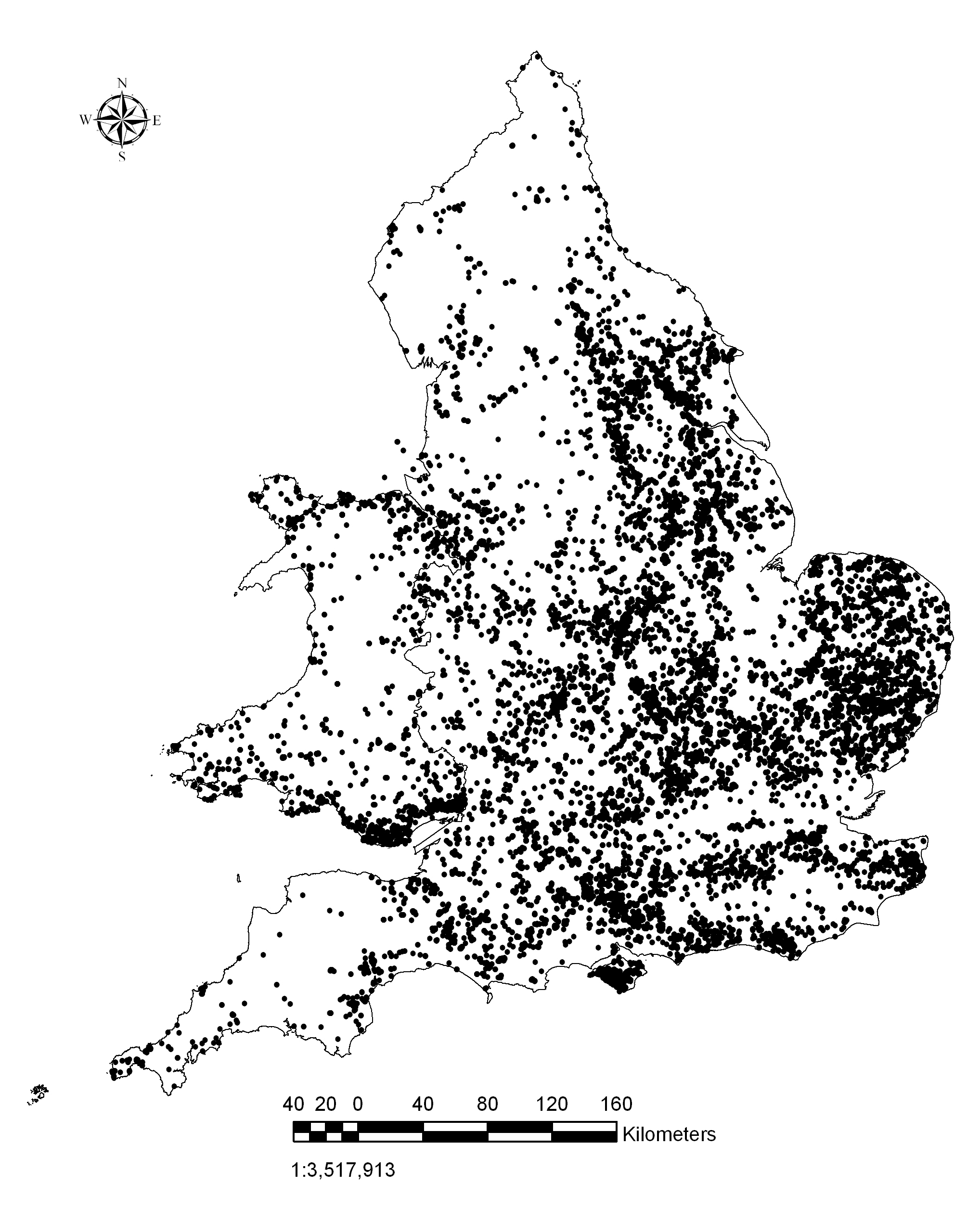
Roman coins findings clearly indicate the areas of biggest cultural Romanisation and presence in Roman Britain.

Roman troops, mainly from nearby provinces, invaded in AD 43, in what is now part of England, during the reign of Emperor Claudius. Over the next few years the province of Britannia was formed, eventually including the whole of what later became England and Wales and parts of Scotland. The Claudian army took over Colchester and eleven tribal kings of Britain also surrendered to the Roman army. By AD 47, the Romans had invaded southern Britain and claimed territory that held many natural resources. This led to an increase in imperial wealth. The Romans developed the city of Colchester through urbanisation and new clusters of public buildings. The Roman army and their families and dependents amounted to 125,000 people, out of Britannia's total population of 3.6 million at the end of the fourth century. There were also many migrants of other professions, such as sculptors (Barates) from Roman Syria and doctors from the Eastern Mediterranean region. Romano-British cultures and religions continued to diversify; while the populace remained mainly Celtic, there was an increase in Romanisation.

The bulk of the population was rural and engaged in agriculture; from a total population of 3.6 million at the end of the fourth century, the urban population was about 240,000 people, with the capital city of Londinium having about 60,000 people. Londinium was an ethnically diverse city with inhabitants from across the Roman Empire, including natives of Britannia, and immigrants from continental Europe, the Middle East, and North Africa. There was also cultural diversity in other Roman-British towns, which were sustained by considerable migration, both within Britannia and from other Roman territories, including North Africa, Syria, the Eastern Mediterranean, and continental Europe.

Christianity came to Britain in the 3rd century. One early figure was Saint Alban, who (according to tradition) was martyred near the Roman town of Verulamium, on the site of the modern St Albans, during the reign of Emperor Decius.

=== Roman citizenship ===
One aspect of Roman influence seen in British life was the grant of Roman citizenship. At first this was granted very selectively: to the council members of certain classes of towns, whom Roman practice made citizens; to veterans, either legionaries or soldiers in auxiliary units; and to a number of natives whose patrons obtained citizenship for them. The granting of Roman citizenship was gradually expanded and more people from provinces became citizens. One way for a provincial inhabitant to become a citizen was to serve in the Roman army or a city council. The number of citizens steadily increased, as people inherited citizenship and more grants were made by the emperors. Eventually in 212 or early 213 AD, everybody living in the provinces except slaves and freed slaves were granted citizenship by the Constitutio Antoniniana. Roman citizenship held many benefits; for example, citizens could make their own decisions, could request protection, and could share possessions/responsibilities within the community under the protection of Roman law.

The other inhabitants of Britain, who did not enjoy citizenship, the Peregrini, continued to live under the laws of their ancestors. Principal handicaps were that they could not own land with a Latin title, serve as a legionary in the army, or, in general, inherit from a Roman citizen. In the Republic, foreign peregrini were further named as peregrini dediticii which meant they were "surrendered foreigners" and forbidden to gain Roman citizenship. These surrendered foreigners were not provided with any of the benefits, duties, status or sense of identity of citizens. Romans continued to stigmatize peregrini dediticii as freedmen or foreigners who were tortured and excluded from citizenship forever.

== Roman departure from Britain ==
Eventually Emperor Honorius ordered Roman troops back home to help defend Italy against invasion. Constantine III initially rebelled against Honorius and took further troops to Gaul, but was later recognised as a joint emperor.

After the Roman departure from Britain, the Romano-British were advised by Honorius to "look to their own defences". A written plea with General Flavius Aetius as one of its believed recipients, known as the Groans of the Britons, may have brought some brief naval assistance from the fading Western Roman Empire, but otherwise they were on their own.

== Post-Roman period ==
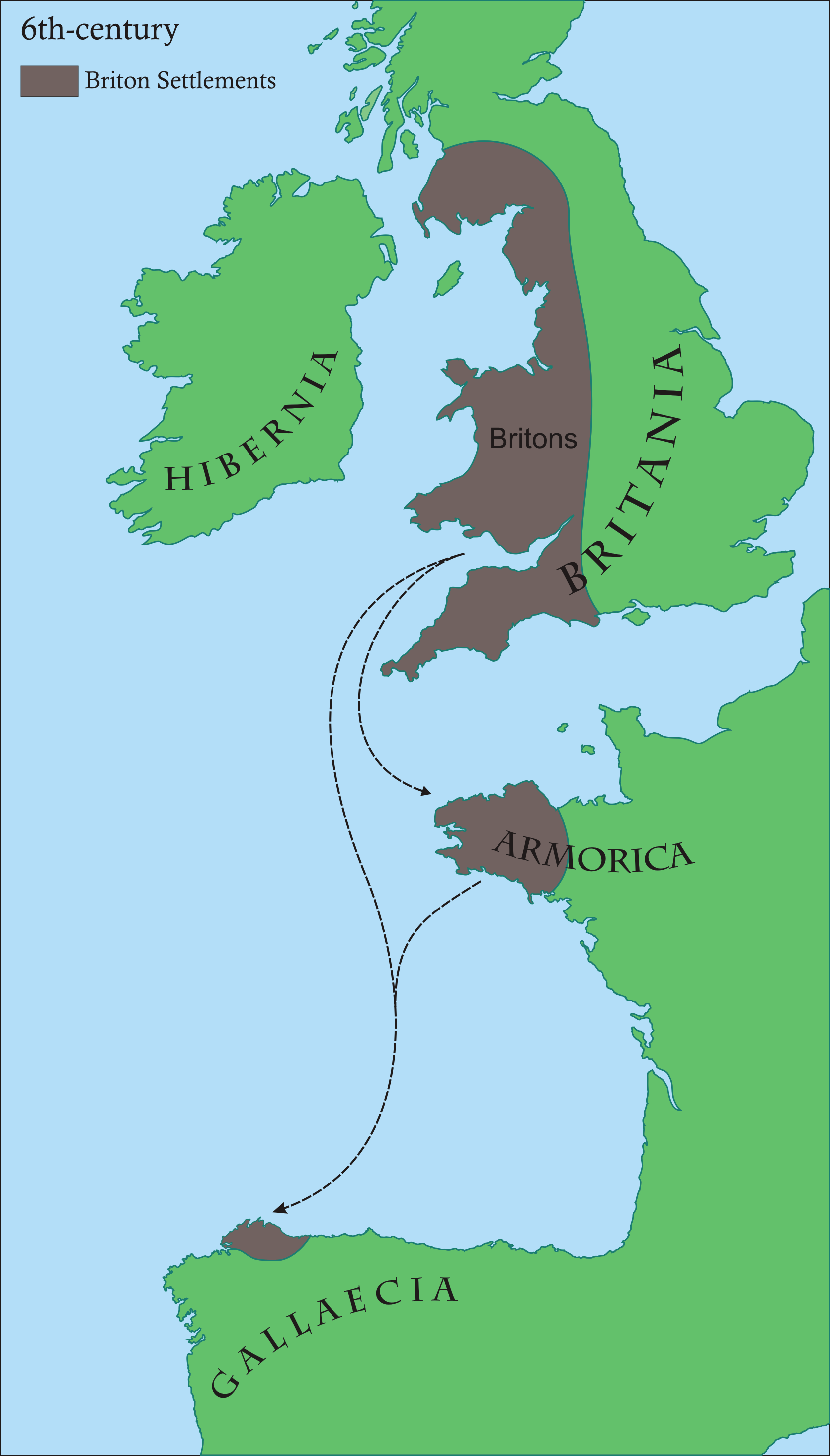
Continental Romano-Briton settlements in the 6th century

In the early stages the lowlands and cities may have had some organisation or "council" and the Bishop of London appears to have played a key role, but they were divided politically as former soldiers, mercenaries, nobles, officials and farmers declared themselves kings, fighting amongst each other and leaving Britain open to invasion. Two factions may have emerged: a pro-Roman faction and an independence faction. The one leader at this time known by name is Vortigern, which may have been a title meaning "High King". The depredations of the Picts from the north and Scotti (Scots) from Ireland forced the Britons to seek help from pagan Germanic tribes of Angles, Saxons and Jutes, who then decided to settle in Britain. Some of the Romano-British people migrated to Brittany, the Suebi Kingdom of Galicia and possibly Ireland.

The Anglo-Saxons obtained control of eastern England in the 5th century. In the mid-6th century, they started expanding into the Midlands, then in the 7th century they expanded again into the southwest and the north of England. The unconquered parts of southern Britain, notably Wales, retained their Romano-British culture, in particular retaining Christianity. Members of groups who spoke Germanic also migrated to the southern section of Great Britain. Cultural exchange is seen in the post-Roman period with these Germanic settlements.

Some Anglo-Saxon histories (in context) refer to the Romano-British people by the blanket term "Welsh". The term Welsh is derived from an Old English word meaning 'foreigner', referring to the old inhabitants of southern Britain. Historically, Wales and the south-western peninsula were known respectively as North Wales and West Wales. The Celtic north of England and southern Scotland was referred to in Welsh as Hen Ogledd ("old north").

The struggles of this period have given rise to the legends of Uther Pendragon and King Arthur. There are many theories, but it is sometimes said that Ambrosius Aurelianus, a resistance leader of the Romano-British forces, was the model for the former, and that Arthur's court of Camelot is an idealised Welsh and Cornish memory of pre-Saxon Romano-British civilisation.

== See also ==
- British Latin
- British Italians
- Daco-Roman
- Gallo-Roman culture
- Illyro-Roman
- Roman sites in the United Kingdom
- Romano-British temple
- Thraco-Roman

== Bibliography ==
- Jones, Michael (1996) The End of Roman Britain. Ithaca: Cornell University Press
- Myres, John (1960) Pelagius and the End of Roman Rule in Britain. In: Journal of Roman Studies, 50, 21–36.
- Pryor, Francis (2004) Britain AD: a Quest for Arthur, England and the Anglo-Saxons. London: HarperCollins ISBN 0-00-718186-8
- Radford, C. A. Ralegh (1939) Tintagel Castle. London: H.M.S.O. (Reprinted by English Heritage 1985)
- Thomas, Charles (1993) Tintagel: Arthur and Archaeology. London: English Heritage
