= Illyrian emperors =

Group of Roman emperors

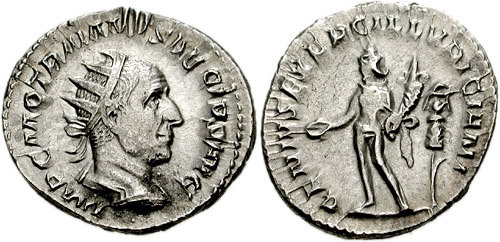
Silver coin of Roman emperor Trajan Decius (AD 249–251), with the inscription GENIVS EXERC[ITVS] ILLYRICIANI

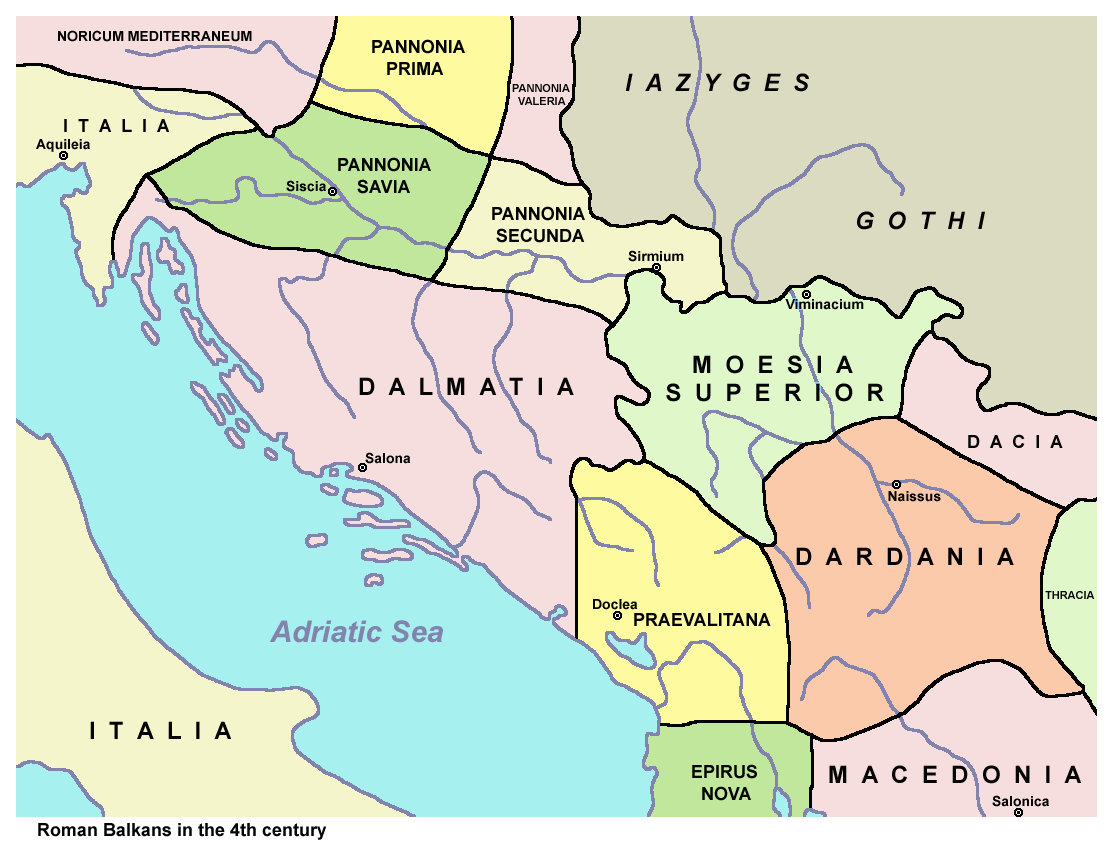
Provinces of the Western Balkans

The Illyrian emperors (Latin: Illyriciani) were a group of Roman emperors during the Crisis of the Third Century who hailed from the region of Illyria (Latin: Illyricum, in the Western Balkans), and were raised chiefly from the ranks of the Roman army (whence they are ranked among the so-called "barracks emperors"). In the empire the Illyrian generals had established a powerful military caste.

In the 3rd and 4th centuries, the Illyricum, which included the provinces on the Lower Danube (Dacia, Raetia, Pannonia, Moesia), held the largest concentration of Roman forces (12 legions, up to a third of the total army), and were a major recruiting ground. The advance of these low-born provincials was facilitated by a major shift in imperial policy from the time of Gallienus (253–268) on, when higher military appointments ceased to be exclusively filled by senators. Instead, professional soldiers of humble origin who had risen through the ranks to the post of primus pilus (which also entailed admission to the equestrian order) were placed as heads of the legions and filled the army's command structure.

Decius was born in Illyricum, but he hailed from a senatorial background, for this reason the historical period of the Illyrian emperors proper begins with Claudius Gothicus in 268 and continues in 284 with the rise of Diocletian and the institution of the Tetrarchy. This period was very important in the history of the Empire, since it represents the recovery from the Crisis of the Third Century, a long period of usurpations and military difficulties.

The later Valentinians (AD 364–392 and 425–455) also hailed from the Pannonia region.

== List ==
The following emperors are counted as Illyriciani:

- Claudius II, ruled AD 268–270
- Quintillus, ruled AD 270
- Aurelian, ruled AD 270–275
- Probus, ruled AD 276–282
- Diocletian, ruled AD 284–305
- Maximian, ruled AD 286–305
- Constantius I, ruled AD 305–306
- Severus II, ruled AD 306–307
- Constantine I, ruled AD 306–337
- Constantius II, ruled AD 337–361
- Jovian, ruled AD 363–364
- Valentinian I, ruled AD 364–375
- Valens, ruled AD 364–378
- Gratian, ruled AD 375–383
- Valentinian II, ruled AD 375–392
- Constantius III, ruled AD 421
- Valentinian III, ruled AD 425–455
- Anastasius I, ruled AD 491–518
- Justin I, ruled AD 518–527
- Justinian I, ruled AD 527–565

See also List of Roman emperors for more details.

== See also ==
- Thraco-Roman
- Illyro-Roman

== Sources ==
- Wilkes, John (1996) [1992]. The Illyrians. Wiley. ISBN 978-0-631-19807-9.
- Kuzmanović, Zorica; Mihajlović, Vladimir D. (2015). "Roman Emperors and Identity Constructions in Modern Serbia". Identities: Global Studies in Culture and Power. 22 (4): 416–432.
- Odahl, Charles Matson (2004). Constantine and the Christian Empire. Routledge. ISBN 0415174856.
- Williams, Stephen (1997). Diocletian and the Roman Recovery. Roman Imperial Biographies Series. Psychology Press. ISBN 9780415918275.
