= Susan Greenhalgh =

American anthropologist

Susan Greenhalgh is an American anthropologist who works on the intersections of science, the state, governance, and society in contemporary China. She is John King and Wilma Cannon Fairbank Professor of Chinese Society Emerita at Harvard University and researches the politics of reproduction, the obesity epidemic, and corporate science. In 2016, she was named a Guggenheim Fellow and a Walter Channing Cabot Fellow at Harvard University. Her book Just One Child: Science and Policy in Deng’s China (2008) was awarded the Joseph Levenson Book Prize.

== Early life and education ==
Greenhalgh earned her B.A. from Wellesley College and received her M.A. and Ph.D. from Columbia University, where she also earned a certificate in Chinese Studies.

== Career ==
She was a postdoctoral fellow at the Chinese Studies Center, University of California, Berkeley, and then worked at the Population Council in New York as a Berelson Fellow, staff associate, and senior research associate. She was a visiting scholar at Xi’an Jiaotong University (1988) and taught at Princeton University’s Woodrow Wilson School on separate occasions in 1993 and 1994.

From 1994 to 2011, Greenhalgh was on the faculty of the University of California, Irvine, where she was associate professor and later professor of anthropology. She was faculty-in-residence for the University of California Washington, D.C. program.

In 2011, she joined the Department of Anthropology at Harvard University, where she held the John King and Wilma Cannon Fairbank Professorship of Chinese Society. She became research professor in 2018 and professor emerita in 2023. She has also held visiting appointments at Academia Sinica in Taipei and at Tsinghua University in Beijing.

== Research ==
Greenhalgh’s scholarship investigates the entanglements of state, science, corporation, and society and their effects on the public's health and well-being. Her early work focused on state reproductive and population policies.

Greenhalgh has studied the origins, implementation, and broad effects of China’s one-child policy. Her work applied concepts of biopolitics and governmentality to state-directed population control projects, adapting ideas based on Western experiences to fit the Chinese context.

Her book Governing China's Population: From Leninist to Neoliberal Biopolitics (with Edwin A. Winckler, 2005) charts the construction since around 1980 of an apparatus for optimizing the quantity and quality of the population, the rise of a new field of biopolitics, and the shift from hard Leninist to softer, market-oriented forms of population governance.

Her book Global Citizens (2010) shows how, by transforming China's rural masses into more modern, entrepreneurial, self-directed workers and citizens, the governance of the population has helped foster China's global rise.

Since 2013, Greenhalgh’s research has examined corporate influence on science and public health policy, particularly the role of Western food and beverage companies in shaping obesity research. Her 2024 book Soda Science: Making the World Safe for Coca-Cola analyzes how industry-funded studies promoted the view that physical inactivity, rather than diet, is the main cause of obesity an argument that influenced health policies in the United States and China.

== Awards ==
She was named a Guggenheim Fellow (2016–17) and a Walter Channing Cabot Fellow at Harvard University (2016–17). Her book Just One Child won the 2010 Joseph Levenson Prize of the Association for Asian Studies and the Rachel Carson Prize of the Society for the Social Study of Science, and received honorable mentions for the Gregory Bateson Book Prize and the American Ethnological Society’s Senior Book Prize.

She received the Clifford C. Clogg Award for Early Career Achievement from the Population Association of America and the Olivia Schieffelin Nordberg Award for Excellence in Writing and Editing in the Population Sciences.

== Selected bibliography ==
- Greenhalgh, Susan (2024). Soda science: making the world safe for Coca-Cola. Chicago: The University of Chicago Press. ISBN 978-0-226-83473-3.
- "Can Science and Technology Save China? edited by Susan Greenhalgh and Li Zhang | Hardcover". Cornell University Press.
- Greenhalgh, Susan (2017-01-01). Fat-Talk Nation. Cornell University Press. ISBN 978-0-8014-5644-2.
- Greenhalgh, Susan (2010). Cultivating global citizens: population in the rise of China. Cambridge, Mass: Harvard University Press. ISBN 978-0-674-05571-1.
- Greenhalgh, Susan (2008). Greenhalgh, Susan (ed.). Just One Child: Science and Policy in Deng's China. Berkeley, CA: University of California Press. ISBN 978-0-520-25339-1.
- Winckler, Edwin A.; Greenhalgh, Susan, eds. (2005). Governing China's population: from Leninist to neoliberal biopolitics. Stanford, Calif: Stanford University Press. ISBN 978-0-8047-4880-3.
- Greenhalgh, Susan, ed. (2010). Under the medical gaze: facts and fictions of chronic pain. Berkeley: University of California Press. ISBN 978-0-520-22398-1.
- Greenhalgh, Susan, ed. (1995). Situating fertility: anthropology and demographic inquiry (1. publ ed.). Cambridge: Cambridge Univ. Press. ISBN 978-0-521-47044-5.
- Winckler, Edwin A.; Greenhalgh, Susan (2016). Contending approaches to the political economy of Taiwan. Taiwan in the Modern World. Armonk: Taylor and Francis. ISBN 978-1-315-49373-2.
