= Nadja Durbach =

American professor of History

Nadja Durbach is the Carroll J. Amundson Professor of British History at the University of Pittsburgh. She is a specialist of modern Britain and co-editor of the Journal of British Studies. Her research, grounded in her first book, Bodily Matters: The Anti-Vaccination Movement in England, 1853-1907(2005), focuses on immunization, vaccination, and alternative medicine politics in the nineteenth century. Her research has also focused on the history of the body and food politics in Britain. She was the recipient of a Guggenheim Fellowship in 2016.

Durbach received her B.A. from University of British Columbia in 1993 and her Ph.D. from Johns Hopkins University in 2001.

== Books ==
- Many Mouths: The Politics of Food in Britain From the Workhouse to the Welfare State (Cambridge: Cambridge University Press, 2020).
- Spectacle of Deformity: Freak Shows and Modern British Culture (Berkeley: University of California Press, 2010).
- Bodily Matters: The Anti-Vaccination Movement in England, 1853-1907 (Durham: Duke University Press, 2005).
