= Robert Spoo =

Law and English professor (born 1957)

Robert Edward Spoo (born 1957) is a professor and scholar of law and of English, an academic of the law and literature movement, and a Guggenheim Fellowship awardee. From 1988 to 2023, he taught at the University of Tulsa; he joined Princeton University as an endowed professor in 2024.

== Biography ==
Born in 1957, Spoo was educated at Lawrence University, and received a BA degree in English in 1979. This was followed by MA (1984) and PhD (1986) degrees in English from Princeton University. Spoo worked as a lecturer at Princeton from 1984 until he joined the University of Tulsa in 1988. He received his JD from Yale Law School in 2000. He held positions as an attorney at various firms between 2000 and 2008, often simultaneously with his academic appointments. From 2001 to 2002, he was a law clerk of Sonia Sotomayor.

In 2012, Spoo was promoted to Chapman Distinguished Professor at the University of Tulsa College of Law. While at Tulsa, he also served as editor of the James Joyce Quarterly. He was a 2016 Guggenheim Fellow. In 2020, the University of Tulsa named Spoo an "outstanding researcher." Effective on January 1, 2024, Spoo joined the faculty of Princeton University as the endowed Leonard L. Milberg '53 Professor in Irish Letters.

Spoo is editor of the Oxford University Press Law and Literature series and author of James Joyce and the Language of History (1994), Without Copyrights (2013), and Modernism and the Law (2018), the latter written with support of his Guggenheim Fellowship. On top of his scholarship on James Joyce, he also published Ezra and Dorothy Pound: Letters in Captivity, 1945–1946, a 1999 book about Ezra Pound.
