= Daco-Roman =

Romanized culture of Dacia under the Roman Empire

The term Daco-Roman describes the Romanized culture of Dacia under the rule of the Roman Empire.

== Etymology ==
The Daco-Roman mixing theory, as an origin for the Romanian people, was formulated by the earliest Romanian scholars, beginning with Dosoftei from Moldavia, in the 17th century, followed in the early 1700s in Transylvania, through the Romanian Uniate clergy and in Wallachia, by the historian Constantin Cantacuzino in his Istoria Țării Rumânești dintru început ("History of Wallachia from the beginning"), and continued to amplify during the 19th and 20th centuries.

Another likely origin for romanian people might be the similar Thraco-Roman culture, from Moesia.

== Famous individuals ==
- Regalianus was a Roman usurper and became himself emperor for a brief period of time.
- Aureolus was a Roman military commander and would-be usurper against Gallienus.
- Galerius, Roman emperor from 305 to 311, though half Thracian from his father's part.
- Maximinus Daza, Roman emperor from 310 to 313
- Licinius, Roman emperor from 308 to 324.
- Ulpia Severina (fl. 3rd century), the wife of the Emperor Aurelian whose nomen Ulpius was widespread in all the provinces along the Danube may have been from Dacia.
- Sponsianus, a possible usurping Roman emperor in Dacia known only through coin evidence.

== See also ==
- Culture of Ancient Rome
- Dacian language
- Eastern Romance substratum
- Romanian language
- Origin of the Romanians
- Romance languages
- Legacy of the Roman Empire
- The Balkan linguistic union
- History of Romania
- Thraco-Roman
- Illyro-Roman
- Gallo-Roman
- Romano-British culture
