= Juri Seo =

South Korean composer (born 1981)

- Born: December 31, 1981 (age 44); South Korea
- Education: Accademia Nazionale di Santa Cecilia; Yonsei University; University of Illinois Urbana-Champaign
- Occupation: Composer
- Employer: Princeton University
- Awards: Guggenheim Fellowship (2016)

Academic background
- Thesis: Jonathan Harvey's string quartets (2013)
- Doctoral advisor: Reynold Tharp
- Musical career
- Genres: Contemporary classical music
- Label: Innova Records

Juri Seo (Korean: 서주리; born December 31, 1981) is a South Korean composer. A 2016 Guggenheim Fellow, she has released several albums, two of which were with Innova Recordings. She is also Professor at the Princeton University Department of Music.

== Biography ==
Juri Seo was born on December 31, 1981 in South Korea. She studied at the Accademia Nazionale di Santa Cecilia under Ivan Fedele, and obtained her bachelor of arts degree at Yonsei University and her master of music and doctor of musical arts degrees at University of Illinois Urbana-Champaign. Her doctoral dissertation Jonathan Harvey's string quartets (2013) was supervised by Reynold Tharp.

She is Professor of Music at the Princeton University Department of Music. She was awarded an American Academy of Arts and Letters Goddard Lieberson Fellowship in 2014. In 2016, she was awarded a Guggenheim Fellowship.

She released two albums with Innova Recordings: Mostly Piano (2017) and Respiri (2019). Andrew Stock of I Care If You Listen said that the latter "illuminates some of [her] core aesthetic preoccupations through a trio of key works". In 2021, she was awarded an Andrew Imbrie Award in Music in 2021. She released another album Toy Store, a collaboration with violinist Jinjoo Cho, through Carrier Records on May 5, 2024. She performed the main titular piece for Wonkak Kim and Eunhye Grace Choi's album Arcade, which Patrick Hanudel of the American Record Guide called a "spunky opener".

Hyeseon Jin cites the South Korean state and Korean traditional music as inspirations for Seo's work.

She is from Princeton, New Jersey.
