= Illyro-Roman =

Culture of Illyria under the rule of the Roman Empire

Illyro-Roman is a term used in historiography and anthropological studies for the Romanized Illyrians within the ancient Roman provinces of Illyricum, Dalmatia, Moesia, Pannonia and Dardania.

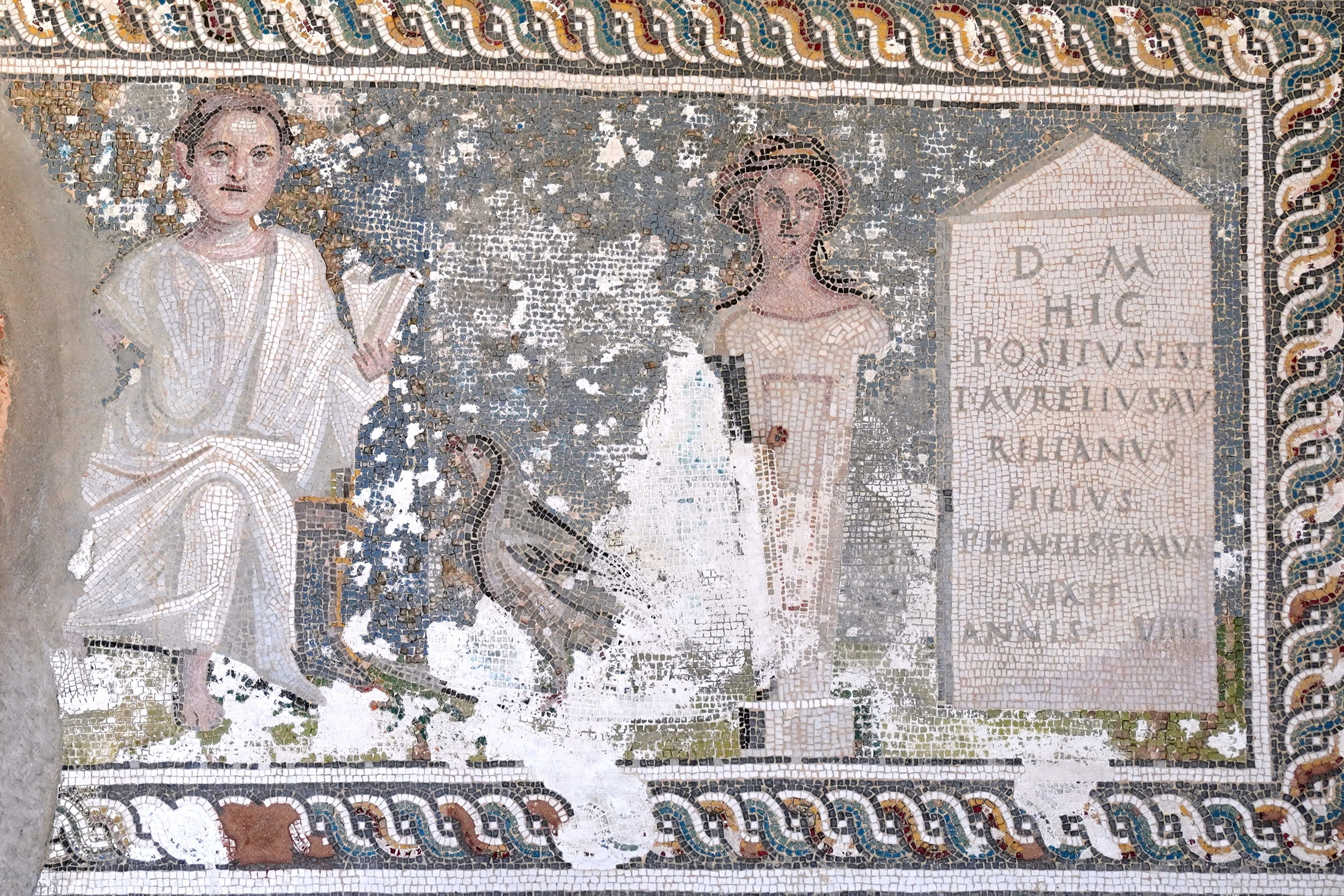
A 3rd Century AD Roman mosaic depicting the deceased Aurelius Aurelianus beside his tombstone and a bust from the Split Archaeological Museum, Croatia

== Before Rome ==
The Illyrian tribes were considered barbarians by both the Romans and the Hellenic peoples in the southern Balkans. The term Illyrian originally denoted one tribe that lived around Lake Scutari situated along the border of Albania and Montenegro. They were considered among the vast group of barbarian peoples such as the Gauls, Germans, and Dacians. The conquest of Illyria in 168 BC, along with that of Epirus, consolidated the Roman domain over the Adriatic Sea. The mountainous geography of the region meant that the region was hard to subdue, but by 9 CE the Great Illyrian Revolt had been quelled and from then on the region would supply large numbers of non-citizen soldiers to the Roman Auxilia.

== During the Empire ==
The Romanization of these barbarian peoples eventually transformed them into the most valuable soldiers of the Late Roman Army, with a substantial portion of the officials and generals coming from a northern balkanic background, such as Illyria, Dalmatia, Pannonia and Moesia. One emperor, Decius, several usurpers and during the reign of Gallienus, who started the professionalization of the high command of the army, large numbers of soldiers achieved high rank within the army. They took the place which the Senatorial order had had the privilege of holding since the time of Augustus, 250 years earlier, the command of the legions and armed provinces.

== Roman colonization ==
Illyricum was heavily colonized by the Romans beginning in the third century BC. The Romans founded the cities of Acruvium, Cibalae, Mursa, Narona, Siscia, and established colonies at Salona, Sirmium, Epidaurum, Aequum, Iader, Rhizon, and in many other cities. These cities were colonized by Roman war veterans.

== The Illyrian emperors ==
It was from this group that the most successful emperors of the time came from and it was they who brought the Crisis of the Third Century to an end. Examples include Claudius II Gothicus, Aurelian, Probus and later on Anastasius I Dicorus. There was also the case of Justinian, who was noted for undertaking large-scale political and legislative reform that restructured the Roman empire. He was born in 482 near Scupi (modern Skopje) to an obscure Illyro-Roman family and became an associate emperor to his uncle, Justin I, who adopted him. However, other sources note that Justinian came from a Thraco-Roman background. The creator of the Tetrarchy Diocletian and his fellow Tetrarchs Maximian, Constantius Chlorus (father of the first Christian emperor Constantine) and Severus II were also of Illyro-Roman background.

There are scholars who note that the military spirit and Latin education of the Roman emperors with Illyrian stock often conflicted with the contemporary ideals of an ancient culture, which is based on classical Greek.

== Middle Ages ==
During the Middle Ages, the descendants of the Illyro-Romans influenced the growth of the Balkan peninsula. It is said that their wandering enterprise facilitated commerce and opened ancient trade routes. These people had access to an old Roman road network, which seemed to be known only among themselves. Artifacts excavated (e.g. sepulchral slabs) in Serbia showed Illyro-Roman workmanship that favored decorations that were rude almost to grotesqueness. It is believed that Illyro-Roman inhabitants of this particular site copied the style from their ancient Illyro-Roman predecessors.

== Romance linguistical remnants ==
- Dalmatian language

== See also ==
- Culture of Ancient Rome
- Legacy of the Roman Empire
- Origin of the Albanians
- Albanians in Italy
- Arbëreshë people
- Daco-Roman
- Gallo-Roman
- Thraco-Roman
- Tetrarchy

== Sources ==
- Arthur Evans (2006). Ancient Illyria: An Archaeological Exploration. I.B.Tauris. ISBN 978-1-84511-167-0.
