= Reynold Tharp =

Reynold Tharp (born June 17, 1973) is an American composer of contemporary classical music. His music reflects a fascination with transitory physical aspects of sound, such as resonance and decay.

Tharp was born in Indiana, and studied music composition and history at Oberlin College before entering the graduate program in composition at the University of California, Berkeley. As a recipient of the university's Ladd Fellowship, he spent two years in Paris studying composition with Philippe Leroux and orchestration with Marc-André Dalbavie. He was selected for the Stage d'Automne at IRCAM in 2000 and has participated in workshops and seminars with Ivan Fedele, Brian Ferneyhough, and Jonathan Harvey.

Tharp's music has been performed in the U.S. and Europe by groups such as the Berkeley Contemporary Chamber Players, the Orchestre Lyrique de Region Avignon-Provence and the Nieuw Ensemble (Amsterdam), which commissioned and premiered his work A Backward Glance in 2000. Several of these performances have been broadcast on French and Dutch radio.

Awards for his music include BMI's William Schuman Prize, Columbia University's Joseph H. Bearns Prize for his orchestral work Drift, and UC Berkeley's Nicola DeLorenzo Prize. Tharp was commissioned by the Irving M. Klein International String Competition, the San Francisco Contemporary Music Players for its 2008–09 season, and by flute and harp duo Jonathan Keeble and Ann Yeung.

Tharp has taught composition, orchestration, analysis, and theory at the University of Illinois at Urbana-Champaign, UC Berkeley, Northwestern University, and San Francisco State University.

== Compositions ==
- "Wide sea, changeful heaven" for orchestra (2012)
- "Red-winged Blackbird", for flute, violin, and viola (2012)
- "Chaparral (Cantilena alla memoria di John Thow)" for flute and harp (2011)
- "Anima Liberata", for soprano, cello, and piano (2010)
- San Francisco Night, for eight players (2008)
- Vertiginous Lines, for solo violin (2006)
- Fog Lines, for solo viola (2006)
- Wavering Lines, for solo cello (2006)
- Littoral, for solo piano (2006)
- Mountains and Seas, for piano and percussion (2005)
- Cold Horizon, for chamber orchestra (2003–5)
- In Passing, for chamber orchestra (2001)
- Cold, for vibraphone and piano (2000, rev. 2002)
- Dis-moi vite, for chamber ensemble (2000)
- A Backward Glance, for 12 players (1999)
- Far and Away, for string quartet (1998)
- Etching, for cor anglais, clarinet, viola, and piano (1997)
- Drift, for orchestra (1996)
- Three Fables, for flute and string quartet (1996)
