= Ralph W. Mathisen =

American ancient historian (born 1947)

- Born: February 17, 1947 (age 79)
- Citizenship: United States
- Scientific career
- Thesis: The Ecclesiastical Aristocracy of Fifth-Century Gaul: A Regional Analysis of Family Structure

Ralph Whitney Mathisen (born February 17, 1947) is an American ancient historian, specializing in the history of Late antiquity. Currently he is the Professor of History, Classics, and Medieval Studies at the University of Illinois Urbana-Champaign. From 1996 to 2004 he was the Louise Fry Scudder Professor of Humanities at the University of South Carolina. He also has served the founding editor of the Journal of Late Antiquity and one of the editors of Late Antiquity Newsletter, Medieval Prosopography and De Imperatoribus Romanis.

== Biography ==
Mathisen graduated from the University of Wisconsin–Madison in 1969 with a bachelor of science in astrophysics and later graduated from Rensselaer Polytechnic Institute–Hartford with a master of science in mechanical engineering. In 1973 he graduated from the University of Wisconsin–Madison with a bachelor of arts in classics. In 1979 he received a PhD in ancient history with the dissertation The Ecclesiastical Aristocracy of Fifth-Century Gaul: A Regional Analysis of Family Structure.

In 1980 Mathisen was a visiting professor in Roman history at the University of Illinois Chicago Circle, and in 2013 a visiting fellow of the University of Leuven. From 1991 to 2004 he was a professor (later the Louise Fry Scudder Professor of Humanities and the Director of Biographical Database for Late Antiquity) at the University of South Carolina. Currently he is a professor of history, classics, and medieval studies at the University of Illinois Urbana-Champaign.

== Member of editorial boards ==
- De Imperatoribus Romanis (from 1996).
- Founding editor of the Journal of Late Antiquity (2007—2013).
- Dialogues d'histoire ancienne (from 2003).
- Oxford Studies in Late Antiquity (from 2007).
- Late Antiquity Newsletter (1996—2004).
- Medieval Prosopography (from 1993).
- Polis. Rivista de ideas y formes politicas de la Antigüedad Classica (from 1993).

== Awards and honours ==
- Fellowship of the American Numismatic Society (1997).
- Guggenheim Fellowship (2016).
- Codex Award from the Council of Editors of Learned Journals (like a Journal of Late Antiquity editor) (2013).
- Bronze Medal from the American Numismatic Association Convention.

== Selected bibliography ==
- Mathisen, Ralph W. (2017). Sources for Ancient Mediterranean Civilizations: Texts, Maps and Images (Illustrated and annotated ed.). New York: Oxford University Press. pp. 1–578. ISBN 9780190280918.
- Mathisen, Ralph W. (2014) [2012]. Ancient Mediterranean Civilizations: From Prehistory to 640 CE (Second ed.). New York: Oxford University Press. pp. 1–608. ISBN 9780199384457.
- Mathisen, Ralph W.; Shanzer, Danuta [in German] (2012). The Battle of Vouillé, 507 CE: Where France Began (PDF). Millennium-Studien / Millennium Studies. Vol. 37. Berlin & New York: De Gruyter. pp. 1–242. doi:10.1515/9781614510994. ISBN 9781614510994. LCCN 2021758920 – via OAPEN Library.
- Mathisen, Ralph W. (2013) [1993]. Roman Aristocrats in Barbarian Gaul: Strategies for Survival in an Age of Transition (Second ed.). Austin: University of Texas Press. pp. 1–293. doi:10.7560/770515. ISBN 9780292758070.
- Mathisen, Ralph W.; Shanzer, Danuta, eds. (2011). Romans, Barbarians, and the Transformation of the Roman World: Cultural Interaction and the Creation of Identity in Late Antiquity. Farham: Ashgate Publishing. pp. 1–378. ISBN 9780754668145.
- Mathisen, Ralph W. (2003). People, Personal Expression, and Social Relations in Late Antiquity. Vol. 1: With Translated Texts from Gaul and Western Europe, and People, Personal Expression, and Social Relations in Late Antiquity. Ann Arbor: University of Michigan Press. pp. 1–248. ISBN 9780754606246.
- Mathisen, Ralph W. (2003). People, Personal Expression, and Social Relations in Late Antiquity. Vol. 2: Selected Latin Texts from Gaul and Western Europe. Ann Arbor: University of Michigan Press. pp. 1–296. ISBN 9780472112463.
- Mathisen, Ralph W.; Shanzer, Danuta, eds. (2001). Society and Culture in Late Antique Gaul. Revisiting the Sources. Farham: Ashgate Publishing. pp. 1–328. ISBN 9780754606246.
- Mathisen, Ralph W., ed. (2001). Law, Society, and Authority in Late Antiquity. New York: Oxford University Press. pp. 1–324. ISBN 9780199240326.
- Ruricius I (1999). Mathisen, Palph W. (ed.). Ruricius of Limoges and Friends: A Collection of Letters from Visigothic Aquitania. Translated Texts for Historians. Vol. 303. Translated by Ralph W. Mathisen. Liverpool: Liverpool University Press. pp. 1–289. ISBN 9780853237037.
- Mathisen, Ralph W.; Sivan, Hagith, eds. (1996). Shifting Frontiers in Late Antiquity. Collected Studies Series. Farham: Ashgate Publishing. pp. 1–383. ISBN 9780860785880.
- Mathisen, Ralph W. (1991). Studies in the History, Literature, and Society of Late Antiquity (Reprinted ed.). Amsterdam: Adolf M. Hakkert. pp. 1–449. ISBN 9789025609832.
- Mathisen, Ralph W. (1989). Ecclesiastical Factionalism and Religious Controversy in Fifth-Century Gaul. ACLS Humanities E-Book. Washington, DC: The Catholic University of America Press. pp. 1–347. ISBN 9780813206585.
