= Patrick Webb (artist) =

American visual artist

- Born: 1955 (age 70–71); New York, New York, United States
- Education: Yale University, Skowhegan School of Painting and Sculpture, Maryland Institute College of Art
- Known for: Painting
- Awards: John Simon Guggenheim Memorial Foundation, National Academy Museum, National Endowment for the Arts, Ingram Merrill Foundation
- Website: Patrick Webb

Patrick Webb (born 1955) is an American artist who has portrayed contemporary queer experience through representational narrative paintings. He is best known for his "Punchinello" paintings, begun in the early 1990s, which feature a gay "everyman" based on the Italian commedia dell'arte stock character, Pulcinella. Art historians Jonathan D. Katz and Jonathan Weinberg place Webb among artists who that gave voice to the loss and grief associated with the AIDS epidemic by looking beyond the message-heavy activist art and anti-expressive postmodernism of the 1980s to reinvigorated art-historical narrative traditions. Writers note his work for its classically influenced technique and pathos in fleshing out fears, fantasies, experiences and social dichotomies between self and Other, individual and collective, personal and sociocultural. He draws on pictorial strategies from old masters as well as modern artists such as Balthus, Jacob Lawrence, Philip Guston and the magic realist Jared French, building scenarios out of architecturally structured compositions, carefully placed elements and precise gestures.

Patrick Webb, Punchinello in America, oil on canvas, 108" x 255", 1995.

Webb has received a Guggenheim Fellowship (2016) and awards from the National Endowment for the Arts and National Academy Museum, among others. He has been a professor at Pratt Institute in Brooklyn since 1995 and lives with his husband, a psychoanalyst, in New York City.

== Early life and career ==
Webb was born in New York City in 1955. He grew up in a culturally rich environment that included museum and opera visits with his mother, a painter and sculptor, and his father, a partner at Noonday Press; intellectuals such as Richard Hofstadter, Irving Howe and Alfred Kazin were among their social circle. Webb studied art at the Maryland Institute College of Art (BFA, 1976), Skowhegan School of Painting and Sculpture (1977), and Yale University (MFA, 1979) with a classical orientation that focused on observational painting, the analysis of art-historical compositions, and the duplication of old-master techniques.

After graduating, Webb taught at the University of Wisconsin Oshkosh and Cornell University, before moving to New York City in 1983. By that time, he had begun to exhibit in Boston (Alpha Gallery) and New York (Odyssia Galleries); over the next decade, he would be featured in group exhibitions at the Butler Institute of American Art, Minnesota Museum of American Art and Clocktower Gallery ("Positive Actions: Visual AIDS," 1990), among others. In his later career, Webb has been featured at institutions including the Provincetown Art Museum (2008, 25-year survey), Bronx Museum, Tacoma Art Museum, and Leslie-Lohman Museum of Art.

Webb's early work depicted figures with a playful eroticism in city scenes and landscapes informed by artists such as Edwin Dickinson. According to Nancy Grimes, in that work he sought a visual language to express gay experience "in an unembarrassed, straightforward manner, free from cliché and sentimentality." By the late 1980s, with the increasing threat and tragedy of the AIDS epidemic, Webb turned to desperate and angry, monumental images of street battles, fires and parades, with queer identity emerging as a more pronounced theme. He often reworked classical paintings in these canvasses, undermining mainstream cultural and sexual norms, as in the six-by-eighteen-foot triptych, Halloween Parade (1989), an allegory of death inspired by the annual Greenwich Village parade, which restaged Mantegna's Triumph of Caesar in queer terms.

Patrick Webb, Punchinello Works Out: Shiva, oil on canvas, 46" x 22", 1999.

== "Punchinello" paintings ==
In 1990, Webb began painting works that reinterpreted Pulcinella—a masked, red-beaked commedia dell'arte trickster or fool he encountered in the work of Giovanni Domenico Tiepolo—as a contemporary gay everyman, "Punchinello," who would serve as a malleable, repeatable protagonist and surrogate in his work. He was drawn to the character’s clownish naivete, his sexually provocative, phallic red nose and white hat, and mask, which marked him as a cipher-like outsider who could be simultaneously specific, anonymous and universal. Writers suggest that these qualities lend a tragic-comic poignancy and alienated, determined heroism to the character as he struggles for individuality and identity through rites of passage, everyday experiences, social conflict, and being a witness to and sufferer within the AIDS crisis. Webb has described the Punchinello paintings as reflecting "the humanist belief that human experience is what matters."

=== Early "Punchinello" paintings (1990–9) ===
Poet Stanley Kunitz described Webb's early cycles as "brilliant and mordant evocations of a twentieth-century Carnival of Death [that] confront the terrible with an irony that enriches and deepens the ultimate pathos." Much of this work was featured in his first New York solo exhibition at Amos Eno Gallery in 1993. His first cycle, Punchinello: A Life, 1957–1990, offered a terse narrative in five diptychs, tracing a journey from birth through adolescence and sexual awakening to adulthood and premature death from a disease suggesting AIDS. The diptych, Lamentation / By Punchinello's Bed (1990–2), was inspired by the artist's hospital visit to his dying and then deceased boyfriend, Chris Kales, who while suffering from AIDS was only reluctantly touched by caregivers. The work draws on Christian martyr iconography and was included in the traveling historical survey, "Art AIDS America" (2015–7); it belongs to the Leslie-Lohman Museum of Art. The diptych took on personal significance as a representation of Webb's experience of witnessing his lover’s death and anticipating his own death after he also tested positive for HIV. Poet Mark Doty has written that Punchinello's mask provided a "safe distance" allowing Webb to "portray the sorrows of the AIDS epidemic with a particularly compelling gravity and grace." In the four-painting cycle, Punchinello in America (1995, 9' x 22' mural composition), Webb's focus turned from loss to anger, portraying the character fighting back in street demonstrations and court, being brutally lynched, and ultimately emerging victorious.

In two later cycles, Webb explored corporeality, vulnerability, and the world of the body as an allegory for his own revitalization and the discovery that he was not dying. "Punchinello Goes West" (1996) was inspired by a trip to West Texas and comprised 18 sequential paintings portraying a playful and poignant journey into American myth. They present Punchinello testing himself in the open landscape and rodeo, running with the Javalinas, and having encounters in saloons and bunkhouses. The "Punchinello Works Out" series (1997–2001) explored mortality, age and desire through depictions of him as a frail figure straining alongside buff men in a subterranean New York gym. The images—of compressed spaces fragmented by mirrors and machines—took Webb's work in a flatter, more abstract direction, highlighting the sense of structure and pattern that had always underlaid his painting.

Patrick Webb, Sunday Brunch, oil on canvas, 36" x 32", 2003.

=== Later "Punchinello" paintings (2000– ) ===
Webb's work in the 2000s increasingly suggested Punchinello's transition from doomed character to survivor. Several cycles—"Home" (2003–5), "Married Life," and "Punchinello Unloads" (both 2007–10)—place him in ordinary, intimate or comically sad domestic narratives or heavy manual-labor scenarios. Other works coupled erotic attraction and menace. These include the "Cheat" series (2004–5), Punchinello and the Law: Contra Natum (2000)—which depicts him trying to be inconspicuous as he walks past an unsmiling, mustached beat cop—or Saved II (2002–3) and Fallen (2001–3), in which he is rescued by a fireman and a paramedic. A later cycle casts him in populated New York streets as various opera persona (e.g., Punchinello as Figaro, 2007–10); ARTnews critic Alex Taylor described the juxtaposition of unremarkable city scenes and the character's slightly bewildering masked presence as conveying a "beauty in strangeness" and "eerie sense of dislocation." City Art noted the work of this period for its "finely sculpted faces, rhythmic silhouettes and minutely choreographed gestures," likening it to paintings by Piero della Francesca and Balthus.

The work in Webb's exhibitions "Night and Day" (2011) and "On the Beach at Night" (2012) reintegrated landscape into his work and was a departure from the light, high-keyed colors of his daytime street scenes. Metaphors for life and death, these paintings were inspired by memory, childhood experiences of Cape Cod, and the deaths of his mother and father. They echoed Baroque Tenebrist paintings and were among his most abstract and least figurative works to date, with largely implied forms—Punchinello among family, in bacchanals with other men disrobing and rolling around—emerging out of nocturnal seaside bonfire scenes that Webb studied firsthand by sketching direct paintings on the beach with a spelunking light strapped to his forehead.

Patrick Webb, Tinker Tailor Soldier Sailor, oil on canvas, 60" x 119", 2013–9.

Between 2013 and 2018, Webb created his atmospheric, sixty-two-canvas "Tinker Tailor" series, which uses the British nursery rhyme as a launching point for a carnivalesque world of Punchinellos incarnating multiple identities, anachronistic activities, childhood experiences and screen memories. Jonathan Katz called the masked character an apt figuration of queerness: a "fraught combination of a camouflaged, yet excessive, performance of selfhood." In 2020, Webb created "The COVID Paintings," a wide-ranging series that connects that epidemic and its associated isolation to his earlier works about HIV, while drawing on themes and paintings from throughout his career and art history. One of these works, Covid: Central Park, was awarded the Gold Medal for the competitive exhibition "Covid Dreams" sponsored by Artavita.

== Awards and recognition ==
Webb has been awarded fellowships from the John Simon Guggenheim Foundation (2016), Art Matters (1992), and the National Endowment for the Arts (1988, 1986, 1984). He has received awards from the National Academy Museum (Thomas B. Clarke Award in Painting, 1988), the Ingram Merrill Foundation (1995, 1989) and Artavita (2020). In addition to teaching at Pratt, he has been a visiting artist at Cranbrook, Johns Hopkins University, Maryland Institute College of Art, Rhode Island School of Design and Yale University, among others.

Webb's work belongs to the public collections of the Boston Public Library, Leslie-Lohman Museum of Art, Provincetown Art Association and Museum, Queensboro College Museum (CUNY), Rose Art Museum, University of Wisconsin Oshkosh, and Zimmerli Art Museum, in addition to several corporate collections. His paintings are reproduced in several books on American art, including Male Desire: The Homoerotic in American Art (2005) by Jonathan Weinberg, Art AIDS America (2015) by Jonathan Katz and Rock Hushka, and Queer Holdings: A Survey of the Leslie-Lohman Museum Collection (2020).
