= Matthew Jensen (artist) =

American conceptual landscape artist and photographer

Matthew López-Jensen (Matthew Jensen) (American, born 1980) is a conceptual landscape artist and photographer based in the Bronx, New York. His work has been exhibited in the Metropolitan Museum of Art and the National Gallery of Art. He currently teaches photography and art at Parsons School of Design at The New School in New York City and at Fordham University in the Bronx.

== Education ==
López-Jensen received a BA in political science and fine art from Rice University in 2002 and an MFA in photography from the University of Connecticut in 2008.

== Works and critical reception ==
López-Jensen is the recipient of a Guggenheim Fellowship, Peter S. Reed Foundation Grant and his work has twice received support from the National Endowment for the Arts. His work has been described as exploring "our relationship to the natural world and ... environment." He is the author of two books that combine photography and contributions from local experts and employees, Park Wonder (Paper Crown Press, 2016) and The Work and the Water: Labor and Landscapes along the Erie Canal (Inventory Press, 2025). He was the first artist-in-residence with the Erie Canal in 2023.

== Walking and mapping ==
López-Jensen has designed public walks and free maps for groups and venues, including: Open Spaces Kansas City, Green-Wood Cemetery, The High Line Art, Brooklyn Museum, and Visual Art Center of New Jersey.
