= Thraco-Roman =

Term for the Romanized culture of the Thracians under imperial rule

The term Thraco-Roman describes the Romanized culture of Thracians under the rule of the Roman Empire.

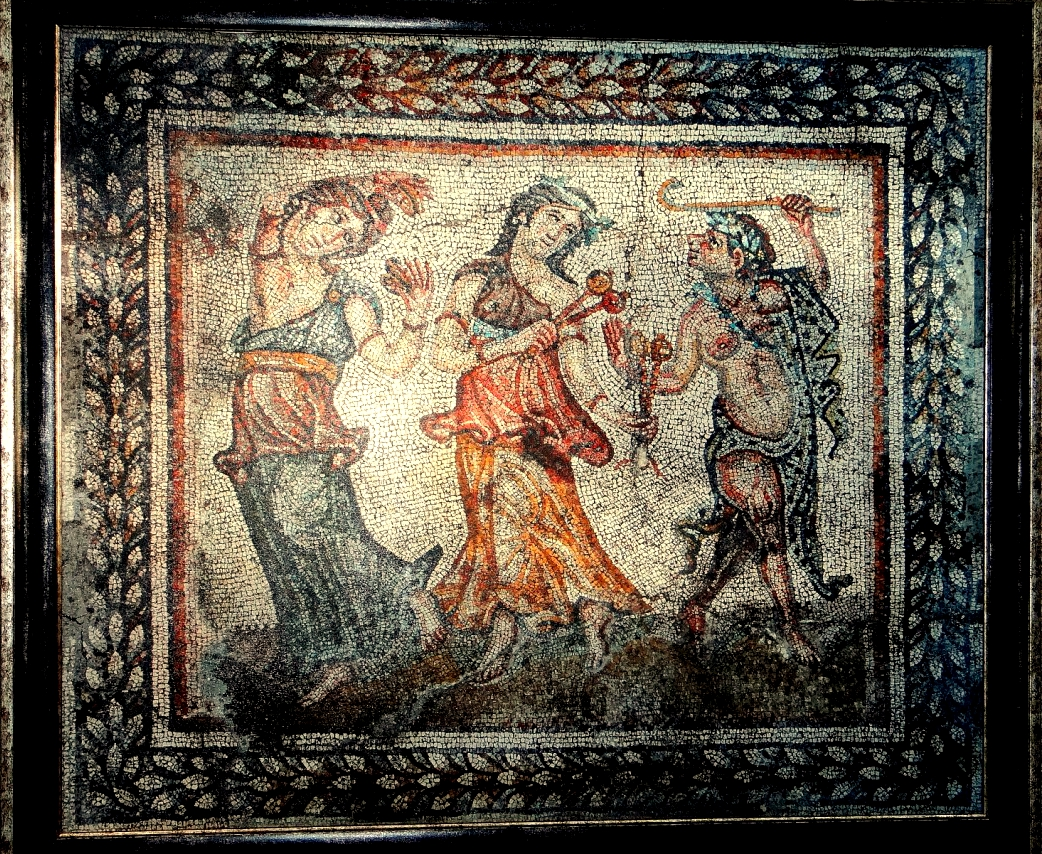
"Dionysus's Procession”, a 4th century AD Roman mosaic in the city of Augusta Trajana (modern-day Stara Zagora, Bulgaria)

The Odrysian kingdom of Thrace became a Roman client kingdom c. 20 BC, while the Greek city-states on the Black Sea coast came under Roman control, first as civitates foederatae ("allied" cities with internal autonomy). After the death of the Thracian king Rhoemetalces III in 46 AD and an unsuccessful anti-Roman revolt, the kingdom was annexed as the Roman province of Thracia. The northern Thracians (Getae-Dacians) formed a unified kingdom of Dacia before being conquered by the Romans in 106. Their territory became the Roman province of Dacia.

== Archaeological sites ==
- The Thraco-Roman villa rustica near Chatalka, Stara Zagora, Bulgaria
- Thraco-Roman cult complex built in the rocks near Strelkovo, Bulgaria
- Diocletianopolis, (modern Hisarya, Bulgaria), named after emperor Diocletian, it used to be a major Roman spa city.

== Famous individuals ==
This is a list of several important Thraco-Roman individuals:

- Maximinus Thrax, Roman emperor from 235 to 238. His nickname "Thrax" which means "Thracian" is due to his origins.
- Regalianus, Roman general and imperial usurper.
- Aureolus, Roman military commander and imperial usurper.
- Galerius, Roman emperor from 305 to 311.
- Licinius, Roman emperor from 308 to 324.
- Maximinus Daza, Roman emperor from 310 to 313.
- Constantine the Great, Roman emperor and member of Thetrarchy, from 306 to 337. He was born in Naissus, Dacia Mediterranea and according to one of his dynastic member Julian, his family was of Thracian origin from the Moesi tribe. Thus, the Constantinian dynasty was one of the Thraco-Roman dynasties.
- Julian, who mentions in his book Misopogon that his family is of Thracian origin.
- Flavius Aetius, Roman general, called the "last of the Romans".
- Marcian, Byzantine emperor from 450 to 457.
- Leo I, Byzantine emperor from 457 to 474. He is also called "Thrax". His dynasty called Leonid were commonly referred as the "Thracian dynasty".
- John Cassian, a 4th-century monk who contributed to bringing the Egyptian monastic tradition to western Europe. Born in Scythia Minor and died near modern-day Marseille, southern France.
- Dionysius Exiguus, a 6th-century monk born in Scythia Minor, most likely of local Thraco-Roman origin.
- Justin I, Byzantine emperor from 518 to 527, was of Thraco-Roman origin. He was the father of Justinian I who was referred by John Malalas as being a Thracian.
- Vitalian, Byzantine general who rebelled in 513 against emperor Anastasius I (r. 491–518). Vitalian may have been of local Thracian stock, born in Scythia Minor or in Moesia; his father bore a Latin name, Patriciolus, while two of his sons had Thracian names and one a Gothic name.
- Justinian I, Byzantine emperor from 527 to 565. Born in Tauresium around 482. His Latin-speaking peasant family was of Thraco-Roman origin as John Malalas writes.
- Belisarius, general during the reign of Justinian I. He was born in Germane (nowadays Sapareva Banya) in western Thrace or in Germania in Dacia Mediterranea, possibly of Thraco-Roman or Greek origin.
- Martin, Byzantine general of Thracian origin, Magister Militum per Armeniam.
- Justin II, nephew of Justinian, and Byzantine emperor from 565 to 578. He was a member of the Justinian dynasty, which is one of the Thraco-Roman dynasties.
- Tiberius II Constantine, count of the Excubitors, and Byzantine emperor from 578 to 582.
- Phocas, Byzantine emperor from 602 to 610.

== See also ==
- Daco-Roman
- Illyro-Roman
- Gallo-Roman
- Origin of the Romanians
